= National Register of Historic Places listings in Erie County, New York =

Location of Erie County in New York

This is a list of the National Register of Historic Places listings in Erie County, New York.

This is intended to be a complete list of the properties and districts on the National Register of Historic Places in Erie County, New York, United States. The locations of National Register properties and districts (at least for all showing latitude and longitude coordinates below) may be seen in a map by clicking on "Map of all coordinates".

There are 290 properties and districts listed on the National Register in the county. The city of Buffalo is the location of 205 of these properties and districts; they are listed separately, while 85 properties and districts outside Buffalo are listed here.

This National Park Service list is complete through NPS recent listings posted August 7, 2026.

Contents: Counties in New York
Albany (Albany) – Allegany – Bronx – Broome – Cattaraugus – Cayuga – Chautauqua – Chemung – Chenango – Clinton – Columbia – Cortland – Delaware – Dutchess (Poughkeepsie, Rhinebeck) – Erie (Buffalo) – Essex – Franklin – Fulton – Genesee – Greene – Hamilton – Herkimer – Jefferson – Kings – Lewis – Livingston – Madison – Monroe (Rochester) – Montgomery – Nassau – New York (Below 14th Street, 14th to 59th Streets, 59th to 110th Streets, Above 110th Street, Islands) – Niagara (Niagara Falls) – Oneida – Onondaga (Syracuse) – Ontario – Orange – Orleans – Oswego – Otsego – Putnam – Queens – Rensselaer – Richmond – Rockland – St. Lawrence – Saratoga – Schenectady – Schoharie – Schuyler – Seneca – Steuben – Suffolk – Sullivan – Tioga – Tompkins – Ulster – Warren – Washington – Wayne – Westchester (Northern, Southern, New Rochelle, Peekskill, Yonkers) – Wyoming – Yates

== Current listings ==
=== Outside Buffalo ===
	Name on the Register	Image	Date listed	Location	City or town	Description
1	Ahavas Achim Cemetery		April 29, 2025 (#100011765)	532 Pine Ridge Heritage Blvd; 42°55′35″N 78°47′27″W	Cheektowaga	
2	Alden State Bank		November 18, 2024 (#100010986)	13200 Broadway; 42°54′01″N 78°29′46″W	Alden	
3	Automobile Club of Buffalo	Automobile Club of Buffalo	June 20, 2012 (#12000341)	10405 Main Street; 42°58′47″N 78°35′56″W	Clarence	
4	Baker Memorial Methodist Episcopal Church	Baker Memorial Methodist Episcopal Church	November 28, 2012 (#12000981)	345 Main St. 42°46′05″N 78°37′20″W	East Aurora	
5	Bank of East Aurora	Bank of East Aurora	July 29, 2021 (#100006757)	649 Main St. 42°46′04″N 78°36′38″W	East Aurora	
6	The Baptist Church of Springville	The Baptist Church of Springville	December 5, 2008 (#08001140)	37 N. Buffalo St. 42°30′35″N 78°40′02″W	Springville	
7	Broadway Historic District	Broadway Historic District	February 17, 2015 (#15000005)	5423–5658 Broadway; 42°54′00″N 78°40′13″W	Lancaster	Architecture from many late 19th and early 20th centuries on this stretch of street
8	Bruce-Briggs Brick Block	Bruce-Briggs Brick Block	November 30, 1999 (#99001409)	5481-5483-5485 Broadway; 42°53′57″N 78°40′02″W	Lancaster	part of the Lancaster, New York Multiple Property Submission (MPS)
9	Buffalo Harbor South Entrance Light	Buffalo Harbor South Entrance Light	November 16, 2007 (#07001191)	Stony Pt. end of Buffalo Harbor S breakwater 42°50′00″N 78°52′03″W	Lackawanna	part of the Light Stations of the United States MPS
10	Buffalo, Rochester and Pittsburgh Railroad Station	Buffalo, Rochester and Pittsburgh Railroad Station	November 7, 1991 (#91001669)	227 W. Main St. 42°30′32″N 78°40′32″W	Springville	
11	Buffalo, Rochester and Pittsburgh Railroad Station	Buffalo, Rochester and Pittsburgh Railroad Station	August 30, 2007 (#07000871)	395 S. Lincoln Ave. 42°45′31″N 78°44′51″W	Orchard Park	
12	Chapel of Our Lady Help of Christians	Chapel of Our Lady Help of Christians	December 14, 1978 (#78001851)	4125 Union Rd. 42°55′34″N 78°45′14″W	Cheektowaga	
13	Central Avenue Historic District	Central Avenue Historic District	November 12, 2014 (#14000911)	16-50 Central Ave., 1-5 W. Main & 40 Clark Sts. 42°54′03″N 78°40′22″W	Lancaster	Historic core of village
14	Chapel Road Apartment Houses		May 4, 2026 (#100012958)	16-42 Chapel Road; 42°58′01″N 78°52′10″W	Kenmore	
15	Citizens National Bank	Citizens National Bank	April 5, 1996 (#96000295)	5 W. Main St. 42°30′32″N 78°40′04″W	Springville	
16	Clark-Lester House	Clark-Lester House	November 30, 1999 (#99001408)	5454 Broadway; 42°54′00″N 78°40′06″W	Lancaster	part of the Lancaster, New York MPS
17	Community of True Inspiration Residence	Community of True Inspiration Residence	June 25, 2013 (#13000447)	919 Mill Rd. 42°50′00″N 78°45′01″W	West Seneca	
18	Depew High School	Depew High School	August 23, 2016 (#16000593)	591 Terrace Blvd. 42°54′12″N 78°41′39″W	Depew	Early example of standardized school building, constructed in 1914 and expanded to present size in 1927. After school use ended in 2008, was sold and is being converted into senior housing.
19	DePew Lodge No. 823, Free and Accepted Masons	DePew Lodge No. 823, Free and Accepted Masons	November 30, 1999 (#99001410)	5497 Broadway; 42°53′56″N 78°40′00″W	Lancaster	part of the Lancaster, New York MPS
20	East Hill Historic District	East Hill Historic District	August 5, 2015 (#15000512)	98-367 E. Main St; 42°30′30″N 78°39′30″W	Springville	Original residential district in village
21	East Main-Mechanic Streets Historic District	East Main-Mechanic Streets Historic District	January 24, 2002 (#01001506)	Approximately at the junction of East Main and Mechanic Sts. 42°30′30″N 78°39′59″W	Springville	
22	Eaton Site		April 3, 1979 (#79001581)	Address Restricted	West Seneca	
23	Eberhardt Mansion	Eberhardt Mansion	September 8, 1983 (#83001671)	2746 Delaware Ave. 42°57′32″N 78°52′12″W	Kenmore	
24	Entranceway at Main Street at Darwin Drive	Entranceway at Main Street at Darwin Drive	July 23, 2009 (#09000554)	Main St. at Darwin Dr. 42°57′42″N 78°46′42″W	Amherst	part of the Suburban Development of Buffalo, New York MPS
25	Entranceway at Main Street at High Park Boulevard	Entranceway at Main Street at High Park Boulevard	July 23, 2009 (#09000555)	Main St. at High Park Blvd. 42°57′52″N 78°48′01″W	Amherst	part of the Suburban Development of Buffalo, New York MPS
26	Entranceway at Main Street at Lafayette Boulevard	Entranceway at Main Street at Lafayette Boulevard	July 23, 2009 (#09000556)	Main St. at Lafayette Blvd. 42°57′37″N 78°45′39″W	Amherst	part of the Suburban Development of Buffalo, New York MPS
27	Entranceway at Main Street at LeBrun Road	Entranceway at Main Street at LeBrun Road	July 23, 2009 (#09000557)	Main St. at LeBrun Rd. 42°57′52″N 78°47′52″W	Amherst	part of the Suburban Development of Buffalo, New York MPS
28	Entranceway at Main Street at Roycroft Boulevard	Entranceway at Main Street at Roycroft Boulevard	December 7, 2005 (#05001378)	Main St., junction with Roycroft Blvd. 42°57′44″N 78°46′48″W	Amherst	part of the Suburban Development of Buffalo, New York MPS
29	Entranceway at Main Street at Westfield Road and Ivyhurst Road	Entranceway at Main Street at Westfield Road and Ivyhurst Road	July 23, 2009 (#09000558)	Main St. at Westfield Rd. and Ivyhurst Rd. 42°57′51″N 78°48′06″W	Amherst	part of the Suburban Development of Buffalo, New York MPS
30	Entranceways at Main Street at Lamarck Drive and Smallwood Drive	Entranceways at Main Street at Lamarck Drive and Smallwood Drive	December 7, 2005 (#05001379)	Main St. at Lamarck Dr. and Smallwood Dr. 42°57′45″N 78°46′27″W	Amherst	part of the Suburban Development of Buffalo, New York MPS
31	J. Eshelman and Company Store	J. Eshelman and Company Store	May 6, 1982 (#82003356)	6000 Goodrich Rd. 43°00′38″N 78°38′15″W	Clarence Center	
32	Fiddlers Green Historic District	Fiddlers Green Historic District	September 14, 2018 (#100002922)	65-85 Franklin & 23-37 N Buffalo Sts. 42°30′32″N 78°40′17″W	Springville	Core of present-day village, where buildings date to earliest settlement in 1818
33	Millard Fillmore House	Millard Fillmore House	May 30, 1974 (#74001235)	24 Shearer Ave. 42°46′06″N 78°37′21″W	East Aurora	
34	First Church of Evans Complex	First Church of Evans Complex	April 12, 2006 (#06000257)	7431 Erie Rd. 42°41′00″N 79°00′48″W	Derby	
35	Gamel Hexadecagon Barn	Gamel Hexadecagon Barn	September 29, 1984 (#84002386)	Shirley Rd. 42°34′39″N 78°55′39″W	North Collins	part of the Central Plan Dairy Barns of New York Thematic Resource (TR)
36	Garrison Cemetery	Garrison Cemetery	October 10, 2002 (#02001113)	Aero Dr. 42°56′49″N 78°43′50″W	Cheektowaga	
37	Graycliff	Graycliff	October 1, 1998 (#98001222)	6472-6482 Lakeshore Rd. 42°42′44″N 78°58′20″W	Derby	Designed by Frank Lloyd Wright as the summer estate for Isabelle and Darwin Martin (1926-31,) Graycliff is also a New York State Landmark
38	Hamburg Downtown Historic District	Hamburg Downtown Historic District	December 4, 2012 (#12000997)	11–235 Main Street; 42°42′58″N 78°50′04″W	Hamburg	Intact downtown core of suburban village
39	Warren Hull House	Warren Hull House	May 11, 1992 (#92000456)	5976 Genesee St. 42°56′44″N 78°37′23″W	Lancaster	
40	Burton H. Hurd House		April 16, 2026 (#100012709)	2740 Bowen Rd; 42°50′43″N 78°38′26″W	Elma	
41	Johnson-Jolls Complex	Johnson-Jolls Complex	May 6, 1980 (#80002611)	S-4287 S. Buffalo St. 42°45′28″N 78°44′39″W	Orchard Park	
42	Kibler High School	Kibler High School	January 15, 1999 (#98001612)	284 Main St. 43°00′42″N 78°52′53″W	Tonawanda	
43	Kleis Site	Kleis Site	April 20, 1979 (#79001580)	Address Restricted	Hamburg	
44	Lancaster District School No. 6	Lancaster District School No. 6	November 18, 2008 (#08001076)	3703 Bowen Rd. 42°52′53″N 78°38′24″W	Lancaster	
45	Lancaster Municipal Building	Lancaster Municipal Building	November 30, 1999 (#99001420)	5423 Broadway; 42°54′00″N 78°40′14″W	Lancaster	part of the Lancaster, New York MPS
46	Liebler-Rohl Gasoline Station	Liebler-Rohl Gasoline Station	November 30, 1999 (#99001411)	5500 Broadway; 42°53′58″N 78°39′59″W	Lancaster	part of the Lancaster, New York MPS
47	Lustron House Westchester Deluxe Model M02 #01310		August 16, 2023 (#100008880)	3381 North Boston Rd. 42°40′42″N 78°51′50″W	Eden	
48	Miller-Mackey House	Miller-Mackey House	November 30, 1999 (#99001422)	5440 Broadway; 42°54′01″N 78°52′12″W	Lancaster	part of the Lancaster, New York MPS
49	Newton–Hopper Village Site		April 3, 2012 (#12000176)	Address Restricted	Elma	
50	New York State Barge Canal	New York State Barge Canal	October 15, 2014 (#14000860)	Linear across county 43°01′13″N 78°52′30″W	Amherst, Tonawanda	Successor to Erie Canal approved by state voters in early 20th century to compete with railroads.
51	Dr. John J. Nowak House	Dr. John J. Nowak House	November 30, 1999 (#99001414)	5539 Broadway; 42°53′51″N 78°39′49″W	Lancaster	part of the Lancaster, New York MPS
52	Old Sardinia Town Hall	Old Sardinia Town Hall	December 23, 2008 (#08001231)	12070 Savage Road; 42°32′58″N 78°30′29″W	Sardinia	
53	Our Lady of Victory National Shrine and Basilica Historic District	Our Lady of Victory National Shrine and Basilica Historic District	February 26, 2024 (#100009962)	777 Ridge Road and 781 Ridge Road; 42°49′33″N 78°49′25″W	Lackawanna	
54	Our Mother of Good Counsel Roman Catholic Church Complex	Our Mother of Good Counsel Roman Catholic Church Complex	December 21, 2020 (#100005914)	3688 South Park Ave. and 15 Oakwood Ave. 42°47′55″N 78°49′25″W	Blasdell	
55	Pioneer Cemetery	Pioneer Cemetery	January 4, 2012 (#11000997)	West side of N. Main St. between Gold St. & Beach Rd. 42°39′11″N 79°02′07″W	Evans Center	
56	Former Reformed Mennonite Church	Former Reformed Mennonite Church	July 3, 2003 (#03000596)	5178 Main St. 42°57′39″N 78°45′35″W	Amherst	
57	Rich-Twinn Octagon House	Rich-Twinn Octagon House	February 10, 1995 (#95000050)	145 Main St. 43°01′19″N 78°29′44″W	Akron	
58	John Richardson House	John Richardson House	November 30, 1999 (#99001419)	5653 Broadway; 42°53′48″N 78°39′29″W	Lancaster	part of the Lancaster, New York MPS
59	Rider-Hopkins Farm and Olmsted Camp	Rider-Hopkins Farm and Olmsted Camp	January 15, 1999 (#98001613)	12820 Benton Rd. 42°31′52″N 78°30′43″W	Sardinia	
60	Roycroft Campus	Roycroft Campus	November 8, 1974 (#74001236)	Main and W. Grove Sts. 42°46′01″N 78°37′09″W	East Aurora	
61	St. Paul's Roman Catholic Church Complex	St. Paul's Roman Catholic Church Complex	July 11, 2022 (#100007890)	2930 Delaware Ave, 45 Victoria Blvd. 42°57′49″N 78°52′13″W	Kenmore	
62	George and Gladys Scheidemantel House	George and Gladys Scheidemantel House	August 5, 1993 (#93000778)	363 Oakwood Ave. 42°45′56″N 78°37′18″W	East Aurora	
63	Scobey Power Plant and Dam	Scobey Power Plant and Dam	September 20, 1996 (#96000296)	Junction of Scobey Hill Rd. and Cattaraugus Cr. 42°28′42″N 78°41′56″W	Springville	
64	John P. Sommers House	John P. Sommers House	January 4, 2012 (#11000998)	33 Lake Ave. 42°53′54″N 78°40′06″W	Lancaster	part of the Lancaster, New York MPS
65	Spaulding-Sidway Boathouse	Spaulding-Sidway Boathouse	May 20, 1998 (#98000552)	2296 W. Oakfield Rd. 42°58′16″N 78°58′38″W	Grand Island	
66	St. Mary of the Angels Motherhouse Complex	St. Mary of the Angels Motherhouse Complex	October 24, 2002 (#02001046)	400 Mill St. 42°58′19″N 78°44′52″W	Amherst	
67	St. Matthias Episcopal Church Complex	St. Matthias Episcopal Church Complex	December 3, 2019 (#100004735)	374 Main St., 24 Maple St. 42°46′06″N 78°37′15″W	East Aurora	1928 English Gothc Revival church based on rural English parish churches
68	Thomas Indian School	Thomas Indian School	January 25, 1973 (#73001188)	NY 438 on Cattaraugus Reservation; 42°32′22″N 78°59′48″W	Irving	
69	Tonawanda (25th Separate Company) Armory	Tonawanda (25th Separate Company) Armory	January 28, 1994 (#93001539)	79 Delaware Ave. 43°02′39″N 78°52′22″W	Tonawanda	Castellated armory building constructed in 1896; part of the Army National Guard Armories in New York State MPS
70	Tonawanda Municipal Building	Tonawanda Municipal Building	June 12, 2013 (#13000370)	2919 Delaware Ave. 42°57′49″N 78°52′11″W	Kenmore	Art Deco municipal building constructed in 1930s.
71	US Post Office-Akron	US Post Office-Akron	November 17, 1988 (#88002449)	118 Main St. 43°01′13″N 78°29′53″W	Akron	part of the US Post Offices in New York State, 1858-1943, TR
72	US Post Office-Angola	US Post Office-Angola	November 17, 1988 (#88002452)	80 N. Main St. 42°38′23″N 79°01′42″W	Angola	part of the US Post Offices in New York State, 1858-1943, TR
73	US Post Office-Depew	US Post Office-Depew	November 17, 1988 (#88002481)	165 Warsaw St. 42°54′14″N 78°41′25″W	Depew	part of the US Post Offices in New York State, 1858-1943, TR
74	US Post Office-Lancaster	US Post Office-Lancaster	May 11, 1989 (#88002340)	5406 Broadway St. 42°54′01″N 78°40′17″W	Lancaster	part of the US Post Offices in New York State, 1858-1943, TR
75	US Post Office-Springville	US Post Office-Springville	May 11, 1989 (#88002433)	75 Franklin St. 42°30′34″N 78°39′58″W	Springville	part of the US Post Offices in New York State, 1858-1943, TR
76	US Post Office-Tonawanda	US Post Office-Tonawanda	May 11, 1989 (#88002437)	96 Seymour St. 43°01′01″N 78°52′47″W	Tonawanda	part of the US Post Offices in New York State, 1858-1943, TR
77	Herman B. VanPeyma House	Herman B. VanPeyma House	November 30, 1999 (#99001417)	5565 Broadway; 42°53′51″N 78°39′42″W	Lancaster	part of the Lancaster, New York MPS
78	Villa Maria Motherhouse Complex	Villa Maria Motherhouse Complex	July 14, 2006 (#06000571)	600 Doat St. 42°54′37″N 78°47′55″W	Cheektowaga	
79	West End Historic District	West End Historic District	March 12, 2018 (#SG100002187)	90-171 W Main, 17 Park & 186-244 Franklin Sts. & 24-110 N Central Ave. 42°30′32″N 78°40′17″W	Springville	Intact enclave of religious buildings and houses at west side of village developed in late 19th and early 20th centuries following 1878 Springville and Sardinia Railroad completion
80	Williamsville Christian Church	Williamsville Christian Church	May 22, 2002 (#02000546)	5658 Main St. 42°57′48″N 78°44′33″W	Williamsville	
81	Williamsville Junior and Senior High School	Williamsville Junior and Senior High School	May 12, 2008 (#08000407)	5950 Main St. 42°57′53″N 78°43′59″W	Williamsville	
82	Williamsville Water Mill Complex	Williamsville Water Mill Complex	September 22, 1983 (#83001675)	56 and 60 Spring St. 42°57′48″N 78°43′56″W	Williamsville	
83	Wood and Brooks Company Factory Complex	Wood and Brooks Company Factory Complex	July 28, 2023 (#100009162)	2101 Kenmore Ave. 42°57′48″N 78°53′40″W	Tonawanda	
84	Yeomans House	Yeomans House	December 2, 2024 (#100011077)	866 East Main Street; 42°46′04″N 78°36′10″W	East Aurora	
85	Zuidema-Idsardi House	Zuidema-Idsardi House	November 30, 1999 (#99001416)	5556 Broadway; 42°53′54″N 78°39′45″W	Lancaster	part of the Lancaster, New York MPS

== See also ==
- National Register of Historic Places listings in New York
