= Lancaster, New York =

- Town
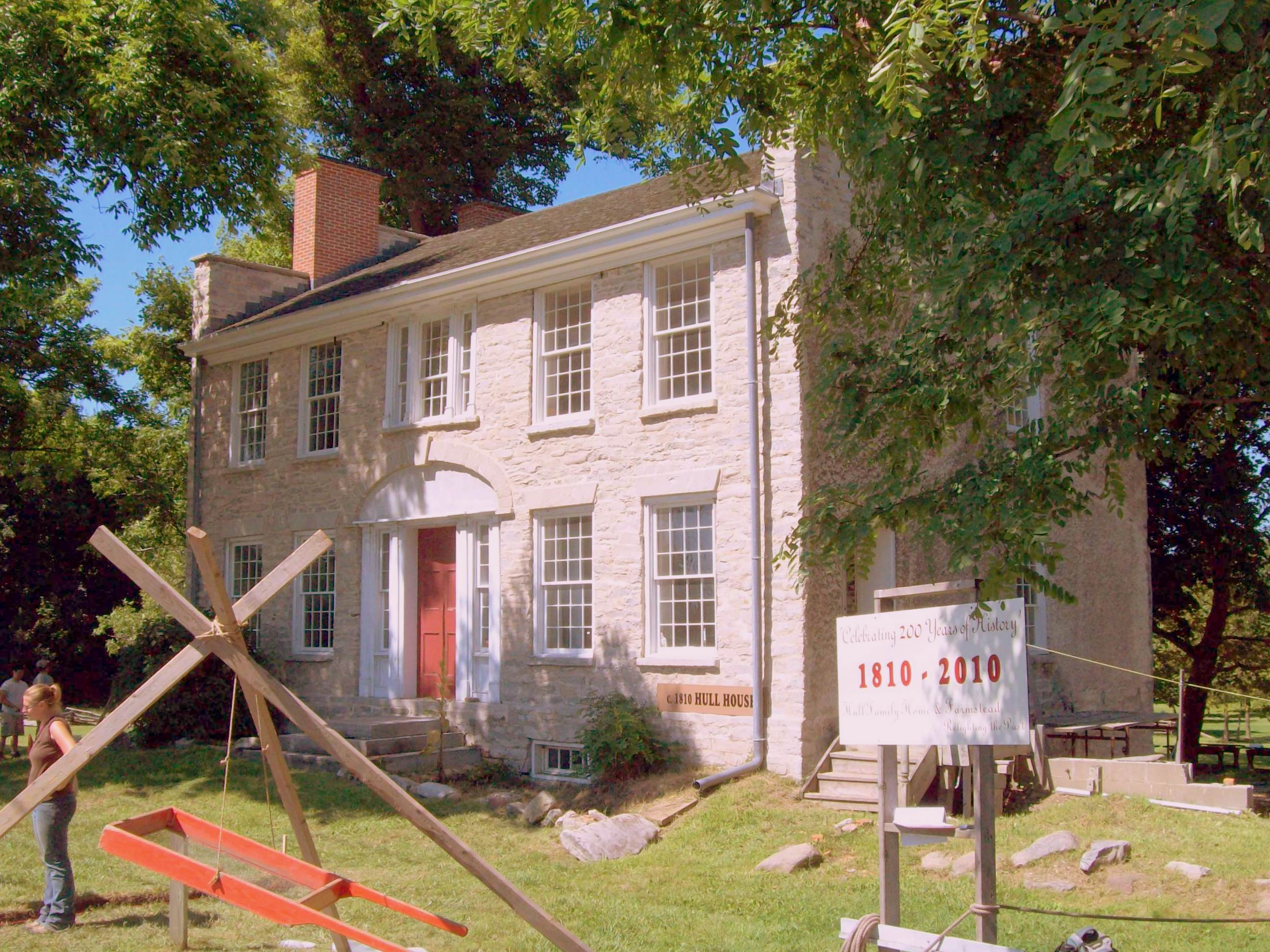
- The Warren Hull House, at the intersection of Genesee Street and Pavement Road in Lancaster. It is Erie County's oldest surviving stone structure, built in 1810.

- Seal

- Location in Erie County and the state of New York.

- Location of New York in the United States
- Coordinates: 42°54′22″N 78°38′02″W
- Country: United States
- State: New York
- County: Erie County
- Incorporated: 1833
- Named after: Lancaster, Massachusetts

Government
  - Town Supervisor: Robert E. Leary (R)
  - Town Council: Councilmembers: Adam L. Dickman (R); Dawn C. Schroeder (C); Mark R. Burkard (R); Melissa A. Studley (R)

Area
  - Total: 37.94 sq mi (98.27 km^{2})
  - Land: 37.71 sq mi (97.66 km^{2})
  - Water: 0.24 sq mi (0.61 km^{2})
- Elevation: 712 ft (217 m)

Population (2020)
  - Total: 45,106 ▲
  - Density: 1,145/sq mi (441.9/km^{2})
- Time zone: UTC-5 (EST)
  - Summer (DST): UTC-4 (EDT)
- ZIP Codes: 14086 (Lancaster); 14043 (Depew); 14026 (Bowmansville); 14004 (Alden); 14059 (Elma); 14221 (Williamsville)
- Area codes: 716, 624
- FIPS code: 36-029-41146
- FIPS code: 36-41146
- GNIS feature ID: 0955014
- Website: lancasterny.gov

Lancaster is a town in Erie County, New York, United States, centered 14 miles (23 km) east of downtown Buffalo. Lancaster is an outer ring suburb of Buffalo. As of the 2020 Census, the town population was 45,106. Located within the town is the village of Lancaster and the eastern half of the village of Depew. Depew's western half lies within the town of Cheektowaga.

== History ==
In 1803, the Holland Land Company sold its first plot of land in the future town. The town of Lancaster was formed from the town of Clarence in 1833. The town was named after Lancaster, Massachusetts, but the reason for applying this name is not known. Originally called "Cayuga Creek", the town later incorporated and obtained the current name.

Lancaster has the oldest stone structure in Erie County, the Warren Hull House. It was listed on the National Register of Historic Places in 1992. Also within the town is the Gipple Cabin, the oldest wooden structure in Erie County. The cabin is on private land just south of the northern town line. The cabin was dismantled in the fall of 2013 and relocated to the Hull House property for preservation. The Lancaster Bee News stated it was stored in a barn on the original property and not taken for restoration. The Lancaster District School No. 6 was listed on the National Register of Historic Places in 2008. In 1857, the town's southern half was taken to form the town of Elma.

In the late 1960s, Buffalo developer Edward H. Cottrell proposed what would have been the world's second domed stadium in Lancaster. The Dome Stadium Incorporated was formed but the County refused to participate and resulted in a 20-year breach of contract litigation and eventually lead a dismissal in 1986. Lancaster has, in recent years, evolved into a suburban community, due to the white flight from Buffalo. In the early 1990s, the town entered a period of rapid growth, with much development in the southern and eastern parts of the town. The William Street Intermediate School opened in the southern part of town in the mid-1990s, and in 2003, the town and village police departments merged. Additions to the middle school and the William Street School to accommodate rising enrollment were finished in 2005.

Lancaster High School is Erie County's largest school in both student population and square footage. With over 2,000 students, the building was expanded twice. First in 1970 and in 2000, a field house was added. In 2003, the high school opened up a new wing to house natural sciences classrooms.

Some of the town's biggest events are held in the village of Lancaster. They are the Fourth of July Parade and the Taste of Lancaster, a restaurant festival and charity fundraiser. The Lancaster/Depew high school football game is held in October. The game dates back to 1919.

Lancaster once had its own professional football team in the 1910s. The Lancaster Malleables played in the New York Pro Football League and won the league championship in 1913 and 1914.

== Geography ==
According to the United States Census Bureau, the town has a total area of 37.93 square miles (98.25 km^{2}), of which 37.70 square miles (97.65 km^{2}) is land and 0.24 square miles (0.61 km^{2}), or 0.62%, is water. The town is located on the northern and eastern side of Erie County. The center of Lancaster is 14 miles (23 km) east of downtown Buffalo.

Much of Lancaster is highly suburbanized, but the eastern section of the town, notably the area east of County Route 242 (Bowen Road), is only starting to undergo development, retaining a somewhat-rural character.

The western town line is marked by NY 78 and, south of NY 130, US 20. The New York State Thruway (Interstate 90) crosses the northern part of the town. NY 33 crosses the town immediately south of the Thruway, and US 20 crosses the central part of the town.

=== Adjacent towns and areas ===
The town of Clarence is to the north, and the town of Elma is to the south. The town of Alden is to the east, and the town of Cheektowaga is to the west.

== Demographics ==
Historical population
Census	Pop.	Note	%±
1840	2,083		—
1850	3,794		82.1%
1860	4,659		22.8%
1870	4,336		−6.9%
1880	3,944		−9.0%
1890	3,962		0.5%
1900	8,757		121.0%
1910	9,663		10.3%
1920	13,172		36.3%
1930	15,260		15.9%
1940	15,299		0.3%
1950	18,471		20.7%
1960	25,605		38.6%
1970	30,634		19.6%
1980	30,144		−1.6%
1990	32,181		6.8%
2000	39,019		21.2%
2010	41,604		6.6%
2020	45,106		8.4%
U.S. Decennial Census

As of the census of 2000, there were 39,019 people, 15,053 households, and 10,506 families residing in the town. The population density was 1,031.1 inhabitants per square mile (398.1/km^{2}). There were 15,627 housing units at an average density of 413.0 per square mile (159.5/km^{2}). The racial makeup of the town was 98.00% White, 0.81% Black or African American, 0.18% Native American, 0.39% Asian, 0.01% Pacific Islander, 0.12% from other races, and 0.50% from two or more races. Hispanic or Latino of any race were 0.67% of the population.

There were 15,053 households, out of which 33.1% had children under the age of 18 living with them, 58.3% were married couples living together, 8.5% had a female householder with no husband present, and 30.2% were non-families. 26.0% of all households were made up of individuals, and 11.0% had someone living alone who was 65 years of age or older. The average household size was 2.55 and the average family size was 3.11.

In the town, the population was spread out, with 25.1% under the age of 18, 6.5% from 18 to 24, 31.3% from 25 to 44, 22.8% from 45 to 64, and 14.3% who were 65 years of age or older. The median age was 38 years. For every 100 females, there were 93.8 males. For every 100 females age 18 and over, there were 90.1 males.

The median income for a household in the town was $48,990, and the median income for a family was $59,712. Males had a median income of $41,501 versus $28,049 for females. The per capita income for the town was $21,723. About 2.5% of families and 3.9% of the population were below the poverty line, including 3.6% of those under age 18 and 5.7% of those age 65 or over.

== Locations ==
The town's most populated areas include the village of Lancaster, half the village of Depew, and the two largest hamlets, Town Line and Bowmansville. The town also contains other smaller communities and hamlets.

- Bowmansville – A large hamlet in the northwestern corner of the town, located near Genesee Street (NY 33) between Harris Hill Road and Transit Road (NY 78). Ellicott Creek flows through the hamlet. The hamlet took its name from early settler Benjamin Bowman. The West Shore Railroad once passed through the hamlet and had a station on Maple Drive.
- Town Line – A large hamlet at the intersection of Town Line Road and Broadway (US 20) on Lancaster's eastern town line. Notably, the hamlet seceded from the United States of America to join the Confederate States of America during the Civil War, officially voting to rejoin the Union in 1945.
- Town Line Station – A location on Town Line Road, Lancaster's eastern town line; north of the hamlet of Town Line. Located at the Norfolk Southern (formerly Erie Railroad) crossing at Town Line Road.
- Dellwood – A location at the eastern town line on Town Line Road, where the former Delaware, Lackawanna, and Western Railroad crossed the highway. The abandoned railroad bed contains the Lancaster Heritage Trail, a bike path ending at Town Line Road.
- East Lancaster – A location east of Lancaster village and west of the hamlet of Town Line; located on Broadway (US 20) between Bowen Road and Pavement Road.
- Looneyville – A location at the intersection of Townline Road and Walden Avenue, north of Dellwood.
- Wilhelm – A location at the intersection of Genesee Street (NY 33) and Gunnville Road, east of Bowmansville.

Streams and waterways:

- Cayuga Creek – A stream flowing westward through the town and village; flowing through Como Lake Park.
- Ellicott Creek – A stream flowing westward through the northern part of the town, including the hamlet of Bowmansville.
- Little Buffalo Creek – a small creek branching from Cayuga Creek immediately east of the Bowen Road bridge.
- Scajaquada Creek – A small stream that rises in the northern part of the town and flows west into Cheektowaga.
- Plumb Bottom Creek – A small stream flowing from the town of Lancaster into the village of Lancaster, finally ending up at Cayuga Creek.
- Slate Bottom Creek – A small stream flowing through the southern part of the town.

== Parks and recreation ==
The town and village of Lancaster contain the following parks:

- Walden Pond Park, located on the corner of Walden Avenue and Ransom Road in the town. Contains baseball diamonds, volleyball courts, playgrounds, and a pond for fishing. The Lancaster-Depew Ponytails Softball League call this park their home.
- Westwood Park, located between Pavement Road and Schwartz Road in the town. Contains playgrounds, baseball, softball, and soccer fields.
- Como Lake Park, an Erie County park located in the town and village of Lancaster. Contains playgrounds, fields, basketball courts, tennis/pickleball courts, trails, sledding hills, woods, bike paths, and shelters. Cayuga Creek flows through the park. Entrances in the town include the William Street entrance and the Bowen Road entrance. Entrances in the village include a walkway entrance off Pardee Avenue and one on Como Park Boulevard, adjacent from Quincey Avenue.
- Veteran's Park, which features several military monuments and memorials, is located just outside of Como Lake Park between Lake Avenue, Old Lake Avenue, and Pardee Avenue.
- Meadow Lea Park is located between Iroquois Avenue and Broezel Avenue in the town. The park includes a pool, a baseball field, and a playground.
- The Bowmansville Fire Hall is home to a Town Parks and Recreation-maintained softball field. The picnic shelter is a host for the summer recreation program.
- Keysa Park is a village park located on Vandenburg Avenue that includes a pool, a playground, tennis courts, a football field, and a baseball field.
- Mechanic Street Park is a small village park on Mechanic Street. This park includes a playground, and tennis courts.
- The Lancaster Heritage Trail is a bike trail located on the former D, L,& W railroad bed. The path runs for about 4 miles (6 km) from the village line at Walter Winter Road to the town line at Townline Road. The bike path passes by the Lancaster Swamps and Willow Beach (now known as Lorall Lake).
- Lorall Lake, or more widely known to Lancastrians as Willow Beach, is a former lake-beach known for its depth and clear water. The lake is located on Nichter Road in the town between Pavement Road and Cemetery Road.
- Lancaster National Speedway & Dragway is a 1/8th mile drag racing strip and oval track for other race cars. They host all sorts of events from test and tune drag racing and car shows to full on circuit racing

== Historic buildings ==
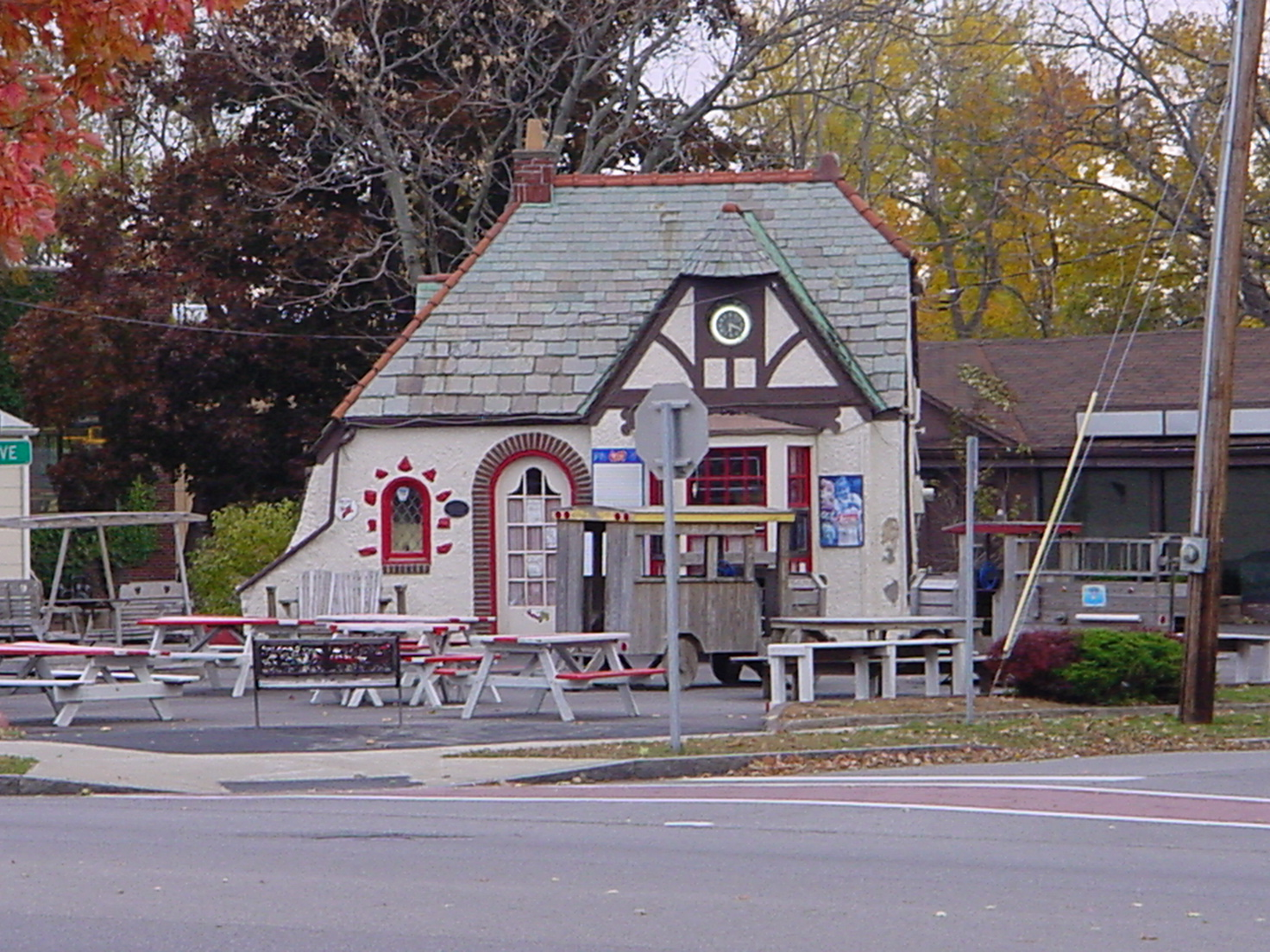
The former Liebler-Rohl Gasoline Station is on the National Register of Historic Places.

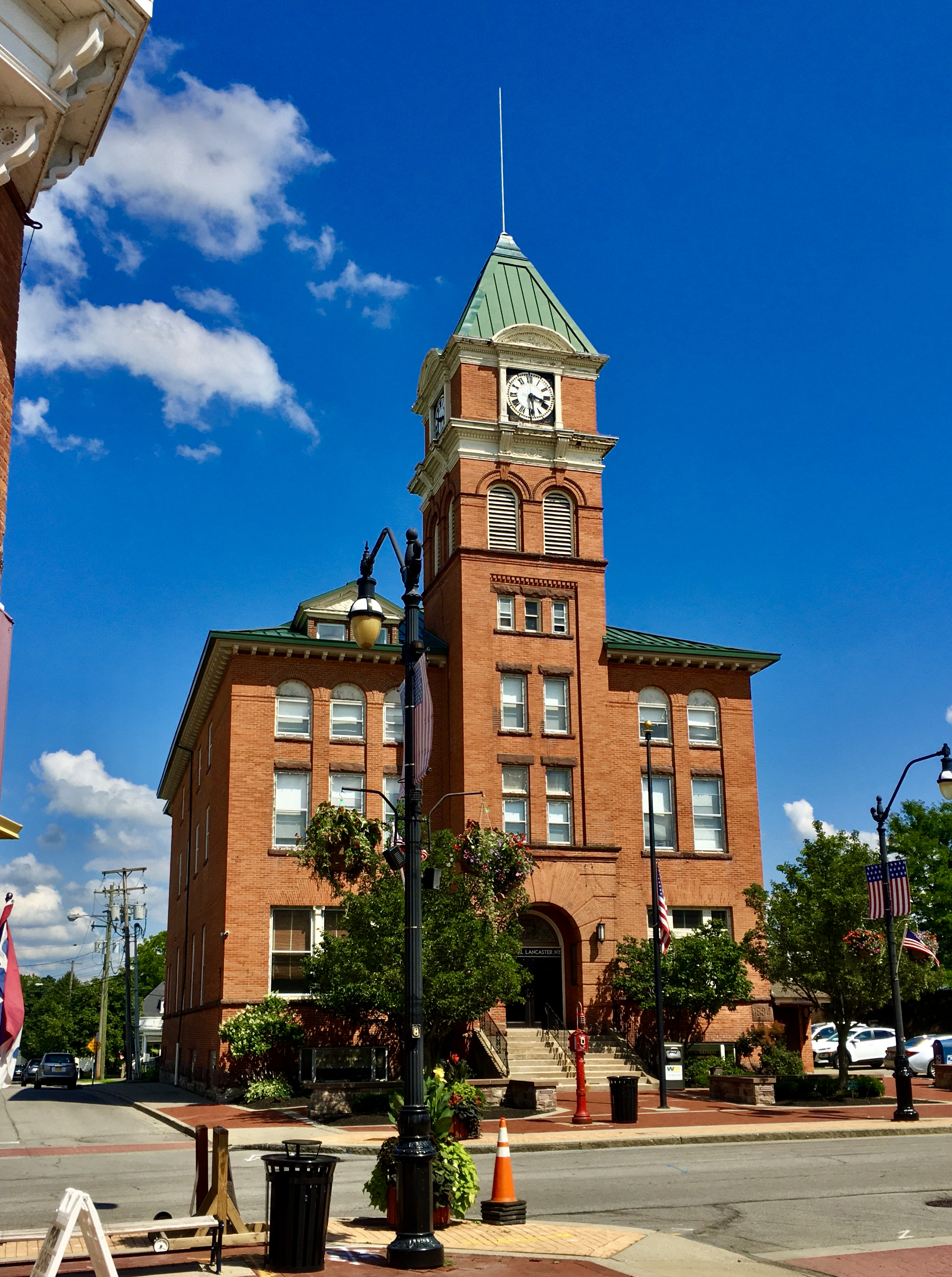
Lancaster Town Hall

The town of Lancaster contains several historic buildings, listed on the National Register of Historic Places. The buildings include the Warren Hull House, the Lancaster District School No. 6, and many of the Village of Lancaster's Multiple Property Submission properties, including the Bruce-Briggs Brick Block, Clark-Lester House, DePew Lodge No. 823, Free and Accepted Masons, US Post Office-Lancaster, Lancaster Municipal Building, Liebler-Rohl Gasoline Station, Miller-Mackey House, Dr. John J. Nowak House, Herman B. VanPeyma House, John Richardson House, Zuidema-Idsardi House and the John P. Sommers House. The twelve latter properties are located within the Village of Lancaster.

The US Post Office-Depew, which is located on the town of Lancaster's side of the village of Depew, is technically in the town of Lancaster, so it is included on the list of historic sites.

A domed football stadium was planned to be built in Lancaster. A plan from January 30, 1970, called for the domed stadium on Pleasant View Drive that would allow for football and baseball games. It would have been modeled after the Houston Astrodome. The Erie County Legislature scrapped the plan a week after Buffalo Bills owner Ralph Wilson, Jr. demanded a definitive stadium plan within 60 days. After scrapping the plan, legislators passed a resolution to seek an alternative project immediately. The domed stadium was first proposed in 1967 but its implementation was blocked over disputes about the location.

In 2001, VFW Post 7275 was named in honor of Medal of Honor recipient Lt. Col. Matt Urban.

== Education ==
The Lancaster Central School District includes the majority of the town. Other parts of the town are in Alden Central School District, Clarence Central School District, Depew Union Free School District, and Iroquois Central School District

The town is home to Lancaster High School and five operating elementary schools; Como Park, Court Street, Hillview, John A. Sciole (which is actually located on the Cheektowaga side of the village of Depew), and the former Central Avenue Elementary School. It also includes the William Street Intermediate School (4th, 5th and 6th grades), and the historic Lancaster Middle School (formerly named Aurora Middle School), which was the town's high school prior to the construction of the current one in 1953. They are all part of the Lancaster Central School District.

There are a number of private schools (with the Catholic schools being affiliated with the Roman Catholic Diocese of Buffalo), including St. Mary's High School, Chesterton Academy of Buffalo, St. Mary's on the Hill Elementary, and the now closed Our Lady of Pompeii Elementary. Our Lady of Pompeii closed in 2014. In January 2014 it had 14 employees and 70 students.

The Lancaster District is the largest school district in population in Erie County with one high school. The district serves most of the town and village, including a large majority of the northern part of the village of Depew, on both the Lancaster and Cheektowaga sides. The Depew Union Free School District serves most of the southern part of the village of Depew and almost none of the town or village of Lancaster.

== Fire, police and emergency medical services ==
The town of Lancaster is served by four volunteer fire companies. The fire companies are the Bowmansville Volunteer Fire Association, Town Line Fire Department, Twin District Fire Company, and Millgrove Volunteer Fire Department. Bowmansville and Town Line each have two fire stations, while Twin District and Millgrove each operate out of one. Two of the fire companies are located within their respective hamlets, Bowmansville and Town Line. All four town companies respond to all alarms of fire along with requests for EMS.

The Millgrove Fire Company is actually not located in the town of Lancaster. Millgrove is a hamlet in the town of Alden, but because the small hamlet of Millgrove is so close to the northeastern portion of Lancaster, the fire company serves a very small portion of the town.

The Lancaster Village Fire Department serves the village of Lancaster with two stations. The main station is located in the Lancaster Municipal Building, and the Northside Station Two is on West Drullard Avenue. The LFD does not respond to EMS calls, except when requested for calls such as MVAs or lift assists.

The Lancaster Police Department serves the town and village of Lancaster. Prior to the 21st century, the town and village had separate police departments. It was the first major consolidation of law enforcement in Western New York. The LPD operates with roughly 51 officers, which includes road patrol, bike team, 3 school resource officers, detective bureau, and the police tactical team, the ERT (Emergency Response Team). The Lancaster Police Department operates out of the Lancaster Town Center, located at 525 Pavement Road. It was the site of a former United States Army Nike base, where the police still operate out of the former administration building. A new police and courts center was built on the Pavement Road site and officially opened February 5, 2014. The current Chief of Police is William J. Karn, Jr.

The Lancaster Volunteer Ambulance Corps responds to all requests for EMS in Lancaster village and town, along with the village of Depew. It is located at 40 Embry Place within the village limits. Lancaster Ambulance operates with a fleet of seven ambulances and one fly car. It is a combination staffed EMS agency, which has career EMTs, AEMTs, and paramedics on duty 24/7/365. The average yearly call volume is over 4,000 calls and increasing.

== Notable people ==
- Nathaniel L. Carpenter, prominent businessman in Natchez, Mississippi
- Ruth Carroll, children's book illustrator
- George Allen Davis, former New York State Senator
- Iron Davis, former MLB pitcher
- Pat Dobson, professional MLB baseball pitcher, 20 game-winner with the Baltimore Orioles
- Mike Janis, drag racer
- Olive P. Lester, notable academic and women's advocate
- Jason Mangone, head football coach at The College at Brockport, State University of New York
- Adam Page, Paralympic gold medalist
- Kristen Romano, swimmer
- Kevin Rosier, former kickboxer, lived in Lancaster
- Mary Saxer, track and field athlete
- Hank A. Smith, former NFL player
- Kevin Sylvester, former announcer for the Buffalo Sabres, currently is an announcer for the PGA Tour
- Charles F. Tabor, former New York State Attorney General
- Dorothy Thompson, journalist, born in Lancaster
- Ryan Vinz, video technician who was on the Buffalo Sabres active roster for one game
- Julius Volker, former New York State Assemblyman
- Monica P. Wallace, New York State Assemblywoman
- Eric Wedge, head baseball coach at Wichita State University

== Major highways ==
- Interstate 90 (New York State Thruway) runs east-west through the town, traveling from the Cheektowaga town line in the west to the Clarence town line in the north. There is an exit to Transit Road (New York State Route 78) in Cheektowaga that also serves Lancaster.
- U.S. Route 20 (Transit Road, Broadway), north-south roadway that runs concurrently with NY 78 along Lancaster's west border with Cheektowaga, south of Depew. Route 20 then turns east onto Broadway. Route 20 is known as Broadway in the town and village of Lancaster.
- New York State Route 78 (Transit Road), north-south roadway that provides the east border of Cheektowaga with Lancaster, north and south of Depew.
- New York State Route 33 (Genesee Street), east-west route that runs from Transit Road New York State Route 78 to Townline Road, where it enters the town of Alden.
- New York State Route 952Q (Walden Avenue), east-west highway through the village and town of Lancaster. Walden Avenue is the longest non-parkway New York State Reference Route. Walden's reference route number is not signed, but still has reference markers, and is maintained by the New York State Department of Transportation (NYSDOT) as other signed routes are. Walden Avenue parallels the New York Central Railroad as it goes throughout the town and village.

== Airport ==
Lancaster is home to Buffalo-Lancaster Regional Airport, which is located on Walden Avenue on the east side of the town.

== Media ==
NEWSPAPERS

- Lancaster Bee
- Buffalo News

RADIO STATIONS

- WXRL
