= Lancaster (village), New York =

Lancaster, New York
- Village
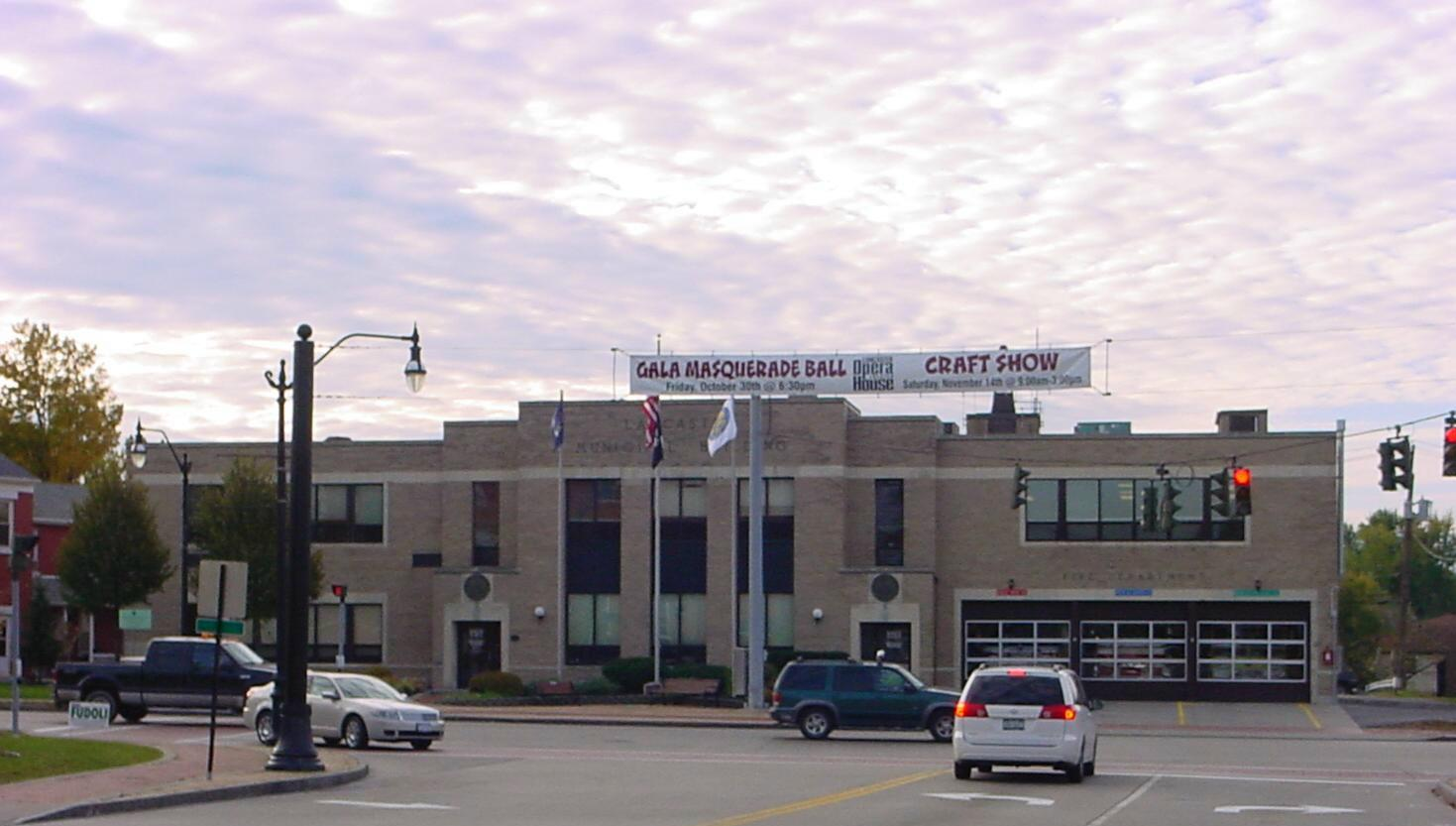
- Lancaster Village Municipal Building

- Location in Erie County and the state of New York
- Coordinates: 42°54′1″N 78°40′23″W
- Country: United States
- State: New York
- County: Erie
- Town: Lancaster
- Incorporated: 1849
- Named for: Lancaster, New York

Government
  - Mayor: William Schroeder
  - Trustees: Tammie Malone-Schaffer (Deputy Mayor); John Mikoley; Gavin O’Brien; Dee Miller

Area
  - Total: 2.75 sq mi (7.13 km^{2})
  - Land: 2.72 sq mi (7.04 km^{2})
  - Water: 0.035 sq mi (0.09 km^{2})
- Elevation: 673 ft (205 m)

Population (2020)
  - Total: 10,027
  - Density: 3,688.8/sq mi (1,424.27/km^{2})
- Time zone: UTC-5 (Eastern (EST))
  - Summer (DST): UTC-4 (EDT)
- ZIP codes: 14086 (Lancaster); 14043 (Depew)
- Area code: 716
- FIPS code: 36-41135
- Website: lancastervillageny.gov

Lancaster is a village in Erie County, New York, United States. As of the 2010 census, the village population was 10,027. It is part of the Buffalo-Niagara Falls metropolitan area.

The village of Lancaster is in the west part of the town of Lancaster and is east of Buffalo.

The Lancaster Opera House is locally famous for its musicals and stage plays. The current mayor is William Schroeder.

== History ==
The Village of Lancaster was incorporated in 1849 from part of the town of Lancaster. Lancaster is the third oldest incorporated village in Erie County, behind Springville and Gowanda. The village is proud of its historic past and emphasizes preservation of its historic buildings. Lancaster was formerly known as "Cayuga Creek." Lancaster is one of approximately 30 communities in New York with historic districts.

The oldest house in the village is the Carpenter–Draper House, built in 1831. The Lancaster Presbyterian Church is the second oldest religious structure in Erie County, built in 1832.

Churches in the village include Lancaster Presbyterian Church, St. John's Lutheran, Trinity Episcopal, and Faith United Methodist. Catholic churches include St. Mary of the Assumption and Our Lady of Pompeii.

The Lancaster Opera House, the visual center of the village, was built in 1897. This building is still the main focus of the downtown Lancaster area because of its massive size and its clock tower. At the time it was built, the name "Opera House" indicated it was a multi-use building, a tradition that continues today as the building also houses the Lancaster Town offices. People in the community commonly call it either "the Opera House" or "the Town Hall."

The Central Avenue/Broadway area is the downtown business area in the village. West Main Street was revitalized and is now home to several restaurants, bars, shops, and services.

Four railroads (Erie RR, Lehigh Valley RR, Delaware, Lackawanna and Western RR, and New York Central RR) once traversed the village, but only two remain. The fifth railroad in the town of Lancaster, the West Shore RR, did not go through the village, but did have a station in Bowmansville, a hamlet in the northwestern part of the town. Each railroad had a station on Central Ave.

A trolley once went through the village, down Como Park Boulevard from Buffalo, to Lake Avenue, to Church Street, to East Main Street (now Broadway), to Central Avenue, and then finally to Sawyer Avenue. The trolley then continued into the connecting village of Depew, where Sawyer Avenue turned into Main Street.

Several fires have caused damage over the years to the downtown area. The Great Fire of 1894 destroyed much of the west side of Central Avenue and the Grimes-Davis Mansion, which stood at the corner of Broadway and Central Avenue. A gas station now occupies the site.

The village includes part of Como Lake Park, owned and operated by Erie County

Church Street, a street off Broadway, contains many architecturally significant homes.

Lancaster's first immigrants were Dutch. Germans came in the mid-1800s, who founded St. Mary of the Assumption Catholic Church. A later wave of Italian immigrants founded Our Lady of Pompeii Catholic Church.

St. John Neumann was a circuit priest in the mid-1800s around the Buffalo area. St. Mary of the Assumption Church (St. Mary's on the Hill) was one of his stops where he would celebrate mass there once a month and played a big part in the building of the church and school.

== Geography ==
Lancaster is located at 42°54′1″N 78°40′22″W (42.900408, −78.67303), on Cayuga Creek and U.S. Route 20 (Broadway). The village's northern boundary is Walden Avenue, the eastern edge is Walter Winter Road, and the southern edge is the northern boundary of the former Buffalo Creek Indian Reservation. The western boundary is a former farm-lot line which is now Brunswick Road.

According to the United States Census Bureau, the village has a total area of 2.7 square miles (7.1 km^{2}), of which 2.7 square miles (7.0 km^{2}) is land and 0.04 square miles (0.1 km^{2}), or 1.24%, is water.

== Historic buildings ==
The following structures are listed on the National Register of Historic Places listings in Erie County, New York: Bruce-Briggs Brick Block, DePew Lodge No. 823, Free and Accepted Masons, Clark-Lester House, John Richardson House, Lancaster Municipal Building, Liebler-Rohl Gasoline Station, Miller-Mackey House, Dr. John J. Nowak House, John P. Sommers House, US Post Office-Lancaster, Herman B. VanPeyma House, and Zuidema-Idsardi House.

=== Points of interest ===
Central Avenue in the downtown area is the busiest street in the village, along with Broadway. The downtown area contains shops and boutiques. See Central Avenue Historic District.

Como Lake Park in the village is a place to congregate. The lighthouse in Como Lake Park on Cayuga Creek is a place for people of many ages to gather.

Broadway has many large houses and mansions that are architecturally significant. Many of these houses have been changed into businesses and offices. Broadway also contains many historical Protestant churches. See Broadway Historic District.

St. Mary's Cemetery is a historic cemetery located behind St. Mary of the Assumption Church.

Lancaster Town Hall, also known as the Opera House, is located on Central Avenue.

The Lancaster Municipal Building is located on Broadway. It contains all of the village offices, including one of the two village fire halls. The other fire hall is located on W. Drullard Avenue.

Keysa Park contains a public swimming pool. It is located on Vandenburg Avenue.

=== Streets in Lancaster ===
Many of the streets in Lancaster are very large and wide, complemented with large, old trees. Broadway has the oldest trees, while Burwell and Sawyer avenues are the widest residential streets.

Most of Central Avenue north of Sawyer Avenue and south of Hinchey Avenue is below grade level. The reason for this is that three of the four bridges that carry railroads are very close together. All of the streets coming into Central Avenue must slant downwards toward it. The houses on Central Avenue are above street level. Central Avenue is also very wide.

Many of Lancaster's streets still contain original brick underneath the pavement.

== Demographics ==
Historical population
Census	Pop.	Note	%±
1860	1,706		—
1870	1,697		−0.5%
1880	1,602		−5.6%
1890	1,692		5.6%
1900	3,750		121.6%
1910	4,364		16.4%
1920	6,059		38.8%
1930	7,040		16.2%
1940	7,236		2.8%
1950	8,665		19.7%
1960	12,254		41.4%
1970	13,365		9.1%
1980	13,056		−2.3%
1990	11,940		−8.5%
2000	11,188		−6.3%
2010	10,352		−7.5%
2020	10,027		−3.1%
U.S. Decennial Census

As of the census of 2020, there were 10,027 people, 4,876 households, and 1,082 households with children under 18. The population density was 4,155.0 people per square mile (5.8/km^{2}). There were 4,908 housing units at an average density of 1,822.7 per square mile (703.7/km^{2}). The racial makeup of the village was 95.9% White, 1% Black or African American, 0.10% Native American, 0.5% Asian, 0.8% of the village residents identified as other races, and 4.1% from two or more races. Hispanic or Latino of any race were 3% of the population.

There were 4,726 households, out of which 20% had children under the age of 18 living with them, 38.6% were married couples living together, 30% had a female householder with no spouse present, 18% had a male householder with no spouse present, and 37.4% were non-families. The average household size was 2.34 and the average family size was 2.99.

In the village, the population was spread out, with 22.6% under the age of 18, 7.2% from 18 to 24, 30.2% from 25 to 44, 22.2% from 45 to 64, and 17.8% who were 65 years of age or older. The median age was 39 years. For every 100 females, there were 91.1 males. For every 100 females age 18 and over, there were 85.9 males.

The median income for a household in the village was $40,149, and the median income for a family was $53,514. Males had a median income of $39,772 versus $25,839 for females. The per capita income for the village was $20,308. About 3.1% of families and 5.1% of the population were below the poverty line, including 4.4% of those under age 18 and 8.7% of those age 65 or over.

== Major highways ==
- U.S. Route 20 (Broadway), an east-west highway running through the village and town of Lancaster.
- New York State Route 952Q (Walden Ave.), an east-west highway through the village and town of Lancaster. Walden Avenue is the longest non-parkway New York State Reference Route. Walden's reference route number is not signed, but still has reference markers, and is maintained by New York State Department of Transportation (NYSDOT) as other signed routes are.

== Education ==
The Lancaster Central School District includes almost all of the village. A small southwestern part of the village is in the Depew Union Free School District.
