= Dellwood, New York =

Hamlet in New York, United States

Coordinates: 42°55′00″N 78°34′42″W

Dellwood is a small hamlet in the town of Lancaster in Erie County, New York, United States.
