= Town Line Station, New York =

Hamlet in New York, United States

Coordinates: 42°54′05″N 78°34′41″W

Town Line Station is a hamlet in the town of Lancaster in Erie County, New York, United States.
