= Cayuga Creek =

Stream in New York, United States

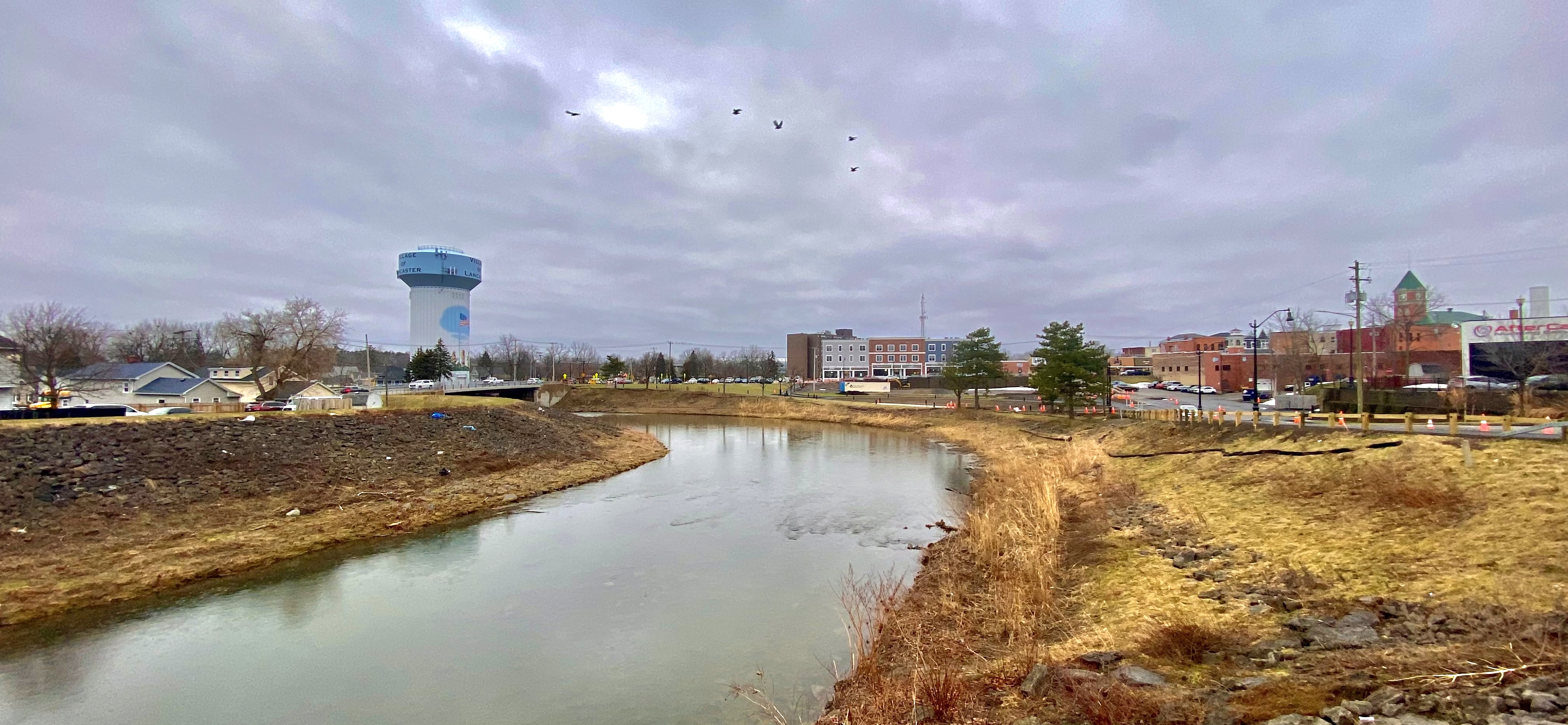
- Cayuga Creek in Lancaster

- Location of the mouth of Cayuga Creek in New York State. Cayuga Creek (the United States)

Location
- Country: United States
- State: New York
- Region: Western New York

Physical characteristics
- Source
  - location: Wyoming County
  - coordinates: 42°42′48″N 78°21′53″W
- Mouth: Buffalo River
  - location: Erie County
  - coordinates: 42°52′12″N 78°47′10″W
- Discharge
  - location: Lancaster, New York

Cayuga Creek is a small stream in western New York, United States, with stretches in both Erie County and Wyoming County. The creek enters Buffalo Creek in the northwest corner of the Town of West Seneca in Erie County, just upstream from the New York State Thruway crossing. At that point, Buffalo Creek becomes the Buffalo River and flows into Lake Erie near Buffalo, New York.

The creek is named after the Cayuga nation, one of the constituent members of the Iroquois Confederacy.

== Cities and settlements ==
The watershed of Cayuga Creek includes the towns of Alden, Cheektowaga, Elma, Lancaster, and Marilla in Erie County and the towns of Bennington and Sheldon in Wyoming County. Village centers along Cayuga Creek include Lancaster and Depew.

A sewage treatment facility in the Town of Cheektowaga discharges into Cayuga Creek upstream of Borden Road. Downstream from Borden Road the creek runs along the Indian Road landfill.

== Parks and history ==
Cayuga Creek runs through the Lancaster Country Club and Como Lake Park in the Town of Lancaster. The Lancaster Country Club diverts some creek water for golf course irrigation. In Como Lake Park, the creek is dammed upstream of Lake Avenue. Farther downstream the creek is an important feature in Stiglmeier Park in the Town of Cheektowaga.

After Cayuga Creek flooded the Village of Lancaster twice in the early 1940s, protective dikes were constructed.

== See also ==
- List of rivers of New York
