= Como Lake Park =

Park in Erie County, New York, US

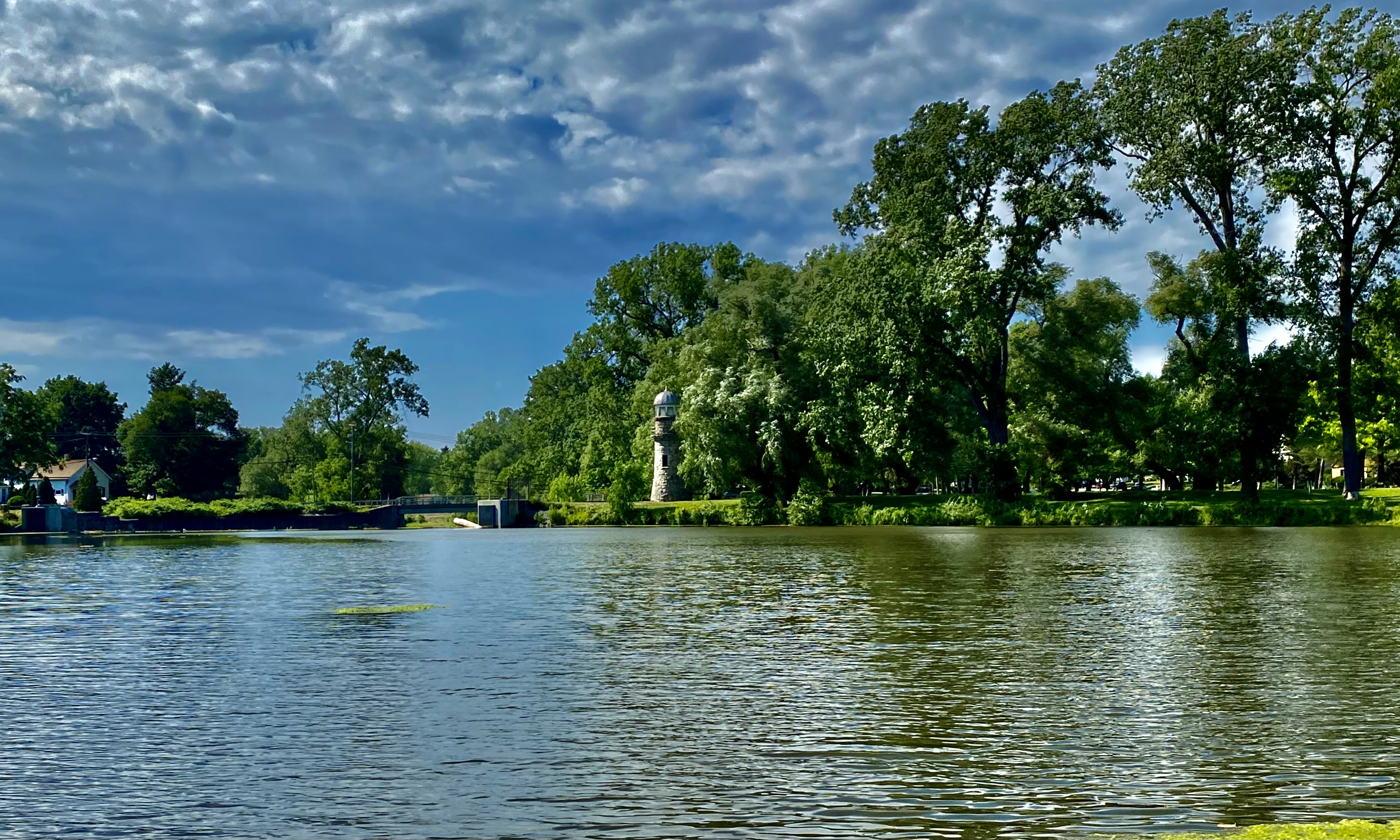
- Como Lake as seen in June 2021

- Location within New York
- Interactive map of Como Lake Park
- Type: Regional park
- Location: 2220 Como Park Blvd; Lancaster, New York
- Nearest city: Buffalo, New York
- Coordinates: 42°53′21″N 78°39′30″W
- Area: 534 acres (2.16 km^{2})
- Created: 1923
- Operator: Erie County Department of Parks, Recreation and Forestry
- Open: All year
- Website: Como Lake Park

Como Lake Park is a 534-acre (2.16 km^{2}) park in Erie County, in the U.S. state of New York. The park is located along the banks of Cayuga Creek in both the village and town of Lancaster, approximately 14 miles (23 km) east of the city of Buffalo. It is operated by the Erie County Department of Parks, Recreation and Forestry. Access is free and it is open to the public year-round.

== History ==
Como Lake Park, named after the Lake Como tourist resort in Italy, was originally established by the village of Lancaster in 1923 and acquired by Erie County in 1926 as the result of a special village election. The park at that time was 120 acres (0.49 km^{2}) in size, and grew to its current 534-acre (2.16 km^{2}) extent through land acquisitions in the years that followed. Many of the park's facilities and stone structures were built or improved by the Works Progress Administration in the 1930s.

The park originally featured a small zoo and a 220-yard (200 m) toboggan run. Both of these attractions have since been removed.

== Attractions and facilities ==
- Como Lake Park features a 4.5-acre (0.018 km^{2}) man-made lake with a small lighthouse.
- The park includes nature trails, 62 picnic shelters, a disc golf course, a soccer field, four tennis courts and two basketball courts.
- During the winter, the park features 4.75 miles (7.64 km) of trails and unplowed roads suitable for cross-country skiing or snowshoeing, two free ice-skating rinks, and a sledding hill.
- Electric vehicle (EV) chargers have been installed in the park.
