= Lancaster District School No. 6 =

- U.S. National Register of Historic Places
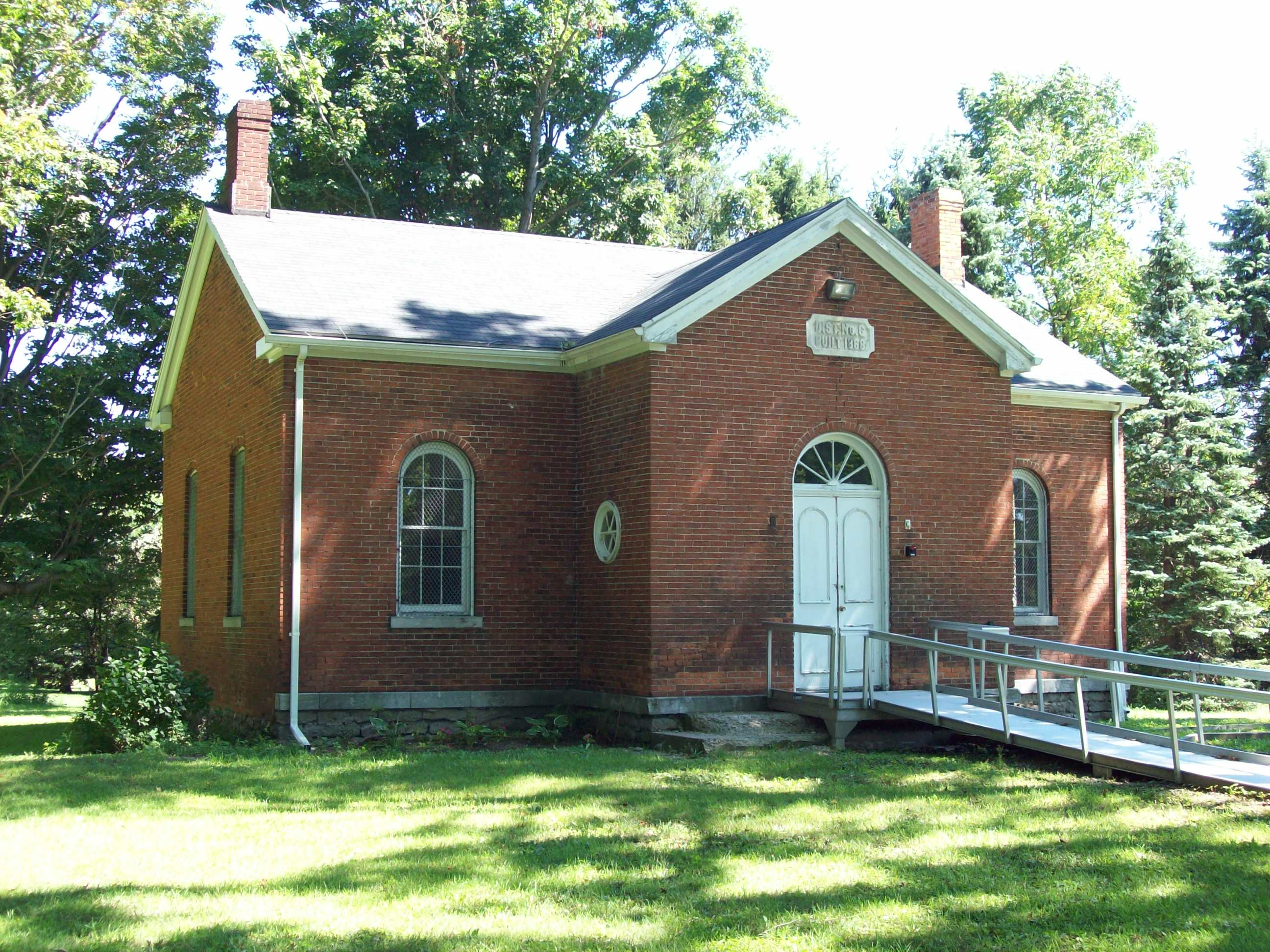
- Lancaster District School No. 6, August 2010

- Location within New York Location within the United States
- Location: 3703 Bowen Rd., Lancaster, New York
- Coordinates: 42°52′53″N 78°38′24″W
- Built: 1868
- Architectural style: Italianate
- NRHP reference No.: 08001076
- Added to NRHP: November 18, 2008

Lancaster District School No. 6, also known as the Little Red Schoolhouse, is a historic school building located at Lancaster in Erie County, New York.

It was listed on the National Register of Historic Places in 2008.
