= Liebler-Rohl Gasoline Station =

- Liebler--Rohl Gasoline Station
- U.S. National Register of Historic Places
- U.S. Historic district – Contributing property
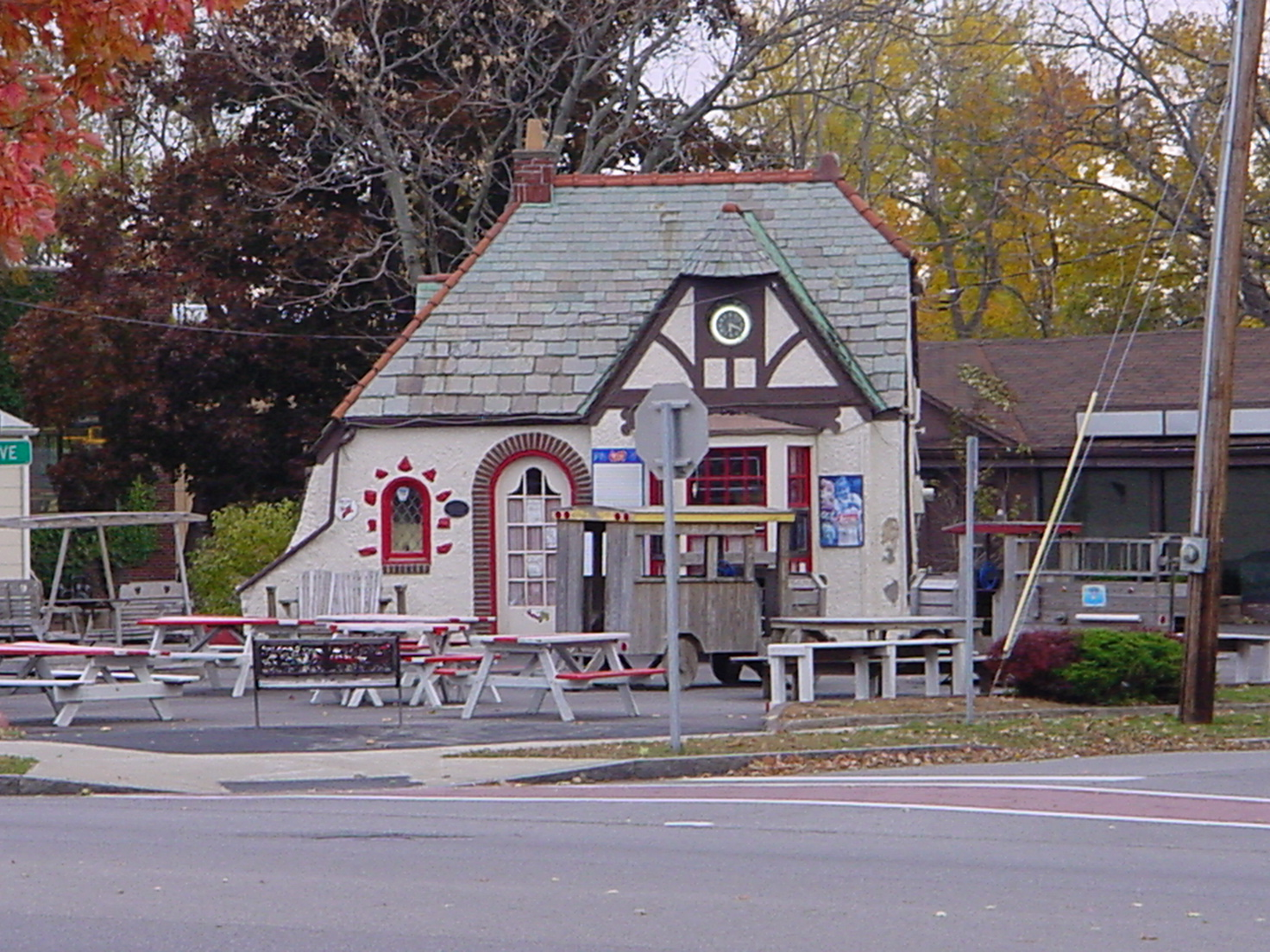
- The former Liebler-Rohl gasoline station.

- Location within New York Location within the United States
- Location: 5500 Broadway, Lancaster, New York
- Coordinates: 42°53′58″N 78°39′59″W
- Area: less than one acre
- Built: 1935
- Architect: Rademacher, John T.
- Architectural style: Tudor Revival
- MPS: Lancaster, New York MPS
- NRHP reference No.: 99001411
- Added to NRHP: November 30, 1999

Liebler—Rohl Gasoline Station is a historic filling station located at Lancaster in Erie County, New York. It is the Village of Lancaster's sole example of historic 20th century roadside commercial architecture. It is in the Tudor Revival style of architecture. It operated as a gasoline station into the 1960s; currently it operates as a seasonal ice cream shop, known as Frosty's.

It was listed on the National Register of Historic Places in 1999. It is located in the Broadway Historic District.
