= Johnson-Jolls Complex =

Historic house in New York, United States

- U.S. National Register of Historic Places
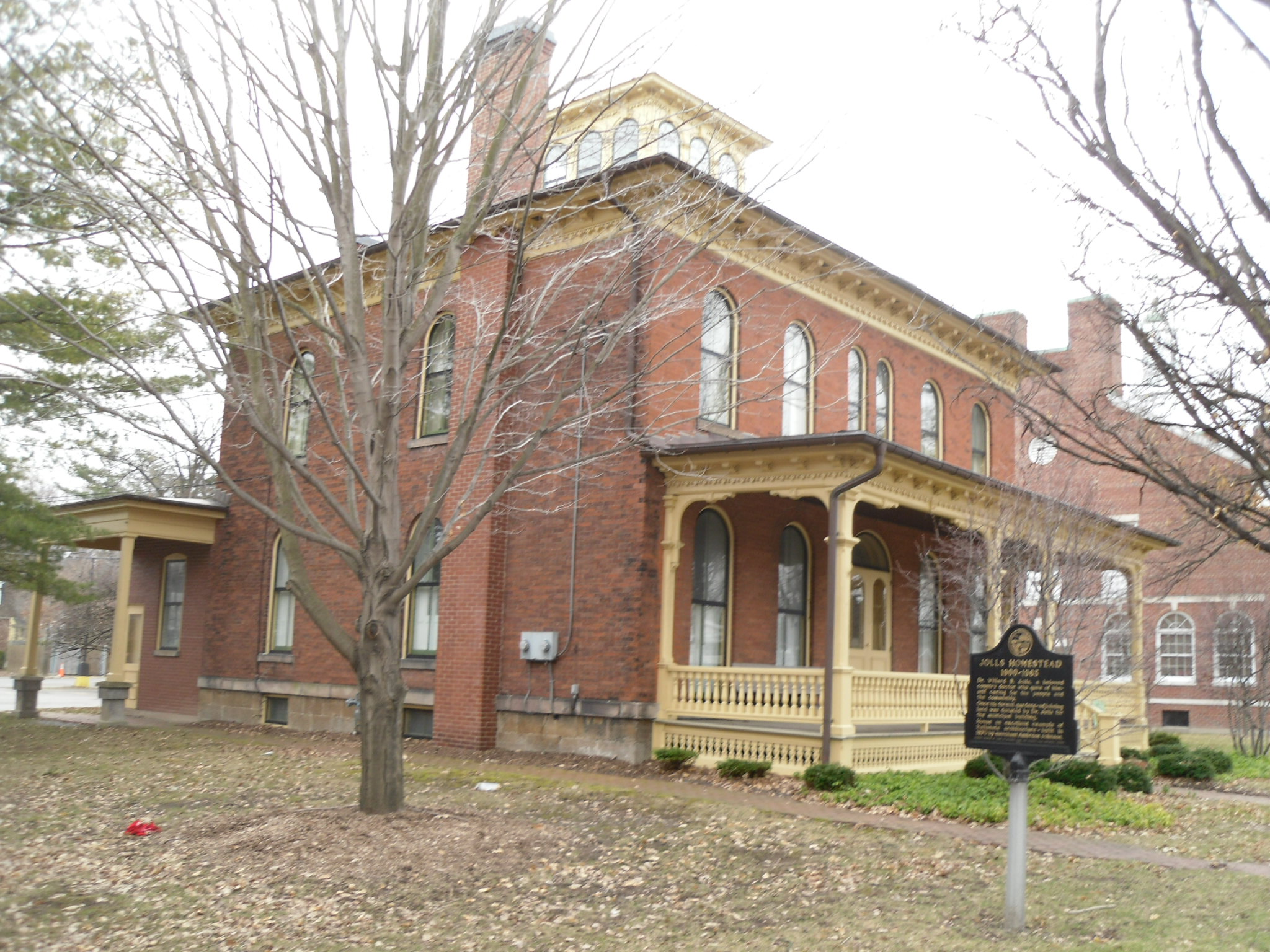
- Johnson-Jolls Complex, March 2010

- Location within New York Location within the United States
- Location: S-4287 S. Buffalo St., Orchard Park, New York
- Coordinates: 42°45′28″N 78°44′39″W
- Built: 1869
- Architectural style: Italianate
- NRHP reference No.: 80002611
- Added to NRHP: May 06, 1980

Johnson-Jolls Complex, also known as the Dr. Willard B. Jolls House, is a historic home located at Orchard Park in Erie County, New York. It is an Italianate style brick house built in 1869. The house was built originally for merchant Ambrose Johnson; in 1902 it was purchased by Dr. Willard B. Jolls who resided there until his death in 1963.

It was listed on the National Register of Historic Places in 1980.
