= Broadway Historic District (Lancaster, New York) =

Historic district in New York, United States

- U.S. National Register of Historic Places
- U.S. Historic district
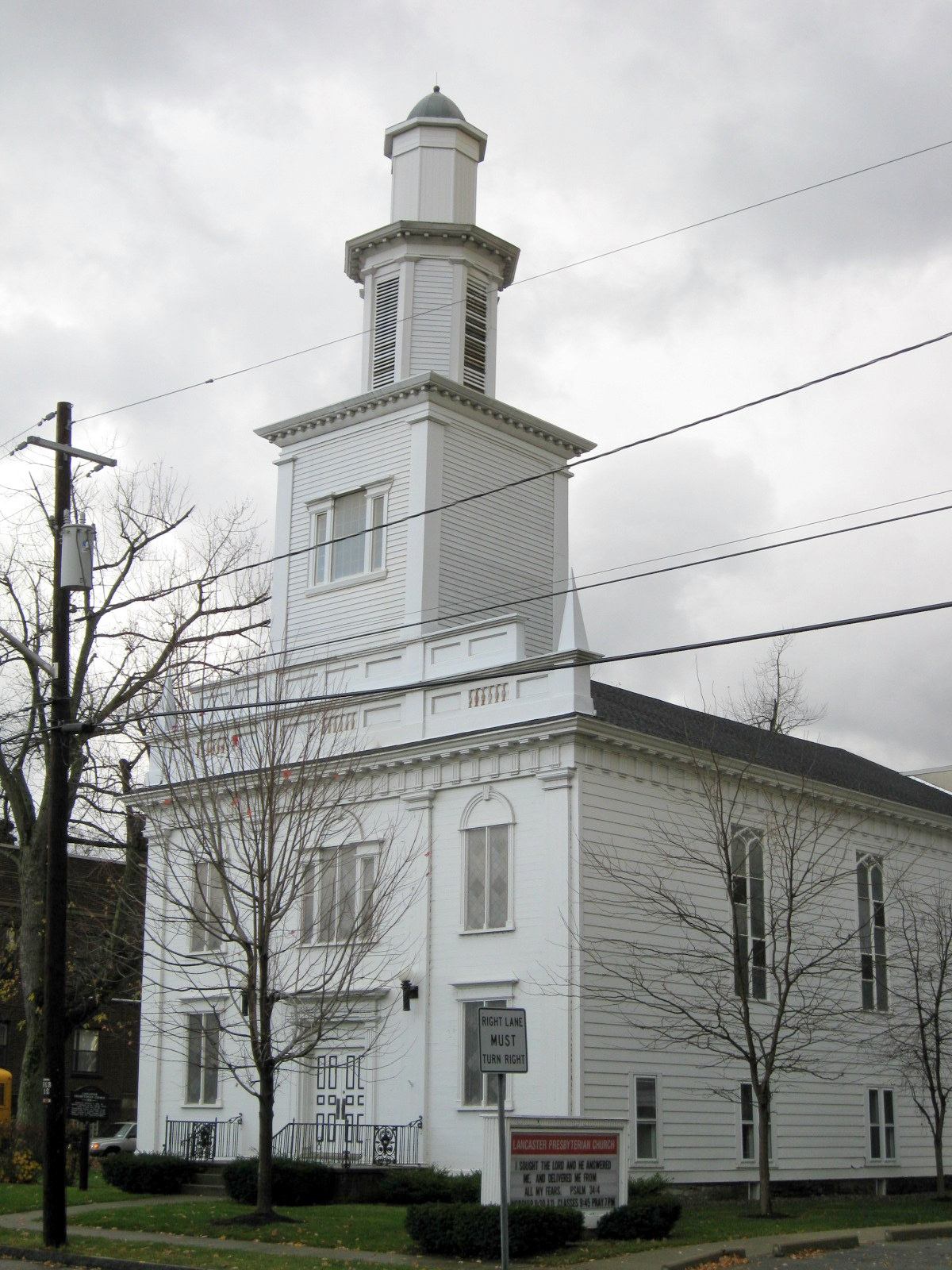
- Lancaster Presbyterian Church, November 2009

- Location within New York Location within the United States
- Location: 5423–5658 Broadway, Lancaster, New York
- Coordinates: 42°54′00″N 78°40′13″W
- Area: 43.09 acres (17.44 ha)
- Built: c. 1831-1940
- Architect: E. B. Green; W.W. Johnson; Mann & Cook; Hudson & Hudson; John D. Rademacher; Frank G. Hanssel
- Architectural style: Greek Revival, Italianate, Queen Anne, Stick/Eastlake, Shingle Style, Colonial Revival, Bungalow/Craftsman
- MPS: Lancaster, New York MPS
- NRHP reference No.: 15000005
- Added to NRHP: February 17, 2015

Broadway Historic District is a national historic district located at Lancaster in Erie County, New York. The district encompasses 85 contributing resources in the village of Lancaster. The district includes a variety of commercial, residential, religious and institutional buildings built between about 1831 and 1940. It includes notable examples of Greek Revival, Italianate, Queen Anne, Colonial Revival, and Bungalow / American Craftsman style architecture. Located in the district are the separately listed Lancaster Municipal Building (1940), Miller-Mackey House (c. 1900), Clark-Lester House (ca. 1891), Bruce-Briggs Brick Block (c. 1855), Lancaster Masonic Lodge Hall (1916-1919), Liebler-Rohl Gasoline Station (c. 1935), Dr. John J. Nowak House (ca. 1930), Zuidema-Idsardi House (c. 1870), Herman B. VanPeyma House (ca. 1890), and John Richardson House (c. 1840). Other notable buildings include the Seeger Store Building (c. 1910), Brost Building (c. 1935) designed by Edward Brodhead Green, Maute House (c. 1880), Depew Lancaster Moose Lodge No. 1605 (c. 1880) B.P.O.E. Lodge/Potter's Hall (c. 1924), and Lancaster Presbyterian Church (1832-1833).

It was listed on the National Register of Historic Places in 2015.
