= United States Post Office (Lancaster, New York) =

- US Post Office--Lancaster
- U.S. National Register of Historic Places
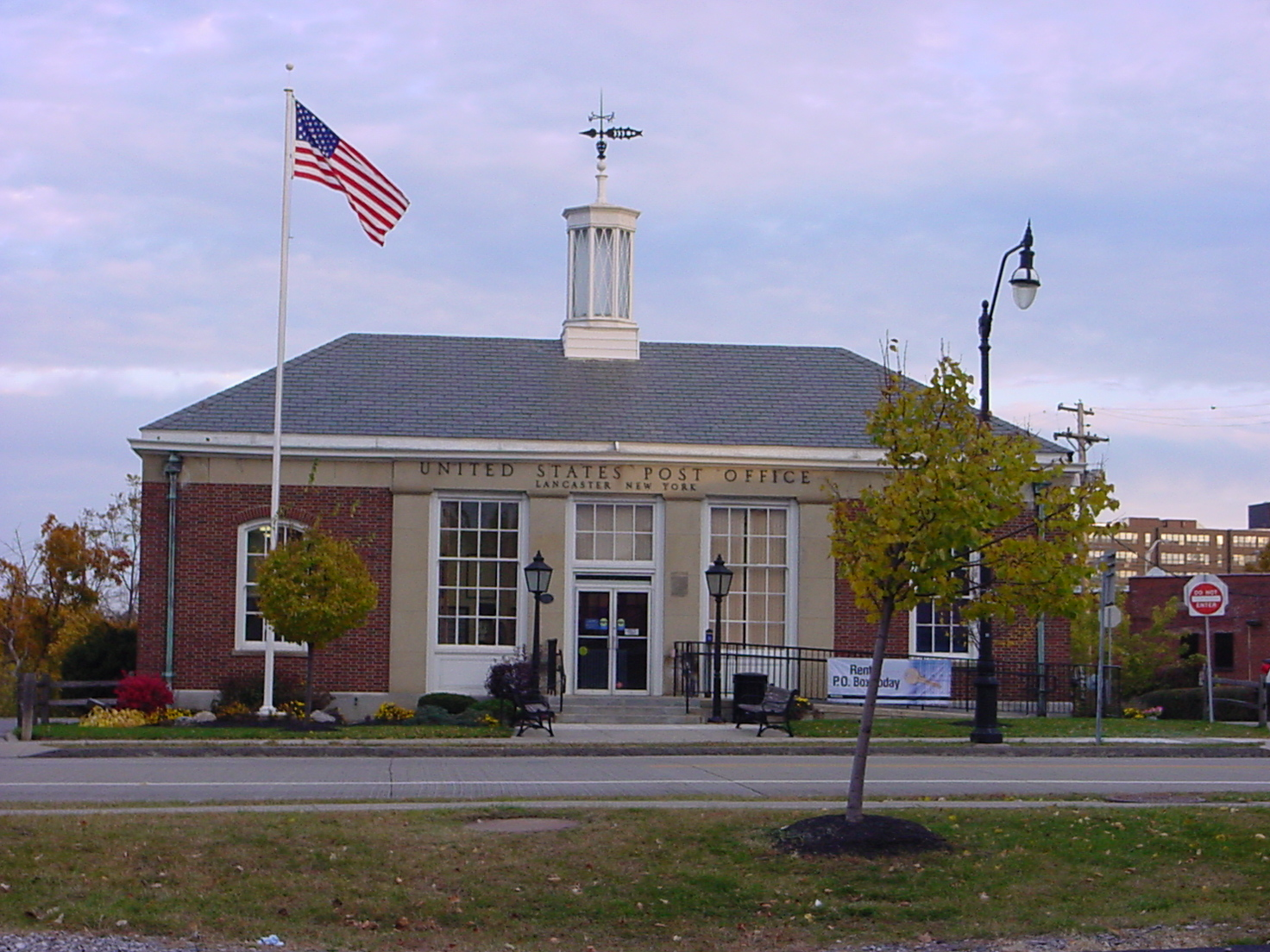
- U.S. Post Office, October 2009

- Location within New York Location within the United States
- Location: 5406 Broadway St., Lancaster, New York
- Coordinates: 42°54′1″N 78°40′17″W
- Built: 1938
- Architect: Louis A. Simon, Arthur Getz
- Architectural style: Colonial Revival
- MPS: US Post Offices in New York State, 1858-1943, TR
- NRHP reference No.: 88002340
- Added to NRHP: May 11, 1989

US Post Office—Lancaster is a historic post office building located at Lancaster in Erie County, New York. It was designed and built 1938–1939, and is one of a number of post offices in New York State designed by the Office of the Supervising Architect of the Treasury Department, Louis A. Simon. The building is in the Colonial Revival style. The interior features a mural by Arthur Getz painted in 1940 and titled Early Commerce in the Erie Canal Region.

It was listed on the National Register of Historic Places in 1989.
