= Central Avenue Historic District (Lancaster, New York) =

Historic district in New York, United States

- U.S. National Register of Historic Places
- U.S. Historic district
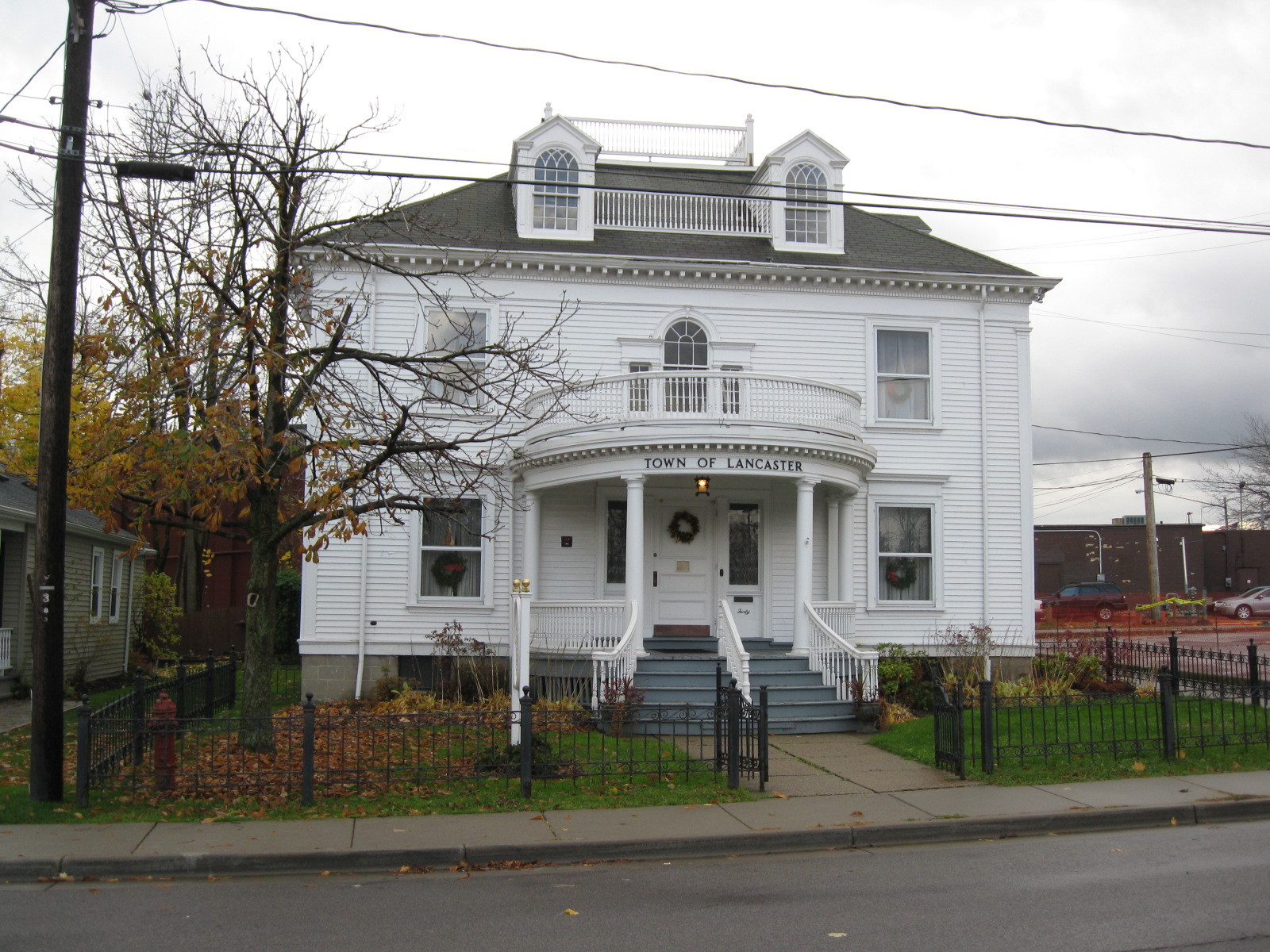
- 40 Clark St., Central Avenue Historic District, November 2009

- Location within New York Location within the United States
- Location: 16-50 Central Ave., 1-5 W. Main & 40 Clark Sts., Lancaster, New York
- Coordinates: 42°54′03″N 78°40′22″W
- Area: 3.82 acres (1.55 ha)
- Built: c. 1860-1940
- Architectural style: Italianate, Colonial Revival
- NRHP reference No.: 14000911
- Added to NRHP: November 12, 2014

Central Avenue Historic District is a national historic district located at Lancaster in Erie County, New York. The district encompasses 17 contributing buildings in the central business district of the village of Lancaster. The district includes a variety of residential, commercial, and government buildings built between about 1860 and 1940. It includes notable examples of Italianate and Colonial Revival style architecture. Notable buildings include the Lancaster Town Hall and Opera House (c. 1894, 1976-1978), Former Post Office (c. 1905), Cushing Block (c. 1896), and Potter-Eaton House (c. 1895, moved 1940).

It was listed on the National Register of Historic Places in 2014.
