= Baker Memorial Methodist Episcopal Church =

Historic church in New York, United States

- U.S. National Register of Historic Places
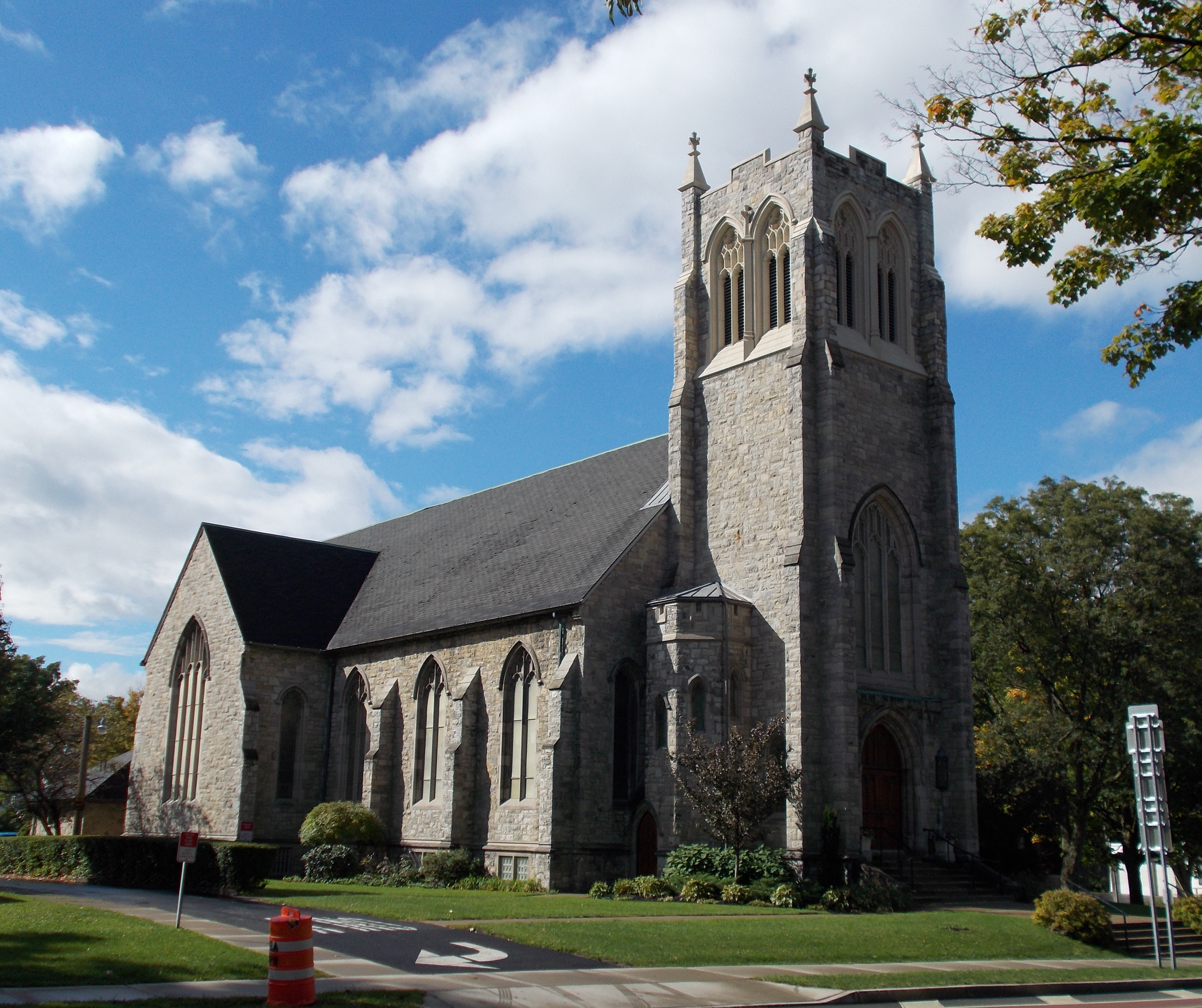
- Baker Memorial Methodist Episcopal Church, September 2012

- Location within New York Location within the United States
- Location: 345 Main St., East Aurora, New York
- Coordinates: 42°46′05″N 78°37′20″W
- Area: 2.3 acres (0.93 ha)
- Built: 1927
- Architect: Bolton, Charles & Sons; Beebe, Milton
- Architectural style: Collegiate Gothic
- NRHP reference No.: 12000981
- Added to NRHP: November 28, 2012

Baker Memorial Methodist Episcopal Church, now known as Baker Memorial United Methodist Church, is a historic Methodist Episcopal church complex located at East Aurora in Erie County, New York. It was built in 1927, and is limestone structure with cat stone trim. It consists of the church, a one-story chapel, and attached parish hall in the Collegiate Gothic style. The church features a three-story entrance tower and opalescent glass windows produced by Louis Comfort Tiffany. Also on the property are a contributing rectory, garage, and frame caretaker's house.

It was listed on the National Register of Historic Places in 2012.
