= John P. Sommers House =

Historic house in New York, United States

- U.S. National Register of Historic Places
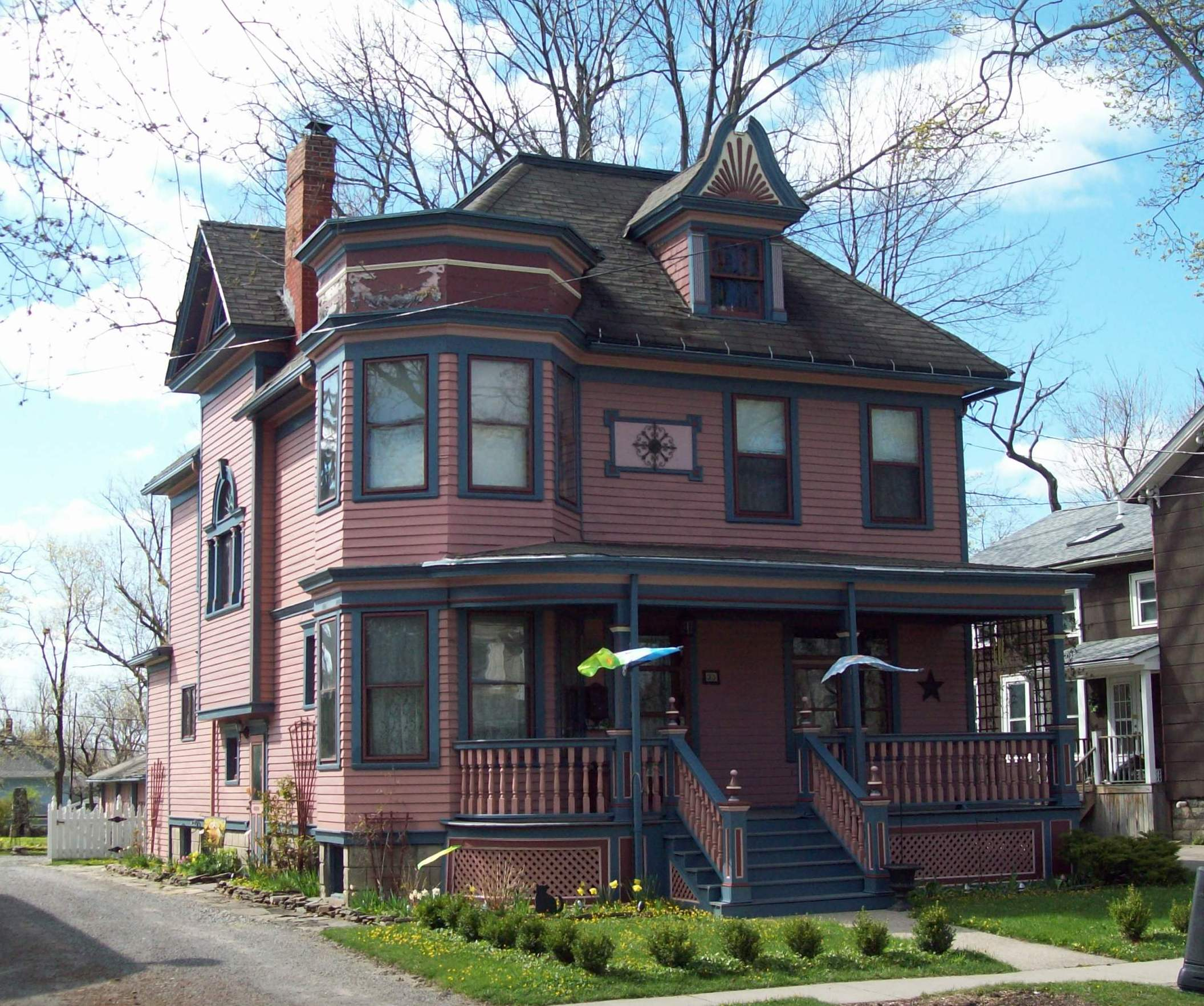
- John P. Sommers House, April 2012

- Location within New York Location within the United States
- Location: 33 Lake Avenue, Lancaster, New York
- Coordinates: 42°53′53″N 78°40′06″W
- Area: less than one acre
- Built: 1906
- Architectural style: Queen Anne
- MPS: Lancaster, New York MPS
- NRHP reference No.: 11000998
- Added to NRHP: January 4, 2011

John P. Sommers House is a historic home located at Lancaster in Erie County, New York. It was built in 1906, and is a 2 1/2-story, wood-frame Queen Anne style dwelling. It has a hipped roof and center projecting gable. It features a prominent two-story, five-sided corner tower and has a single-story porch across the front facade.

It was added to the National Register of Historic Places in 2012.
