= DePew Lodge No. 823, Free and Accepted Masons =

- Depew Lodge No. 823, Free and Accepted Masons
- U.S. National Register of Historic Places
- U.S. Historic district – Contributing property
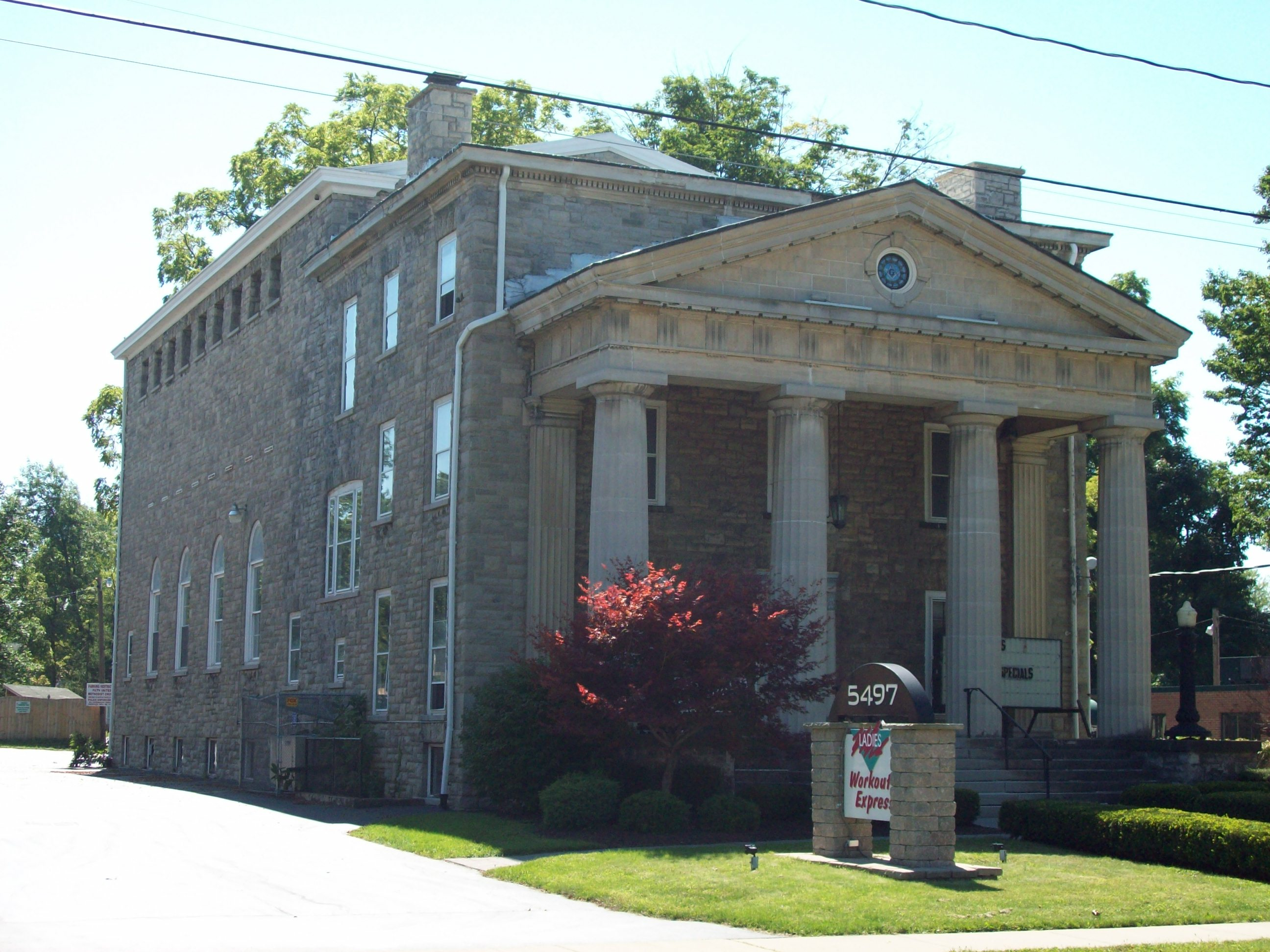
- DePew Lodge No. 823, Free and Accepted Masons, August 2010

- Location within New York Location within the United States
- Location: 5497 Broadway, Lancaster, New York
- Coordinates: 42°53′56″N 78°40′0″W
- Area: less than one acre
- Built: 1916
- Architect: Mann & Cook; Hanssel, Frank G.
- Architectural style: Classical Revival
- Part of: Broadway Historic District
- MPS: Lancaster, New York MPS
- NRHP reference No.: 99001410
- Added to NRHP: November 30, 1999

Depew Lodge No. 823, Free and Accepted Masons is a historic building located at Lancaster in Erie County, New York as a Masonic Hall. It is a locally distinctive example of the Neo-Classical Revival style of architecture. It was built between 1916 and 1919 as a meeting hall for the DePew Lodge No. 823, which no longer exists. Today, it is used as a commercial office building.

It was listed on the National Register of Historic Places in 1999. It is included in the Broadway Historic District.
