= John Richardson House (Lancaster, New York) =

Historic house in New York, United States

- U.S. National Register of Historic Places
- U.S. Historic district – Contributing property
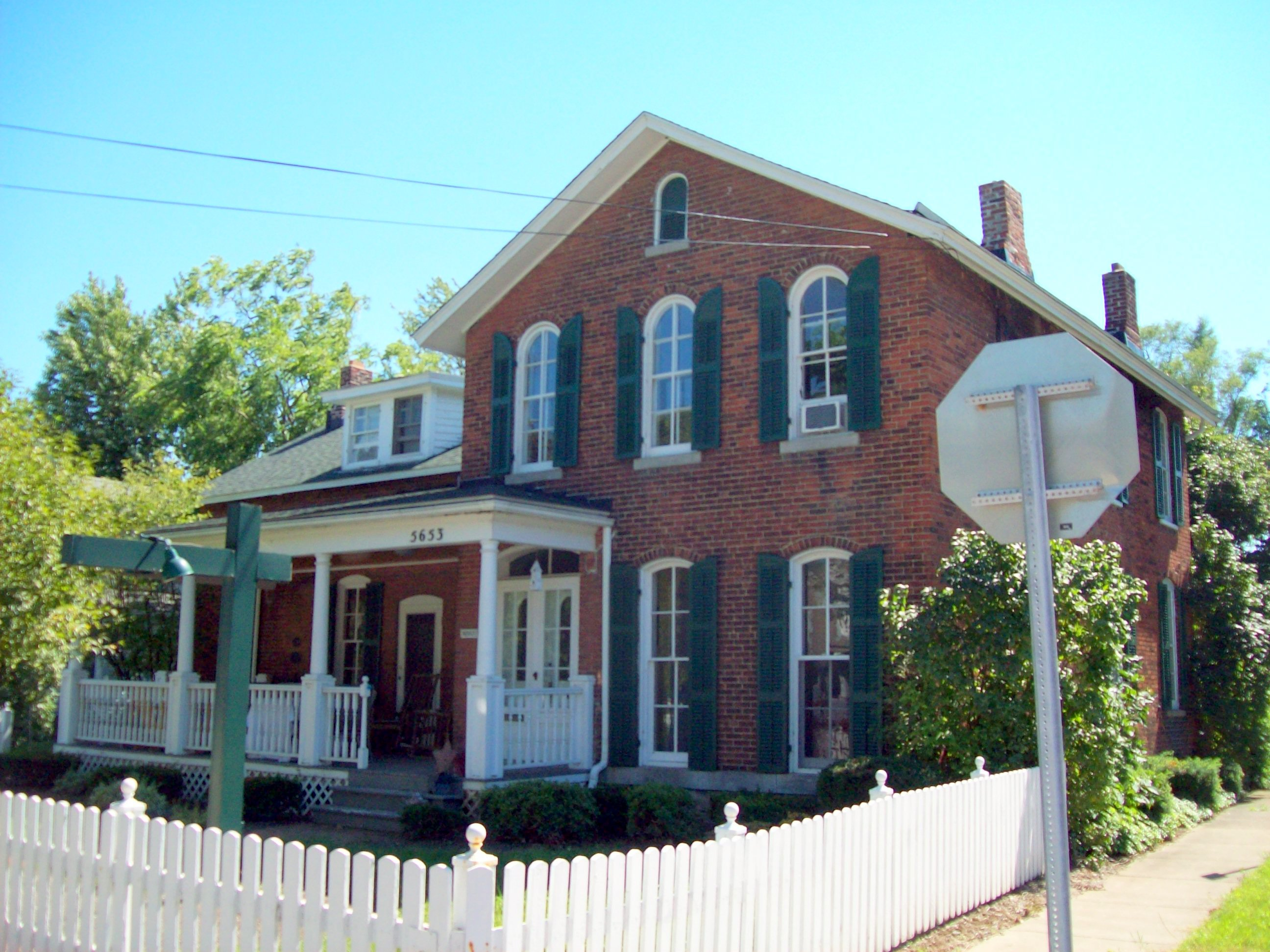
- John Richardson House, August 2010

- Location within New York Location within the United States
- Location: 5653 Broadway, Lancaster, New York
- Coordinates: 42°53′48″N 78°39′29″W
- Area: less than one acre
- Built: 1840
- Built by: Richardson, John
- Architectural style: Italianate
- MPS: Lancaster, New York MPS
- NRHP reference No.: 99001419
- Added to NRHP: November 30, 1999

John Richardson House is a historic home located at Lancaster in Erie County, New York. It is a locally significant and distinct example of the vernacular interpretation of Italianate style. It was built about 1840 by John Richardson, a local brickmaker and builder.

It was listed on the National Register of Historic Places in 1999. It is located in the Broadway Historic District.
