= Miller-Mackey House =

Historic house in New York, United States

- U.S. National Register of Historic Places
- U.S. Historic district – Contributing property
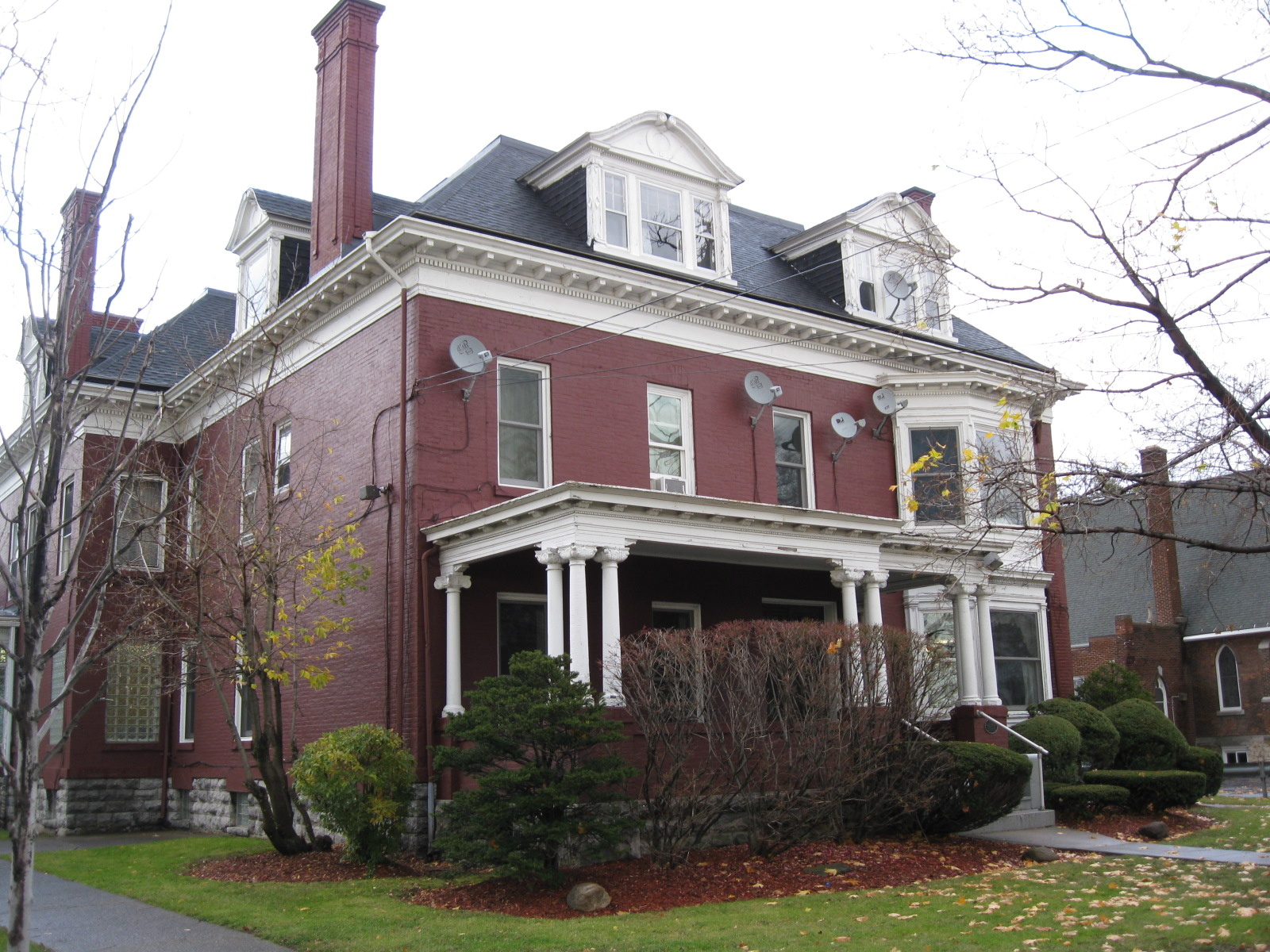
- Miller-Mackey House, November 2009

- Location within New York Location within the United States
- Location: 5440 Broadway, Lancaster, New York
- Coordinates: 42°54′1″N 78°40′9″W
- Area: less than one acre
- Built: 1905
- Architectural style: Colonial Revival
- MPS: Lancaster, New York MPS
- NRHP reference No.: 99001422
- Added to NRHP: November 30, 1999

Miller—Mackey House is a historic home located at Lancaster in Erie County, New York. It is a locally distinctive example of the Colonial Revival style of architecture built in 1905 for Dr. John G. Miller. In 1957, the Depew Lancaster Boys' Club purchased the property and since that time has been used as a recreational and social facility for the area's young people.

It was listed on the National Register of Historic Places in 1999. It is located in the Broadway Historic District.
