= Dr. John J. Nowak House =

Historic house in New York, United States

- U.S. National Register of Historic Places
- U.S. Historic district – Contributing property
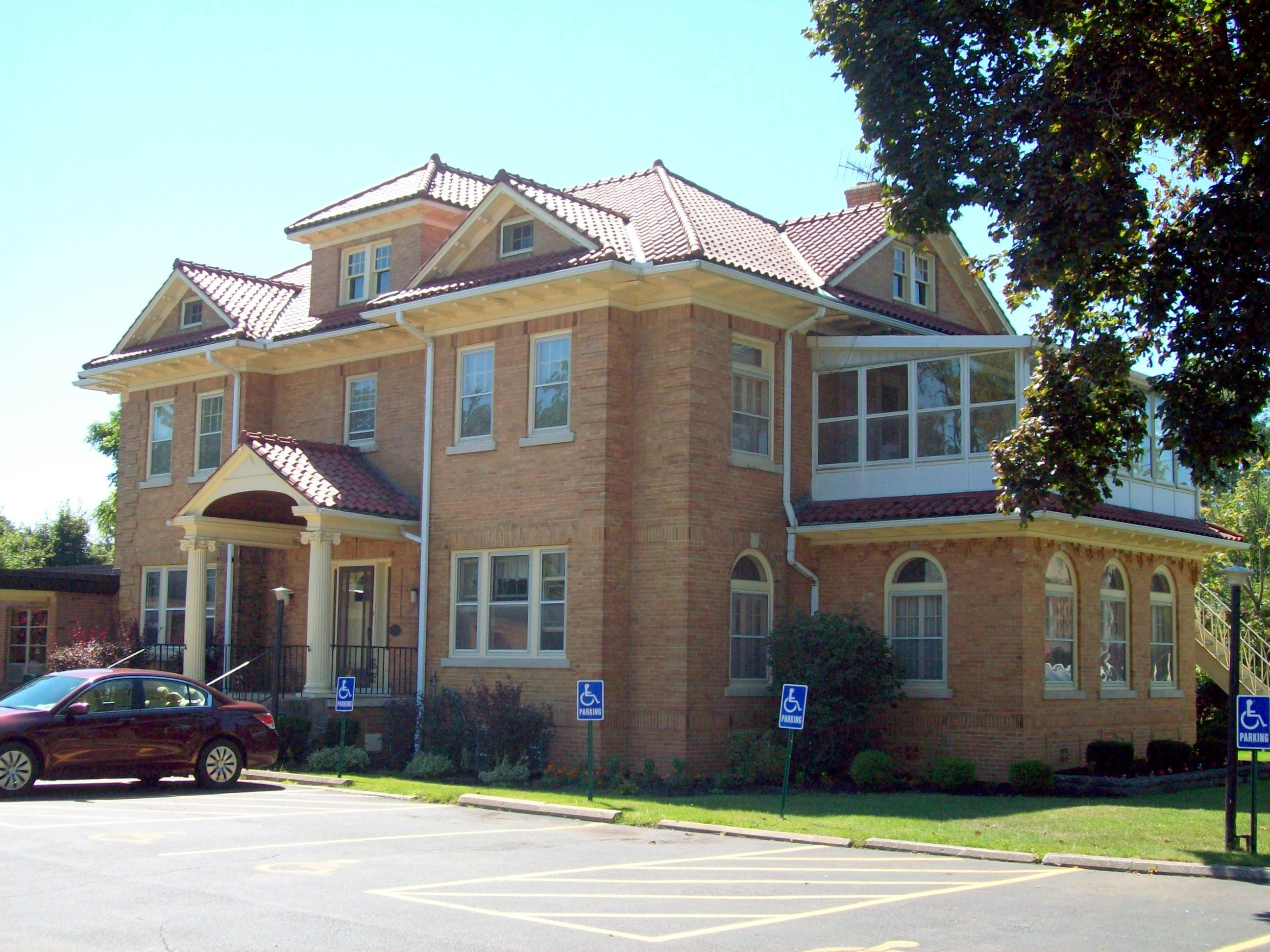
- Dr. John J. Nowak House, August 2010

- Location within New York Location within the United States
- Location: 5539 Broadway, Lancaster, New York
- Coordinates: 42°53′51″N 78°39′49″W
- Area: less than one acre
- Built: 1929
- Architectural style: Mission/spanish Revival
- MPS: Lancaster, New York MPS
- NRHP reference No.: 99001414
- Added to NRHP: November 30, 1999

Dr. John J. Nowak House is a historic home located at Lancaster in Erie County, New York. It is a locally significant and distinct example of the Spanish Revival style built for Dr. John J. Nowak in 1930. Several additions were built throughout the years and it is now used as a nursing home.

It was listed on the National Register of Historic Places in 1999. It is located in the Broadway Historic District.
