= Zuidema-Idsardi House =

Historic house in New York, United States

- U.S. National Register of Historic Places
- U.S. Historic district – Contributing property
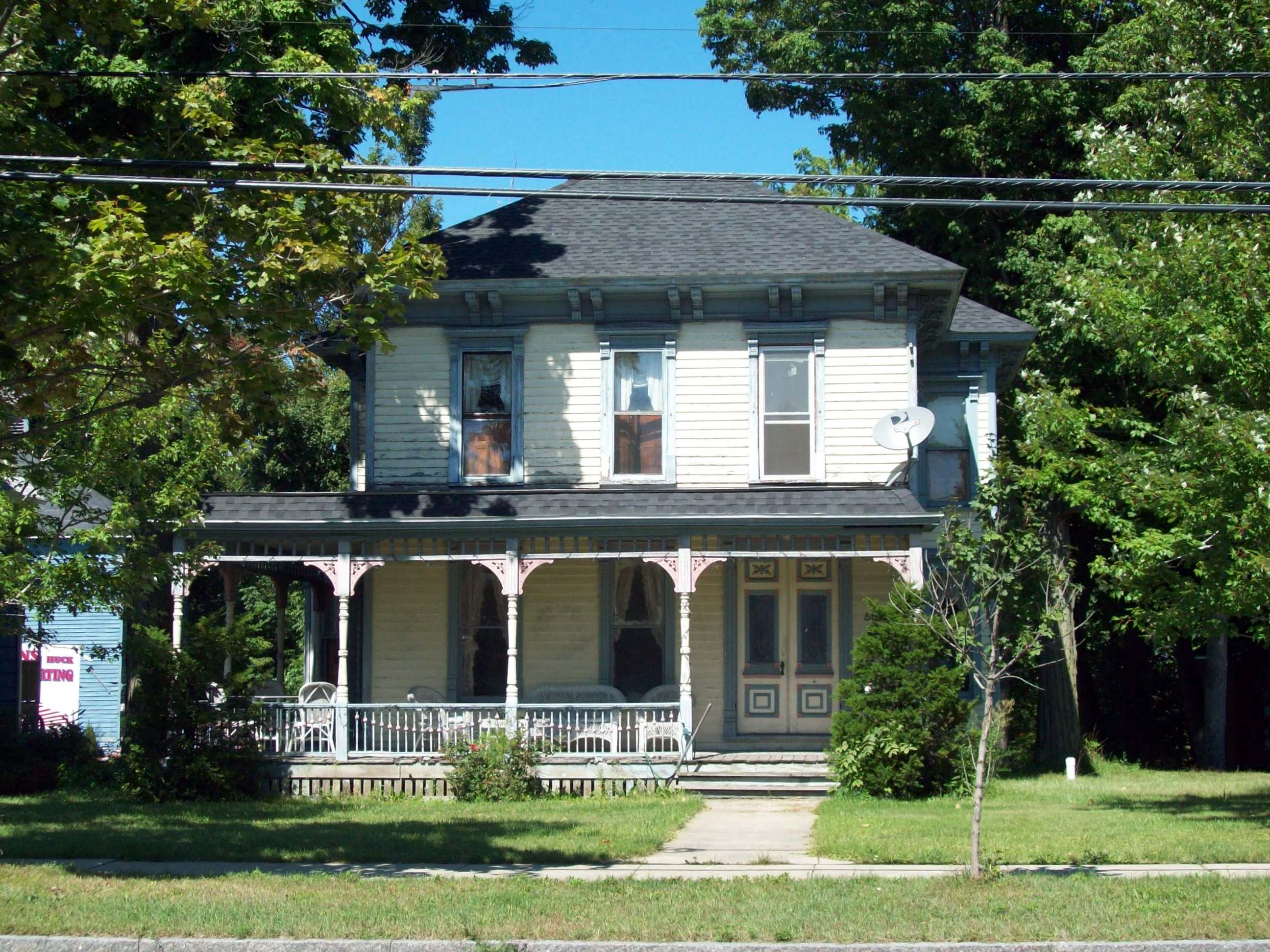
- Zuidema-Idsardi House, August 2010

- Location within New York Location within the United States
- Location: 5556 Broadway, Lancaster, New York
- Coordinates: 42°53′54″N 78°39′45″W
- Area: less than one acre
- Built: c. 1876
- Architectural style: Stick/eastlake, Italianate
- MPS: Lancaster, New York MPS
- NRHP reference No.: 99001416
- Added to NRHP: November 30, 1999

Zuidema-Idsardi House is a historic home located at Lancaster in Erie County, New York. It is a locally significant and distinct example of the vernacular interpretation of Italianate style, incorporating elements of Eastlake movement ornamentation. It was built for John H. Zuidema, a local Dutch businessman, circa 1876.

It was listed on the National Register of Historic Places in 1999. It is located in the Broadway Historic District.
