= Bruce-Briggs Brick Block =

Historic houses in New York, United States

- U.S. National Register of Historic Places
- U.S. Historic district – Contributing property
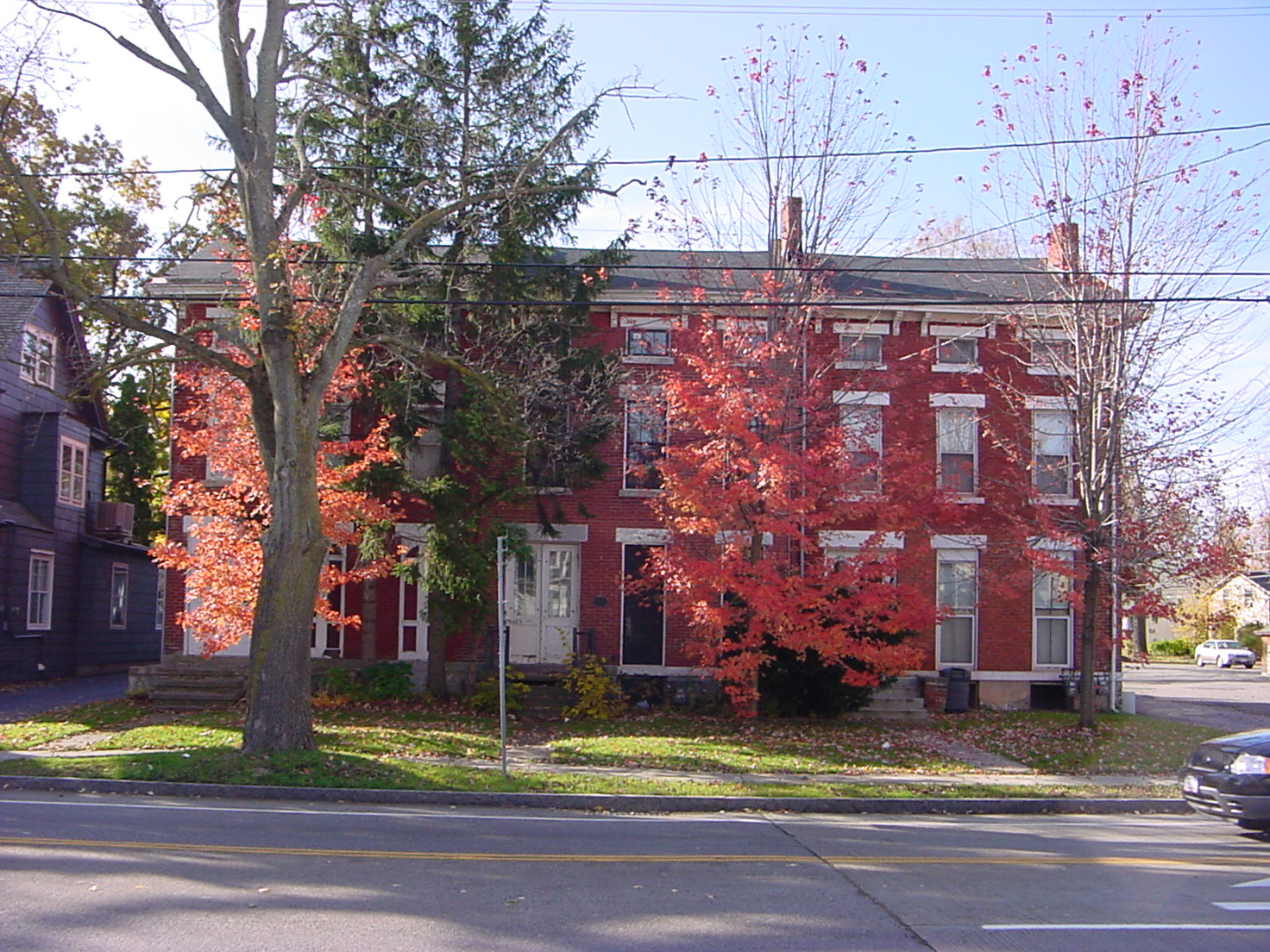
- Bruce-Briggs Brick Block, October 2009

- Location within New York Location within the United States
- Location: 5481-5483-5485 Broadway, Lancaster, New York
- Coordinates: 42°53′57″N 78°40′2″W
- Area: less than one acre
- Built: 1855
- Architectural style: Greek Revival, Italianate
- MPS: Lancaster, New York MPS
- NRHP reference No.: 99001409
- Added to NRHP: November 30, 1999

Bruce—Briggs Brick Block is a historic rowhouse block located at Lancaster in Erie County, New York. It is a mid-19th century brick structure unique in Western New York, which incorporates both Greek Revival and Italianate style decorative details. The rowhouses were built for George Bruce, one of the early settlers of Lancaster.

It was listed on the National Register of Historic Places in 1999. It is located in the Broadway Historic District.
