= Clark–Lester House =

Historic house in New York, United States

- U.S. National Register of Historic Places
- U.S. Historic district – Contributing property
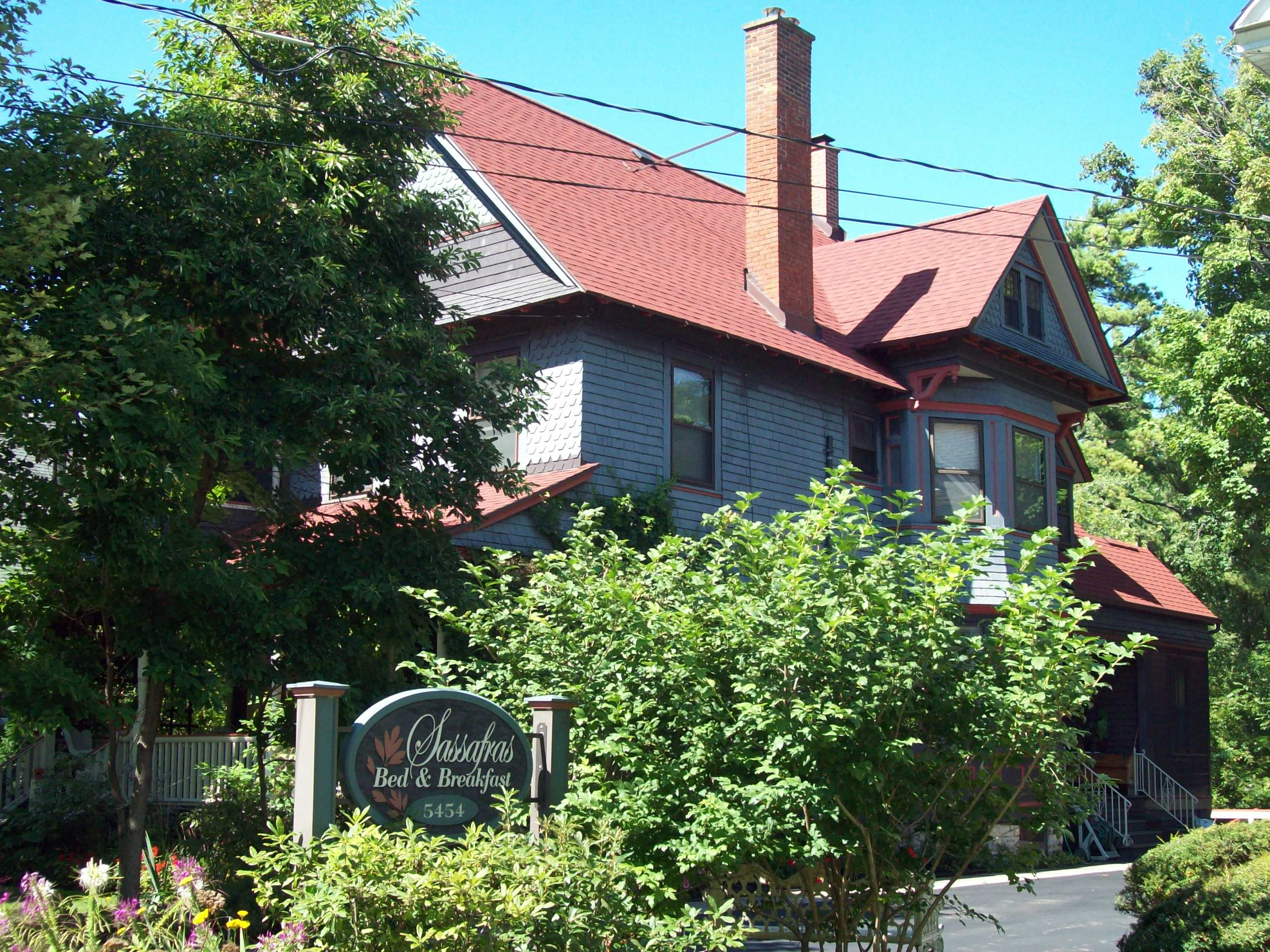
- Clark–Lester House, August 2010

- Location within New York Location within the United States
- Location: 5454 Broadway, Lancaster, New York
- Coordinates: 42°54′0″N 78°40′6″W
- Area: less than one acre
- Built: 1891
- Architectural style: Queen Anne
- MPS: Lancaster, New York MPS
- NRHP reference No.: 99001408
- Added to NRHP: November 30, 1999

The Clark–Lester House is a historic home located at Lancaster in Erie County, New York. It is a Queen Anne style dwelling constructed about 1891. It was home to noted psychology professor Olive Lester, who lived here for most of her adult life until May 1996. She was the first woman chair of any of the departments at the University at Buffalo. It is now operated as a bed and breakfast.

It was listed on the National Register of Historic Places in 1999. It is located in the Broadway Historic District.
