= Herman B. VanPeyma House =

Historic house in New York, United States

- U.S. National Register of Historic Places
- U.S. Historic district – Contributing property
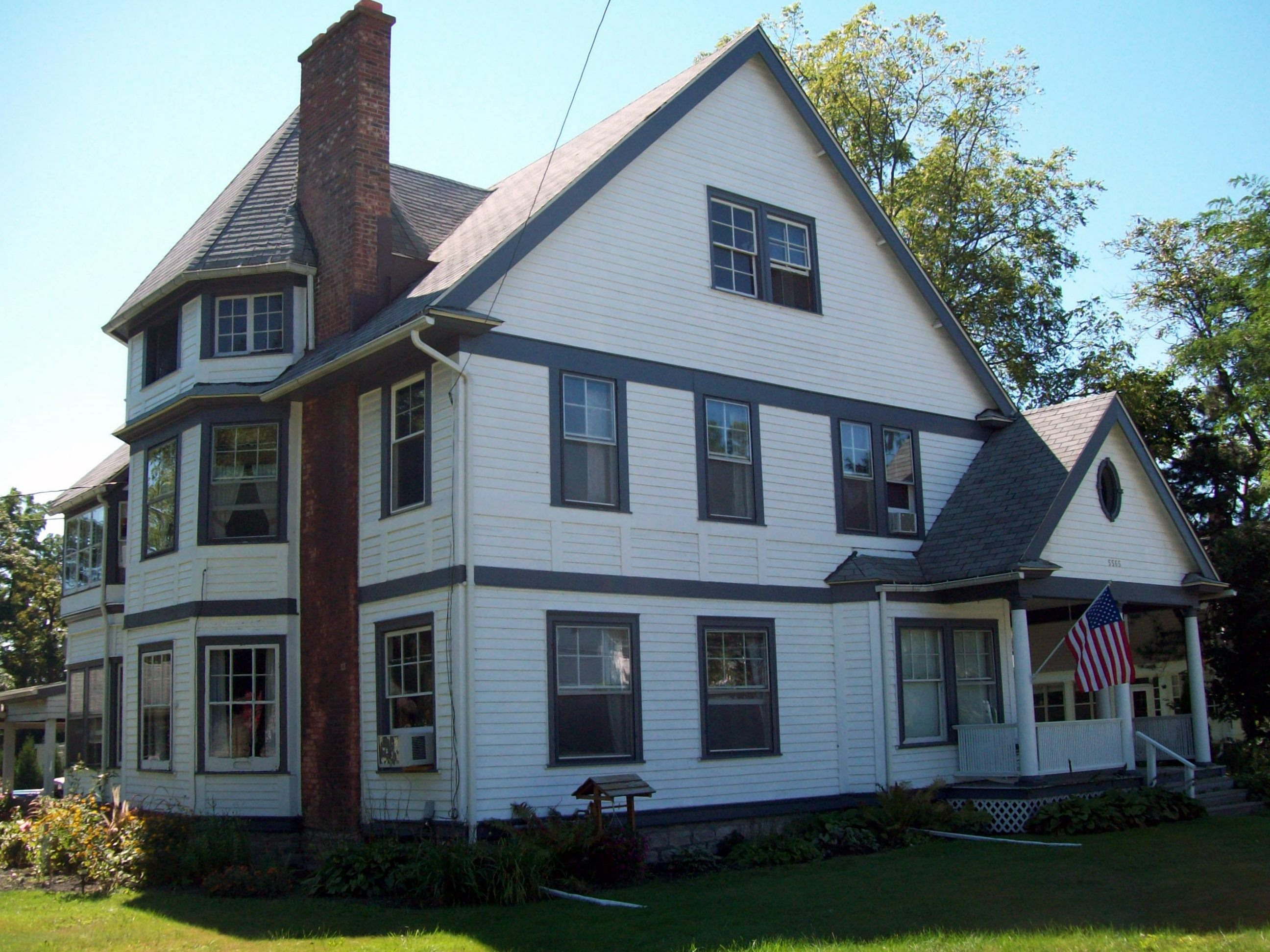
- Herman B. VanPeyma House, August 2010

- Location within New York Location within the United States
- Location: 5565 Broadway, Lancaster, New York
- Coordinates: 42°53′51″N 78°39′42″W
- Area: less than one acre
- Built: c. 1890
- Architectural style: Queen Anne, Stick/eastlake
- MPS: Lancaster, New York MPS
- NRHP reference No.: 99001417
- Added to NRHP: November 30, 1999

Herman B. VanPeyma House is a historic home located at Lancaster in Erie County, New York. It is a locally significant distinct example of the eclectic architecture featuring the Queen Anne style, built circa 1890. It was built for Herman Boetkhout VanPeyma, an early Dutch immigrant to the Town of Lancaster.

It was listed on the National Register of Historic Places in 1999. It is located in the Broadway Historic District.
