= Lancaster Municipal Building (Lancaster, New York) =

- U.S. National Register of Historic Places
- U.S. Historic district – Contributing property
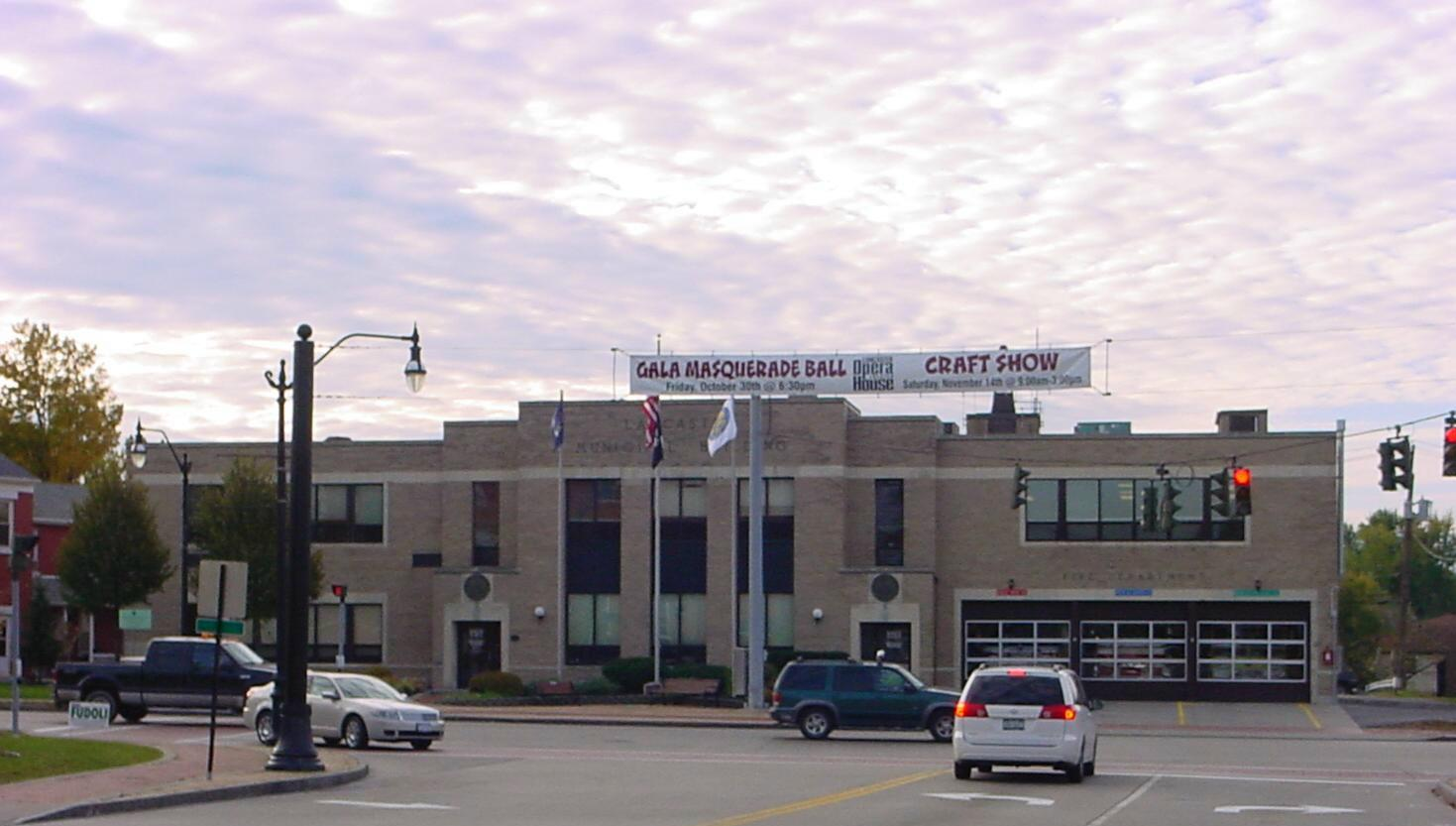

- Location within New York Location within the United States
- Location: 5423 Broadway, Lancaster, New York
- Coordinates: 42°54′0″N 78°40′14″W
- Area: less than one acre
- Built: 1940
- Architect: Hudson & Hudson; Wing, Charles H.
- Architectural style: Moderne
- MPS: Lancaster, New York MPS
- NRHP reference No.: 99001420
- Added to NRHP: November 30, 1999

Lancaster Municipal Building is a historic municipal building in Lancaster, Erie County, New York. It is also known as Lancaster Village Hall, and was built in 1940.

It was listed on the National Register of Historic Places in 1999. It is located in the Broadway Historic District.
