= Christopher Scanlon =

American politician (born 1981)

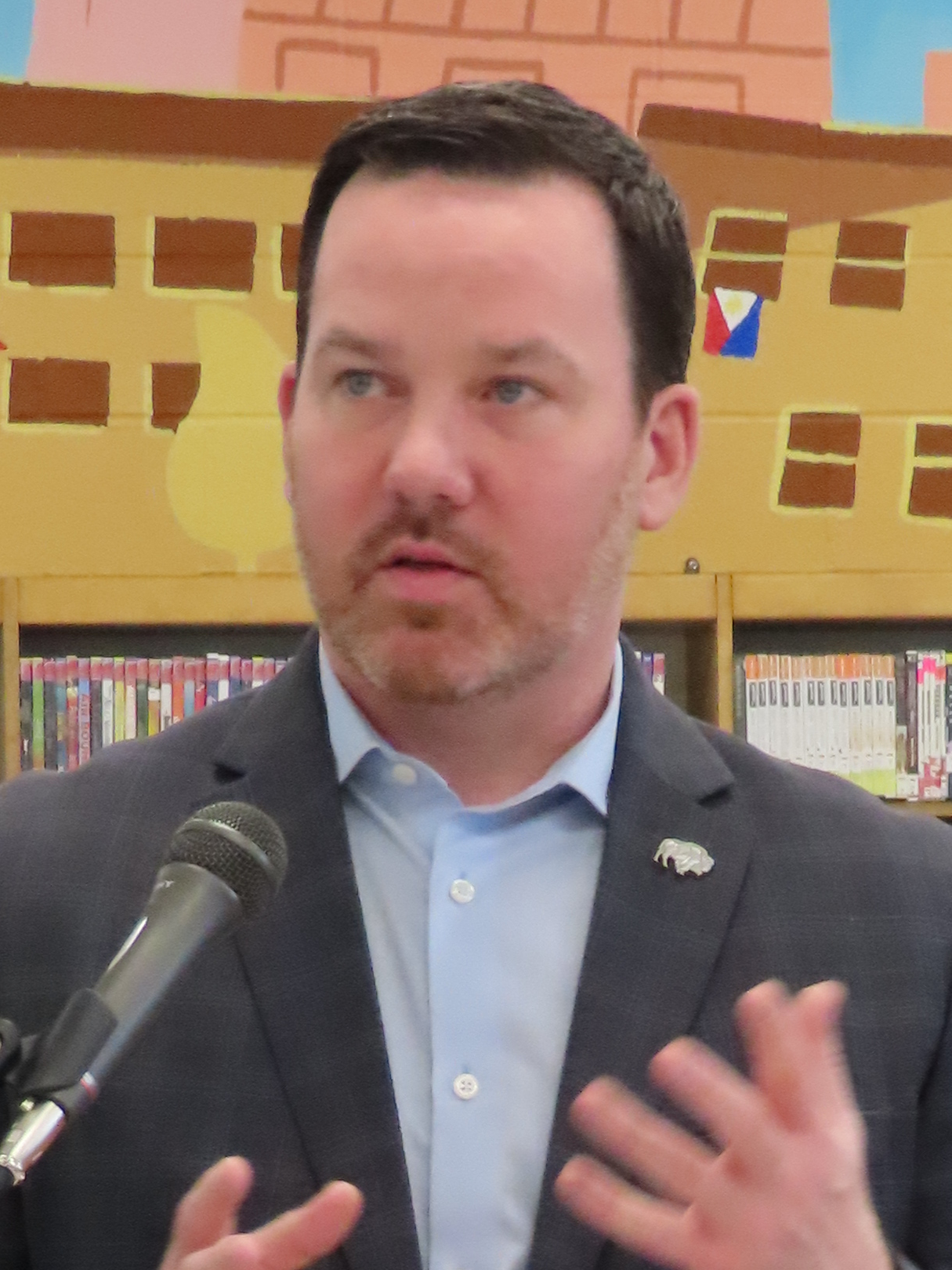

Mayor of Buffalo
- Acting
- In office October 15, 2024 – December 31, 2025
- Preceded by: Byron Brown
- Succeeded by: Sean Ryan

President of the Buffalo Common Council
- In office October 15, 2024 – January 2, 2026
- Preceded by: Darius Pridgen
- Succeeded by: Joel Feroleto

President pro tempore of the Buffalo Common Council
- In office January 2, 2019 – January 2, 2024
- Preceded by: David Rivera
- Succeeded by: Bryan Bollman

Member of the Buffalo Common Council from the South district
- Incumbent
- Assumed office May 16, 2012
- Preceded by: Michael P. Kearns

Personal details
- Born: August 6, 1981 (age 45) Buffalo, New York, U.S.
- Party: Democratic
- Spouse: Katie Wopperer
- Children: 3
- Education: Erie Community College (AS); Buffalo State University (BS)

Christopher P. Scanlon (born August 6, 1981) is an American politician who served as acting mayor of Buffalo, New York from 2024 to 2025. He became Buffalo's 63rd mayor upon the resignation of Byron Brown on October 15, 2024.

He was previously a member of the Buffalo Common Council, representing the South District from May 2012 to October 2024.

Scanlon ran in the 2025 Buffalo mayoral election and lost the Democratic primary, and served the remainder of Brown's term before returning to his vacant common council seat and the council presidency.

== Early life and education ==
Christopher Scanlon was born to father John P. "Scanoots" Scanlon (1938–2022) and mother Paula Scanlon (née Kuntz).

His father was vice chairman of the Erie County Democratic Committee and aide to both Mayor James D. Griffin and Mayor Anthony Masiello. John P. Scanlon was never paid directly for his political work, but collected multiple salaries for local government jobs.

His family is of Irish descent, and he was raised in South Buffalo. Scanlon attended grade school at the local St. Thomas Aquinas Church. His six siblings also attended private school.

He is a graduate of Bishop Timon – St. Jude High School, and holds both an associate's degree in business administration from Erie Community College and a bachelor's degree in business administration from Buffalo State University.

== Political career ==
Scanlon was appointed to the Buffalo Common Council in May 2012, filling the South District seat vacated by Michael P. Kearns who had left to join the New York State Assembly. His appointment was attributed to patronage due to his father's political connections, as he lacked a four-year college degree and relevant experience. Scanlon had to that point worked as a manager for UPS and a local restaurant chain. The appointment was confirmed with a 5–3 vote by the council. Scanlon was later criticized for failing to disclose a 2007 conviction for driving while ability-impaired prior to the appointment.

He won a September 2012 Democratic primary, defeating A. J. Verel, Kevin Lafferty and Patrick B. Burke. Endorsements were received from politicians including Brian Higgins, Carl Paladino, Mark J. F. Schroeder and Michael P. Kearns. In a November 2012 special election, Scanlon defeated A. J. Verel to retain the South District seat. He was later re-elected in 2015 and 2019 after winning uncontested elections.

As a council member, Scanlon often voted in favor of the policies of Mayor Byron Brown. His top donors included prominent conservatives, such as real estate mogul Carl Paladino. Scanlon is credited with spearheading the write-in campaign that led to Byron Brown defeating progressive challenger India Walton in the 2021 Buffalo mayoral election.

After his re-election following another uncontested race in 2023, Scanlon was elected President of the Buffalo Common Council in January 2024 with a 8–1 council vote.

Upon the resignation of Byron Brown, Scanlon succeeded him to become acting Mayor of Buffalo in October 2024. After his unsuccessful bid for the Democratic nomination for mayor, Scanlon dropped out of the 2025 Buffalo mayoral election. Scanlon also announced he would serve the remainder of Brown's term and then return to serving as Buffalo Common Council president.

== Personal life ==
When you grow up in a household involved in all those previous campaigns, if nothing else, you learn by osmosis.

— Christopher Scanlon

He is married to his wife Katie Scanlon (née Wopperer) and they have three children. Katie works as Bingo Inspector for the City of Buffalo. Scanlon is Catholic.

Five of his six siblings work for the City of Buffalo. His brothers Brian and Patrick work for the Buffalo Fire Department, and his brothers Michael and John work for the Department of Public Works. Brian is also a restaurateur, owning Forty Thieves Kitchen & Bar in downtown Buffalo. Scanlon's sister Kara works for the Buffalo Police Department. Lastly, his brother Mark worked as a sergeant for the Erie County Sheriff's Office before dying in a November 2024 hunting accident.

Political offices
Preceded by Byron Brown	Mayor of Buffalo; Acting; 2024–2025	Succeeded by Sean Ryan
