= 2025 Buffalo mayoral election =

- November 4, 2025
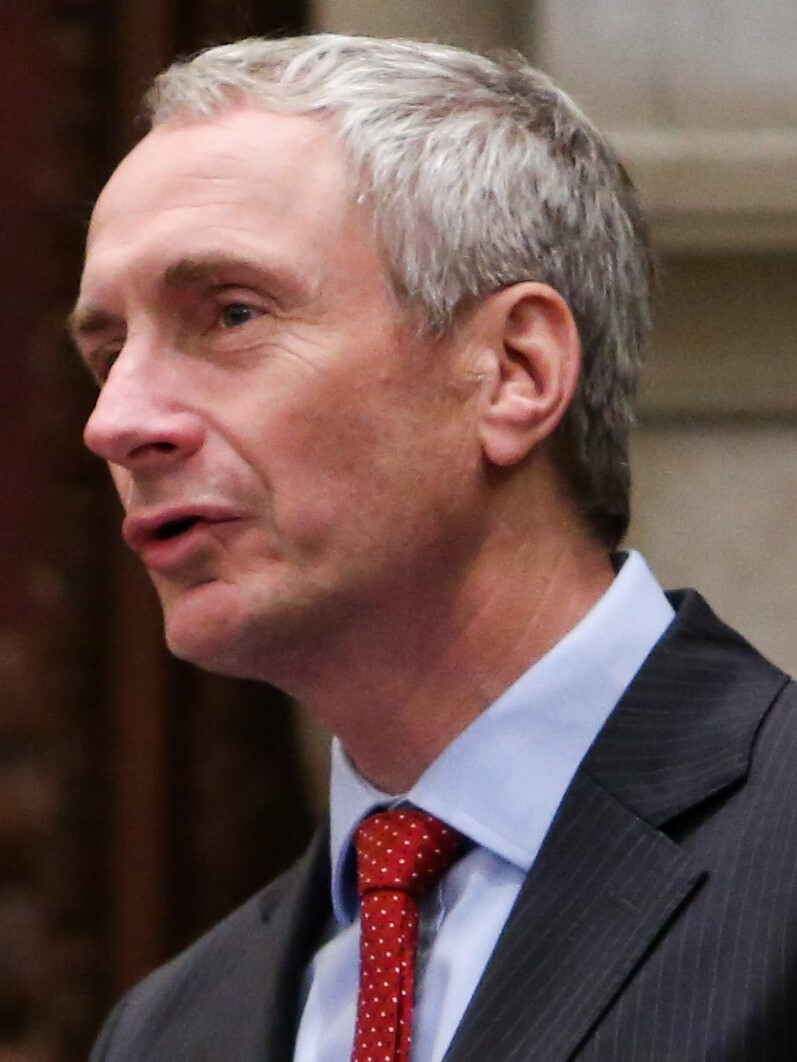

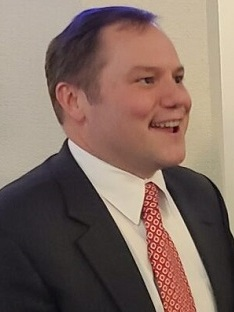
Nominee	Sean Ryan	James Gardner
Party	Democratic	Republican
Alliance	Working Families	Conservative
Popular vote	30,497	9,654
Percentage	71.78%	22.72%
Mayor before election
Christopher Scanlon (acting)
Democratic
Elected mayor
Sean Ryan
Democratic

The 2025 Buffalo mayoral election was held on November 4, 2025, to elect the mayor of Buffalo, New York.

Incumbent acting mayor Christopher Scanlon, who took office upon the resignation of Byron Brown, ran for a full term but was defeated in the Democratic primary by state senator Sean Ryan. The Republican Party nominated former county assistant district attorney James Gardner, who lost the election in a landslide.

== Democratic primary ==
2025 Buffalo Democratic mayoral primary
- June 24, 2025
- Turnout: 27% of registered Democrats
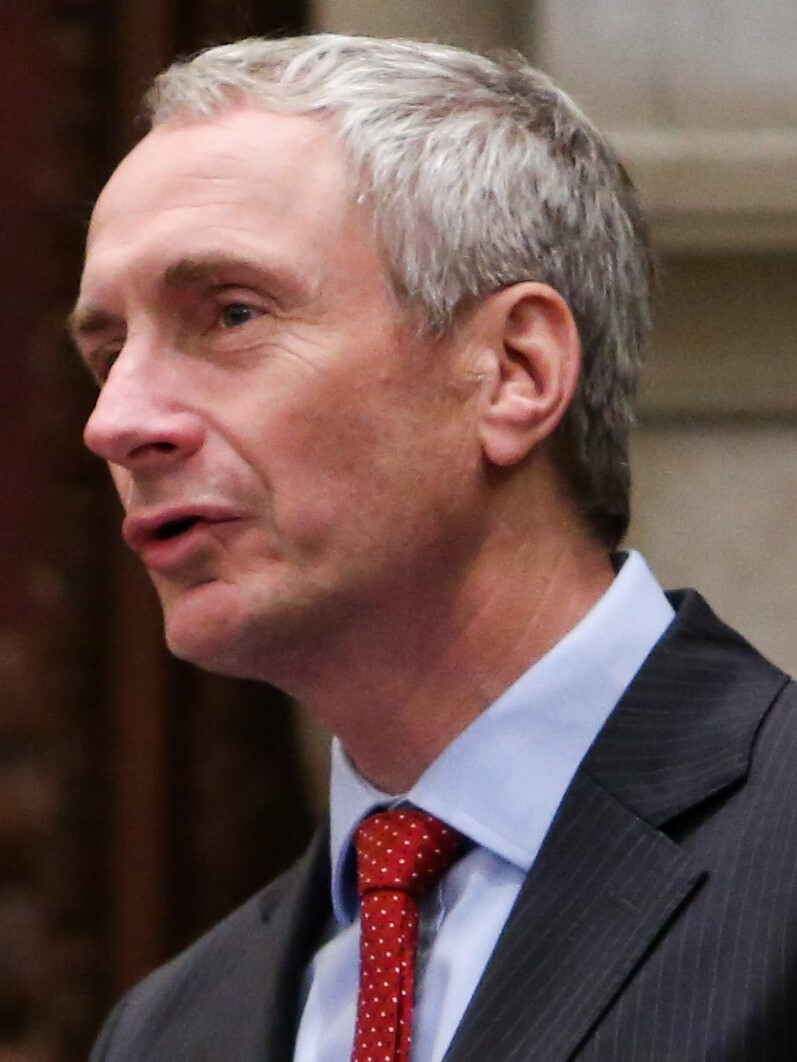

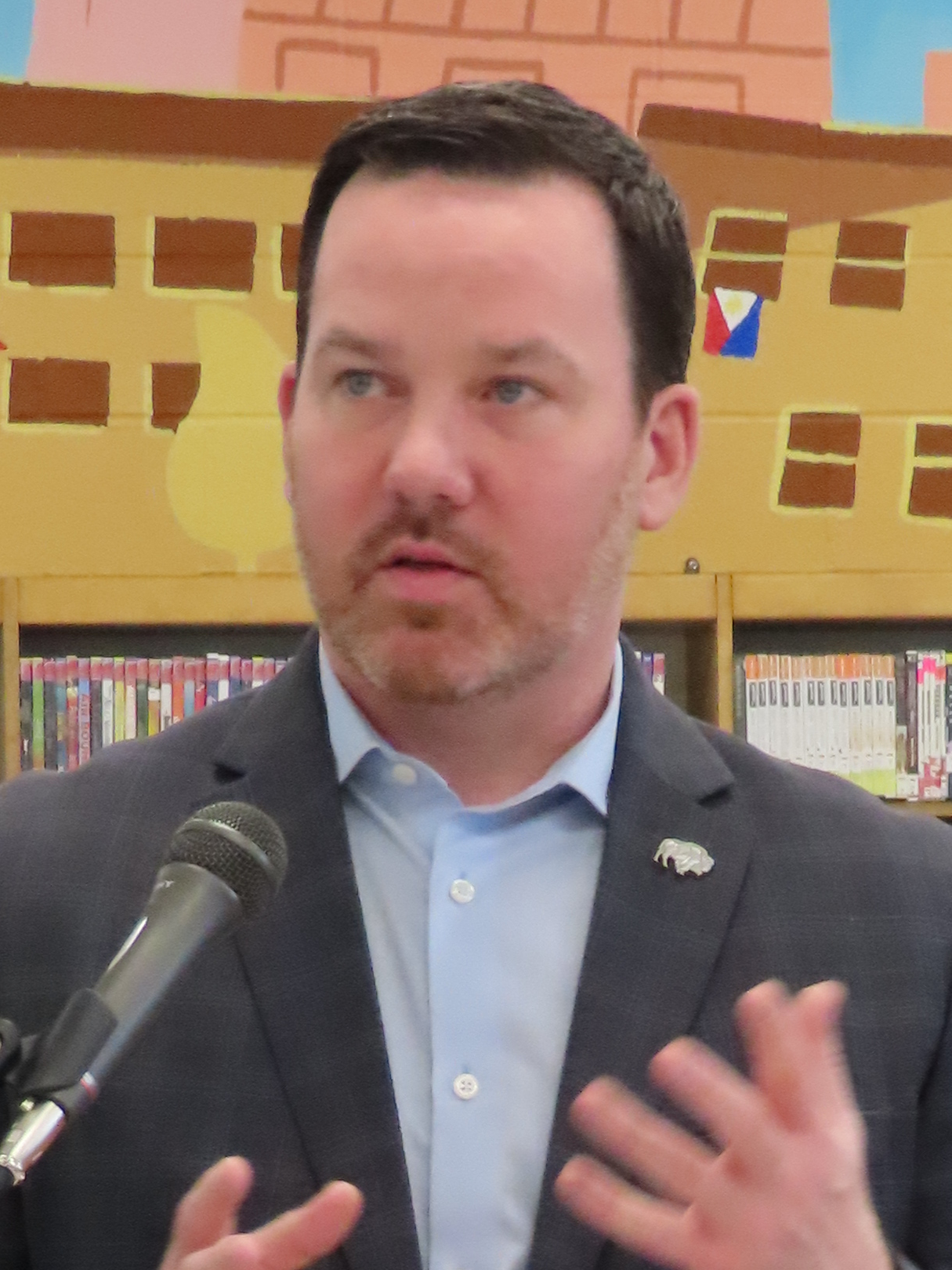

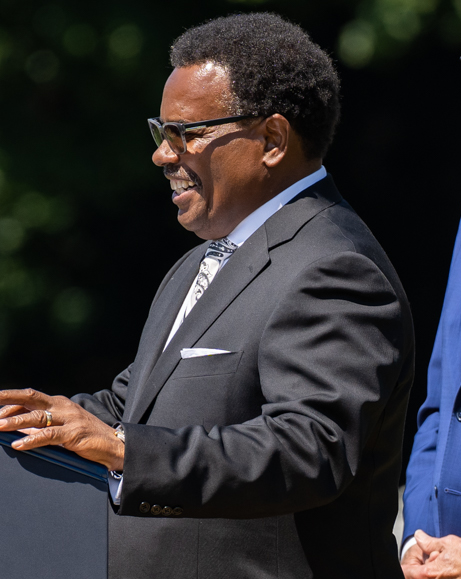

Candidate	Sean Ryan	Christopher Scanlon
Popular vote	12,439	9,430
Percentage	46.4%	35.2%
Candidate	Garnell Whitfield	Rasheed Wyatt
Popular vote	2,204	2,066
Percentage	8.2%	7.7%
- Results by Common Council district Ryan: 20–30% 30–40% 40–50% 50–60% 60–70% 70–80% Scanlon: 40–50% 50–60% 80–90%
Previous Democratic nominee
India Walton
Democratic nominee
Sean Ryan

In anticipation of mayor Byron Brown's resignation, South Buffalo councilman and fellow Democrat Christopher Scanlon was elected president of the Buffalo Common Council by a council vote on January 2, 2024. Scanlon had organized Brown's write-in campaign for the 2021 Buffalo mayoral election that won him a fifth term. Brown resigned to become chief executive officer of Western Regional Off-Track Betting on October 15, 2024, making Scanlon the acting mayor through right of succession to serve out his remaining term.

State senator Sean Ryan was endorsed by the Erie County Democratic Committee on February 22, 2025. The endorsement process faced criticism, as committee chairman Jeremy Zellner announced Ryan's endorsement several days before a vote was held among membership. Zellner denied rumors that he had pushed for Ryan's endorsement in exchange for being appointed to Ryan's state senate seat if he won mayorship. As both party chairman and self-appointed Erie County board of elections commissioner, Zellner has been accused of having a conflict of interest with regards to elections and nominating petitions. Four candidates alleged impropriety in the endorsement process: Buffalo ReUse founder Michael Gainer, acting mayor Christopher Scanlon, former Buffalo Fire commissioner Garnell Whitfield, and common councilor Rasheed Wyatt.

Michael Gainer was disqualified from the primary after Sean Ryan sued him in New York Supreme Court, successfully alleging that his nominating petition contained fraud. Gainer then petitioned to run as an independent candidate in the general election, and he appeared on the Restore Buffalo line. Christopher Scanlon also completed an independent petition for the general election. Garnell Whitfield's petition for an independent line was disqualified by the Erie County board of elections after a challenge by Scanlon's campaign.

Frontrunners Sean Ryan and Christopher Scanlon both launched attack ads against each other in the leadup to the primary. Ryan's ads accused Scanlon of accepting donations from Republican Carl Paladino, while Scanlon's ads accused Ryan of endorsing 2021 candidate India Walton and her platform to defund the police.

Sean Ryan won the Democratic primary on June 24, 2025. 27% of registered Democrats cast ballots, which was a higher voter turnout than the 2021 primary. 7,500 ballots were cast during the nine-day early voting period, up from 2,684 in 2021. Christopher Scanlon withdrew his independent bid following the primary and announced he would return to the Buffalo Common Council presidency, ensuring a new mayor would be decided in the general election.

=== Candidates ===
==== Nominee ====
Democratic candidates
Candidate	Experience	Announced	Ref
Sean Ryan	NY state senator for the 61st district (2021–present); NY assemblymember for the 149th district (2011–2021)	November 23, 2024; Website	

==== Eliminated in primary ====
- Christopher Scanlon, acting mayor
- Anthony Tyson-Thompson, former communications director for state assemblywoman Crystal Peoples-Stokes
- Garnell Whitfield, former Buffalo Fire commissioner
- Rasheed Wyatt, common councilor for the University district

==== Disqualified ====
- Michael Gainer, member of the Erie County Democratic Committee and founder of Buffalo ReUse (running as an independent)

==== Withdrawn ====
- Maggie Harter, community activist
- James McLeod, retired Buffalo City Court judge
- James Payne, community activist
- Terrence Robinson, community activist and Green nominee for mayor in 2017

==== Declined ====
- India Walton, community organizer and nominee for mayor in 2021

=== Endorsements ===
Sean Ryan

Party chapters

- Erie County Democratic Committee
- Western New York Working Families Party

State legislators

- April Baskin, SD-63
- Jonathan Rivera, AD-149

Local officials

- Betty Jean Grant, former county legislator for the 2nd district
- Mark Poloncarz, Erie County Executive

Organizations

- College Democrats of America
- College Democrats of New York
- Stonewall Democrats of Western New York

Labor unions

- ATU Local 1342
- AFSCME Council 66, Local 1095
- Buffalo Central Labor Council, AFL-CIO
- Buffalo Teachers Federation
- CWA District 1
- IATSE District 10
- IBEW 2104, Local 2199
- IUBAC Local 3
- IUEC Local 14
- IUOE Local 17
- IUPAT District 4
- New York State Nurses Association
- Police Benevolent Association of New York State Law Enforcement
- SMWIA Local 71
- UAW Region 9
- UBC Local 276
- UFCW Local One
- United Steelworkers District 4
- UA Plumbers & Steamfitters Local 22
- Workers United Rochester Regional Joint Board

Newspapers

- The Buffalo News
Christopher Scanlon

State legislators

- Crystal Peoples-Stokes, AD-141

Local officials

- John Bargnesi, county legislator for the 4th district
- John Gilmour, county legislator for the 9th district
- Carl Paladino, former Buffalo Public Schools board member (Republican)

Labor unions

- Buffalo Police Benevolent Association
- Buffalo Professional Firefighters Local 282
- CSEA Local 815, Local 1000, Region 6
- Erie County Sheriff's Police Benevolent Association
- IATSE Local 121
- International Brotherhood of Teamsters Local 264
- LIUNA Local 210
- Town of Tonawanda Police Club
- NFTA Police Department Benevolent Association
- Western New York Police Association
Declined to endorse

Statewide officials

- Kathy Hochul, Governor of New York

=== Debates ===
2025 Buffalo Democratic mayoral primary debates
No.	Date	Host	Moderator	Link	Participants				
Key: P Participant A Absent N Non-invitee I Invitee W Withdrawn									
Key: P Participant A Absent N Non-invitee I Invitee W Withdrawn					Ryan	Scanlon	Tyson- Thompson	Whitfield	Wyatt
1	June 3, 2025	WIVB-TV	Dave Greber; Marlee Tuskes	Video	P	P	P	P	P
2	June 17, 2025	WKBW-TV	Michael Wooten	Video	P	P	P	P	P

=== Forums ===
2025 Buffalo Democratic mayoral primary forums
No.	Date	Host	Moderator	Link	Participants						
Key: P Participant A Absent N Non-invitee I Invitee W Withdrawn											
Key: P Participant A Absent N Non-invitee I Invitee W Withdrawn					Gainer	Ryan	Scanlon	Tyson- Thompson	Whitfield	Wyatt	Other
1	December 5, 2024	ECDC	Jennifer Hibit	Audio	P	P	P	N	P	N	(Note: McLeod and Robinson participated.)
2	January 25, 2025	ECDC	Jennifer Hibit	Video	P	P	P	N	P	P	(Note: Harter, McLeod, and Payne participated.)
3	February 18, 2025	ECDC	Jeremy Zellner	Video	N	P	P	N	P	P	None
4	March 5, 2025	ESCP	Austin Martin; Sherry Sherrill	Video	P	P	P	N	P	P	(Note: Harter, Payne, and Robinson participated.)
5	May 12, 2025	LCV	Michael Wooten; Julie Tighe	Video	N	P	A	P	A	P	None
6	May 30, 2025	WUFO	Darius Pridgen; Marc Pope	Video	N	P	P	P	P	P	None
7	May 30, 2025	Casting Buffalo	Harry Lipsitz	Video	P	P	A	P	P	A	None
8	May 31, 2025	NYIC	Win Min Thant	Video	N	P	P	P	P	P	None
9	June 4, 2025	Good Food; Buffalo Coalition	Brenda McDuffie	Video	P	P	A	P	A	A	None
10	June 5, 2025	The Buffalo News	Deidre Williams; Elizabeth Licata; Justin Sondel	Video	N	P	P	P	P	P	None
11	June 12, 2025	WNYIL	Todd Vaarwerk	Video	N	P	P	P	P	P	None
12	June 13, 2025	BRRAlliance	Timothy Priano	Video	P	P	P	A	P	A	None

=== Fundraising ===
Campaign finance reports as of June 17, 2025
Candidate	Raised	Total funds	Spent	Est. Cash on hand
Sean Ryan	$583,626	$1,041,626	$975,007	$74,205
Christopher Scanlon	$664,668	$1,209,551	$857,397	$340,338
Anthony Tyson-Thompson	$3,380	$3,380	$0	$3,380
Garnell Whitfield	$45,240	$76,042	$70,153	$5,488
Rasheed Wyatt	$31,437	$44,132	$17,898	$24,861
Source: The Buffalo News

=== Results ===
2025 Buffalo Democratic mayoral primary
Party	Candidate	Votes	%
Democratic	Sean Ryan	12,439	46.4%
Democratic	Christopher Scanlon (incumbent)	9,430	35.2%
Democratic	Garnell Whitfield	2,204	8.2%
Democratic	Rasheed Wyatt	2,066	7.7%
Democratic	Anthony Tyson-Thompson	642	2.4%
Total votes		26,781	100%

== Republican nomination ==
James Gardner was initially reported as being a placeholder candidate who would later give up his ballot line after the party nominated him to a judgeship in Yonkers. He denied those claims and declared his intention to compete in the general election. Erie County clerk Michael Kearns had reportedly offered to replace Gardner on the ballot.

=== Candidates ===
==== Nominee ====
Republican candidates
Candidate	Experience	Announced	Ref
James Gardner	Erie County assistant district attorney (2010–2017); Nominee for Erie County district attorney in 2024	February 27, 2025; Website	

==== Declined ====
- Christopher Scanlon, acting mayor (Democratic)

=== Endorsements ===
James Gardner

Party chapters

- Erie County Republican Committee

== Working Families nomination ==
The Working Families Party clarified that their nomination of Sean Ryan was contingent on him winning the Democratic primary. They reserved the right to rescind their nomination should he have been defeated, as the party historically does not endorse spoiler candidates. Ryan also said he would have withdrawn from the mayoral race if he lost the Democratic primary.

=== Candidates ===
==== Nominee ====
- Sean Ryan, state senator for the 61st district (Democratic)

=== Endorsements ===
Sean Ryan

Party chapters

- Working Families Party of New York

== Conservative nomination ==
James Gardner has worked as a civil attorney for the law firm of Erie County Conservative Party chairman Ralph Lorigo since January 2025.

=== Candidates ===
==== Nominee ====
- James Gardner, former Erie County assistant district attorney (Republican)

==== Declined ====
- Christopher Scanlon, acting mayor (Democratic)

=== Endorsements ===
James Gardner

Party chapters

- Erie County Conservative Party

== Independent candidates ==
Michael Gainer and Christopher Scanlon filed independent petitions to run in the general election under new party lines, ensuring they would be able to continue their campaigns even if they failed to secure the Democratic nomination. Garnell Whitfield's independent petition was disqualified by the Erie County board of elections after a challenge by Scanlon's campaign. Scanlon announced that he was withdrawing his independent candidacy and would instead return to serving as Buffalo Common Council president.

=== Candidates ===
==== Declared ====
- Michael Gainer, Erie County Democratic Committee member (2024–present) and founder of Buffalo ReUse

==== Disqualified ====
- Garnell Whitfield, former Buffalo Fire commissioner (Democratic)

==== Withdrawn ====
- Ryan Caughill, emergency preparedness consultant (endorsed Whitfield)
- Christopher Scanlon, acting mayor (Democratic)

==== Declined ====
- Sean Ryan, state senator for the 61st district
- Rasheed Wyatt, common councilor for the University district

== General election ==
=== Campaign ===
Republican nominee James Gardner staged a press conference to launch his general election campaign on July 9, 2025. He likened Ryan to New York City mayoral nominee Zohran Mamdani, claiming that Ryan is a supporter of socialism. Both Ryan and Mamdani were endorsed by the Working Families Party, which Gardner described as "extremist". Ryan dismissed Gardner's claims, with Erie County Democratic Committee chair Jeremy Zellner saying he was "confident" Ryan would be victorious in the November election.

Ryan led the general election candidates in fundraising, with his top donors including developers Michael Chapman and Sam Savarino, former mayor Anthony Masiello, city contractor Alternative Information Systems, and electronic cigarette mogul Alex Alarshi. A $1,500 donation by former mayor Byron Brown was refused by Ryan's campaign, but Ryan did accept a $5,000 donation from Magellan Technologies, an electronic cigarette distributor under federal investigation. Gardner's campaign was primarily self-funded, with his top donors including Buffalo Police officer Adam Wigdorski, the Buffalo Police Benevolent Association, former congressman Chris Jacobs, and former parking commissioner Kevin Helfer. Gainer's campaign was also largely self-funded, with outside donations coming from Jacobs, developer Bill Breeser, and attorney Adam Walters.

The election took place on November 4th, 2025. The Associated Press called the race for Sean Ryan at 10:14 p.m. EST that night. In total, 42,488 votes were cast and counted, including 30,497 votes (71.78%) for Sean Ryan, 9,654 votes (22.72%) for James Gardner, 1,966 votes (4.63%) for Michael Gainer, and 371 write-in votes.

As Ryan won the mayorship, a February 2026 special election was held for his state senate seat. State assemblyman Jonathan Rivera declared his candidacy for Ryan's state senate seat on October 9, 2025. Jeremy Zellner challenged Rivera for the state senate seat, and he criticized Rivera for announcing his candidacy prior to the mayoral election. Erie County Republican Committee chairman Michael Kracker also condemned Rivera's announcement, describing it as disrespectful to city voters. Zellner won the special election.

=== Forums ===
2025 Buffalo mayoral general election forums
No.	Date	Host	Moderator	Link	Participants		
Key: P Participant A Absent N Non-invitee I Invitee W Withdrawn							
Key: P Participant A Absent N Non-invitee I Invitee W Withdrawn					Gainer	Gardner	Ryan
1	September 25, 2025	Allentown Association	Justin Sondel	Video	P	P	P
2	October 9, 2025	Alpha Kappa Alpha			P	P	A

=== Debates ===
2025 Buffalo mayoral general election debates
No.	Date	Host	Moderator	Link	Participants		
Key: P Participant A Absent N Non-invitee I Invitee W Withdrawn							
Key: P Participant A Absent N Non-invitee I Invitee W Withdrawn					Gainer	Gardner	Ryan
1	October 23, 2025	St. Joseph's Collegiate Institute	Ted Lina		P	P	P

=== Fundraising ===
Campaign finance reports as of October 3, 2025
Candidate	Raised	Total funds	Spent	Est. Cash on hand
Michael Gainer	$2,752	$5,752	$6,847	$0
James Gardner	$10,888	$118,097	$114,580	$3,516
Sean Ryan	$183,306	$213,306	$146,584	$66,200
Source: Investigative Post

=== Results ===
2025 Buffalo mayoral election
Party	Candidate	Votes	%
Democratic	Sean Ryan	26,725	62.90%
Working Families	Sean Ryan	3,772	8.88%
Total	Sean Ryan	30,497	71.78%
Republican	James Gardner	7,967	18.75%
Conservative	James Gardner	1,687	3.97%
Total	James Gardner	9,654	22.72%
Restore Buffalo	Michael Gainer (Note: Michael Gainer is a registered Democrat, but is running an independent mayoral campaign following his disqualification from the Democratic primary.)	1,966	4.63%
Write-in		371	0.87%
Total votes		42,488	100%
