= Sean Ryan (American politician) =

American politician (born 1965)

- Ryan in 2022

64th Mayor of Buffalo
- Incumbent
- Assumed office January 1, 2026
- Preceded by: Christopher Scanlon (acting)

Member of the New York State Senate
- In office January 1, 2021 – December 31, 2025
- Preceded by: Joseph Giglio
- Succeeded by: Jeremy Zellner
- Constituency: 60th district (2021–2023); 61st district (2023–2025)

Member of the New York State Assembly
- In office September 24, 2011 – December 31, 2020
- Preceded by: Sam Hoyt
- Succeeded by: Jonathan Rivera
- Constituency: 144th district (2011–2013); 149th district (2013–2020)

Personal details
- Born: March 4, 1965 (age 61) Lackawanna, New York, U.S.
- Party: Democratic
- Spouse: Catherine Creighton
- Education: State University of New York, Fredonia (BA); Brooklyn Law School (JD)
- Website: Campaign website Office website

Sean M. Ryan (born March 4, 1965) is an American attorney and politician who is currently serving as the mayor of Buffalo. He previously served in New York State Senate representing the 61st district and 60th district from 2021 to 2025, and in the New York State Assembly from 2011 to 2020 in both the 144th district and the 149th district.

== Early life and education ==
Sean Ryan was born to James W. Ryan, , and Patricia Ryan (née McQuillen), an educator and member of the Erie County Democratic Committee.

Ryan earned a Bachelor of Arts degree from the State University of New York at Fredonia and a Juris Doctor from Brooklyn Law School. He was then admitted the New York State Bar Association.

== Career ==
As an attorney, Ryan specialized in anti-discrimination and labor law cases.

On September 13, 2011, Ryan was elected during a special election to the New York State Assembly, succeeding longtime assemblyman Sam Hoyt. His mother Patricia and sister Kerry were both members of the Erie County Democratic Committee, and were credited with running his campaign and assisting his victory.

In 2012, he was elected to the 149th district. He was supported by the 1199SEIU United Healthcare Workers East.

In 2020, he was elected to New York's 60th senate district. Due to redistricting following the 2020 U.S. census, Ryan successfully ran in the newly-drawn 61st senate district in the 2022 election. As a member of the State Senate, Ryan championed legislation to prohibit non-compete clauses in New York, which passed both houses of the state legislature in 2023.

== Mayor of Buffalo ==
On November 23, 2024, Ryan announced his candidacy for the 2025 Buffalo mayoral election, where he challenged incumbent mayor Christopher Scanlon for the position. On February 22, 2025, the Erie County Democratic Committee endorsed Ryan in the Democratic primary, which he won on June 24, 2025. On November 4, 2025, Ryan would be elected mayor of Buffalo after defeating two other candidates, Republican James Gardner and independent Michael Gainer.

== Personal life ==
Ryan is married to Catherine Creighton, an attorney who has served as director of the Erie County Fiscal Stability Authority since her appointment by governor Andrew Cuomo in 2012. Creighton has also been director of Cornell University's ILR Buffalo Co-Lab since 2020.

They have two daughters.

== Electoral history ==
2025 Buffalo mayoral election
Party	Candidate	Votes	%
Democratic	Sean Ryan	30,497	72.4
Republican	James Gardner	9,654	22.9
Independent	Michael Gainer	1,966	4.7
Total votes		42,117	100.0
Democratic hold			

2024 New York State Senate election, District 61
Party	Candidate	Votes	%
Democratic	Sean Ryan	80,274	
Working Families	Sean Ryan	8,146	
Total	Sean Ryan (incumbent)	88,420	61.7
Republican	Christine Czarnik	46,343	
Conservative	Christine Czarnik	8,323	
Total	Christine Czarnik	54,666	38.2
Write-in		160	0.1
Total votes		143,246	100.0
Democratic hold			

2022 New York's 61st State Senate district election
Party	Candidate	Votes	%
Democratic	Sean Ryan	57,616	
Working Families	Sean Ryan	6,285	
Total	Sean Ryan (incumbent)	63,901	56.6
Republican	Edward Rath III	39,305	
Conservative	Edward Rath III	9,500	
Total	Edward Rath III (incumbent)	48,805	43.3
Write-in		90	0.1
Total votes		112,796	100.0
Democratic win (new boundaries)			

2020 New York's 60th State Senate district election
Party	Candidate	Votes	%
Democratic	Sean Ryan	79,396	52.98
Working Families	Sean Ryan	9,182	6.13
Independence	Sean Ryan	2,452	1.64
Total	Sean Ryan	91,030	60.75
Republican	Joshua Mertzlufft	49,649	33.13
Conservative	Joshua Mertzlufft	9,174	6.12
Total	Joshua Mertzlufft	58,823	39.25
Total valid votes		149,853	95.77
Rejected ballots		6,625	4.23
Total votes		156,478	100.00
Democratic gain from Republican			

New York State Assembly 149th district election, 2018
Party	Candidate	Votes	%
Democratic	Sean Ryan (incumbent)	31,233	72.1
Republican	Joseph Totaro	12,062	27.9
Total votes		43,295	100.0
Democratic hold			

== Notes ==
Political offices
Preceded by Christopher Scanlon; Acting	Mayor of Buffalo; 2026–present	Incumbent
