= Garnell Whitfield =

American politician

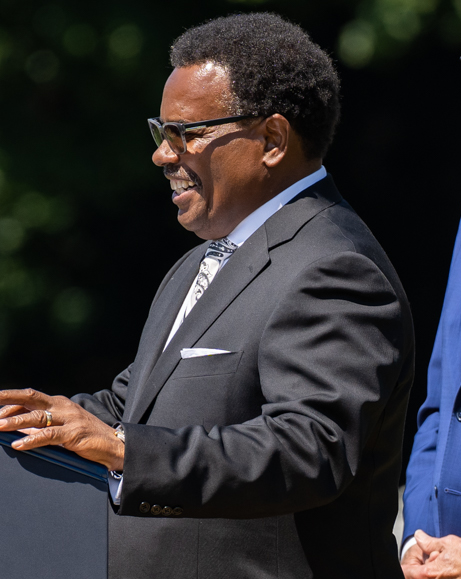
- Whitfield in 2022

Assistant Commissioner of the New York State Division of Homeland Security and Emergency Services
- In office September 2017 – September 2019
- Governor: Andrew Cuomo

Commissioner of the Buffalo Fire Department
- In office January 2010 – July 2017
- Preceded by: Michael Lombardo
- Succeeded by: Vincent V. Muscarella

Personal details
- Born: Garnell W. Whitfield Jr. April 1957 (age 69) Buffalo, New York, U.S.
- Party: Democratic
- Spouse: Cassieta
- Children: 4
- Occupation: Firefighter, Politician
- Website: Official website

Garnell W. Whitfield Jr. is the former fire commissioner of the Buffalo Fire Department in Buffalo, New York and a social justice advocate. He received national attention for spreading awareness of white supremacy and domestic terrorism after his mother, Ruth Whitfield, was killed in the 2022 Buffalo shooting.

He ran in the Democratic primary for the 2025 Buffalo mayoral election.

== Early life and career ==
Whitfield was born April 1957 in Buffalo, New York to Ruth Whitfield and Garnell W. Whitfield, Sr.

He started working as a firefighter in the Buffalo Fire Department in 1984. Throughout his career, he served as the city fire departments's chief fire administrator, deputy commissioner of administration and deputy commissioner of emergency services.

In January 2010, Mayor of Buffalo Byron Brown appointed Whitfield as the commissioner of the Buffalo Fire Department after the resignation of commissioner Michael Lombardo. He was unanimously approved by the Buffalo Common Council.

In March 2016, Buffalo firefighters issued a vote of no confidence in Whitfield. He then retired from the Buffalo Fire Department in 2017. Governor Andrew Cuomo appointed Whitfield as the assistant commissioner of the New York State Division of Homeland Security and Emergency Services, where he served from September 2017 until September 2019.

== 2022 Buffalo shooting ==
His mother, Ruth Whitfield, was the oldest victim of the 2022 Buffalo shooting that occurred at a Tops Friendly Markets supermarket in the East Side neighborhood of Buffalo. He said he had been calling his mother and trying to locate her, until he found her car in the parking lot of the Tops Supermarket where the shooting occurred.

She was 86 years old when the shooting occurred. Her funeral was attended by Vice President Kamala Harris and her husband, Douglas Emhoff. The Vice President met with Whitfield before his mother's funeral service.

In an effort to raise awareness of white supremacy and domestic terrorism in the United States, Whitfield testified in the United States Senate Judiciary Committee.

Whitfield appeared on news outlets after the shooting alongside prominent civil rights attorney Benjamin Crump, who he retained for legal counsel in the wake of shooting.

In June 2022, Whitfield was featured as a speaker at the March for Our Lives protest held in Washington, D.C.

== Mayoral candidacy ==
Whitfield announced his candidacy for the 2025 Buffalo mayoral election in December 2024. He dropped out of the race after losing the Democratic primary, and failing to secure an independent line for the general election.

== Personal life ==
Whitfield is married to his wife, Cassieta. They live in the East Side neighborhood of Buffalo.

He is a Catholic Christian.
