= 2022 Buffalo shooting =

Mass shooting in New York, U.S.

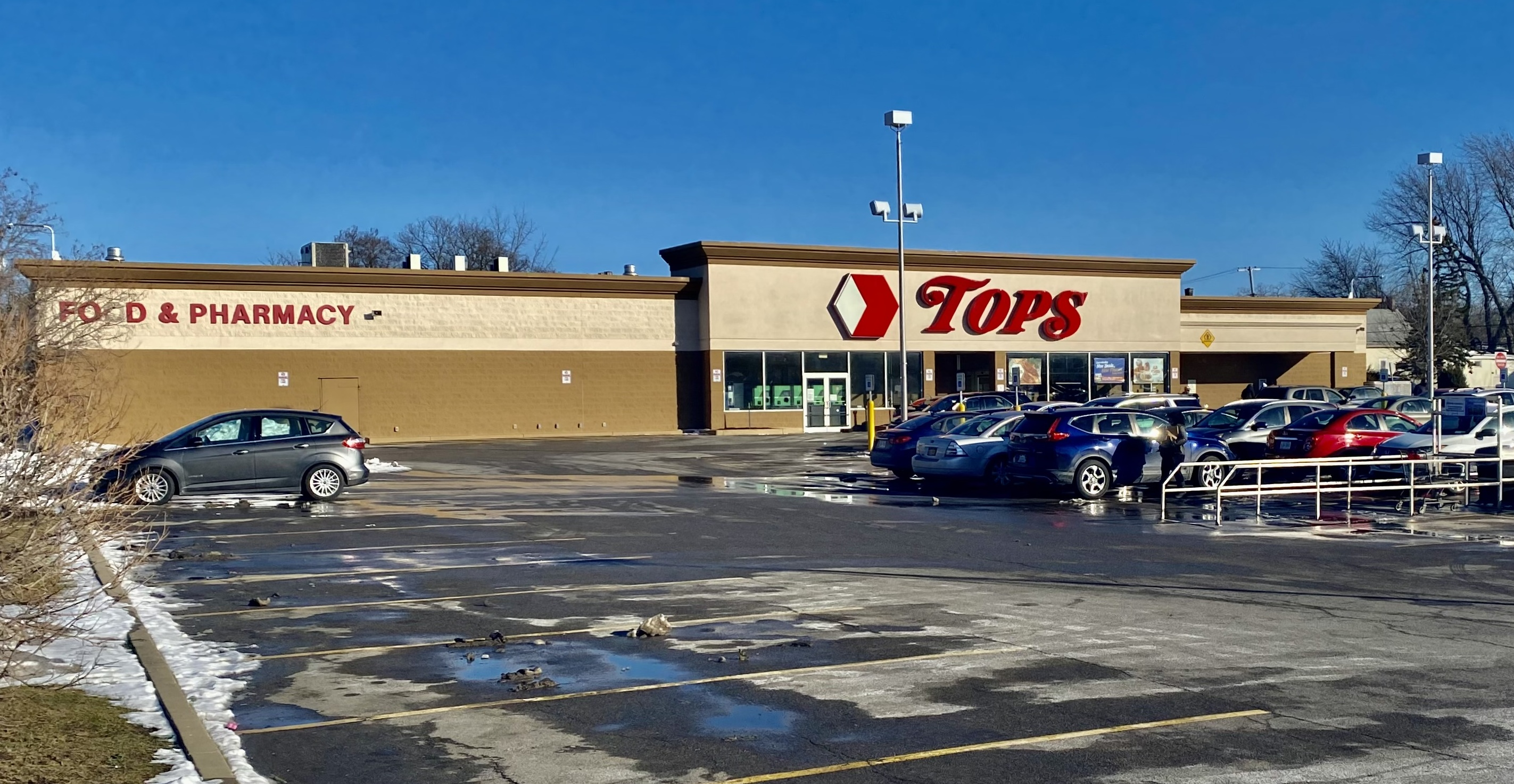
- The Tops supermarket in February 2022
- Location: 42.909722°N 78.852778°W; 1275 Jefferson Avenue, Buffalo, New York, U.S.
- Date: May 14, 2022; 4 years ago c. 2:30 p.m. – 2:36 p.m. (EDT; UTC−04:00)
- Target: African Americans
- Attack type: Mass shooting; mass murder; domestic terrorism; right-wing terrorism; hate crime; shootout
- Weapons: .223 Bushmaster XM-15 AR-15-style semi-automatic rifle; .30-06 Savage Axis XP bolt-action rifle (unused, left in car); 12-gauge Mossberg 500 pump-action shotgun (unused, left in car)
- Deaths: 10
- Injuries: 3
- Perpetrator: Payton Gendron
- Defenders: Lieutenant Aaron Salter Jr.; Carlton Steverson; Multiple other employees
- Motive: Anti-black racism; White supremacy; Belief in the Great Replacement and white genocide conspiracy theories; Accelerationist neo-Nazism
- Charges: 27 counts (Note: Federal: Hate Crime Resulting in Death (10 counts); Discharge of a Firearm to Commit Murder (10 counts); Hate Crime Act Involving An Attempt to Kill (3 counts); Use and Discharge of a Firearm During and in Relation to a Crime of Violence (3 counts); Hate Crime Act Involving an Attempt to Kill)
- Verdict: State: Pleaded guilty
- Convictions: 25 counts (Note: State: Domestic act of terrorism motivated by hate; First-degree murder (10 counts); Second-degree murder as a hate crime (10 counts); Attempted first-degree murder (3 counts); Second-degree criminal possession of a weapon)
- Sentence: State: Eleven consecutive life sentences without the possibility of parole plus 90 years

On May 14, 2022, a mass shooting occurred in Buffalo, New York, United States, at a Tops Friendly Markets supermarket in the East Side neighborhood. Ten people, all of whom were black, were murdered, and three people were injured. The perpetrator, 18-year-old Payton Gendron, livestreamed part of the attack on Twitch until the livestream was shut down by the service in under two minutes.

Gendron was inspired to carry out the attack after learning about numerous white supremacist mass murderers through 4chan during isolation caused by the COVID-19 pandemic. His main inspiration was the perpetrator of the Christchurch mosque shootings, who also livestreamed his attack online. After reading the shooter's manifesto, Gendron came to believe that his "sole purpose in life" was to commit a similar attack to prevent an "uprising" against white people. He was taken into custody and charged with over 25 counts, including first-degree murder and terrorism. He pled not guilty to all of the charges on May 19.

On November 28, 2022, Gendron pleaded guilty to all state charges in the shooting, including murder, domestic terrorism, and hate crimes in an attempt to avoid the death penalty. On February 15, 2023, Gendron was sentenced to 11 concurrent life sentences without the possibility of parole. His federal trial began on October 13, 2026, and the federal prosecution has expressed their intention to seek the death penalty.

Gendron wrote a manifesto describing himself as an ethno-nationalist and a supporter of white supremacy who was motivated to commit acts of political violence. He voiced support for the Great Replacement conspiracy theory in the context of a white genocide. The attack has been described as an act of domestic terrorism, and it is also being investigated as a hate crime which was motivated by racism. Governor Kathy Hochul promised policy changes in the state as a result of the attack while condemning the shooter; shortly afterwards, the state of New York banned most semi-automatic sales to people under 21 and certain types of body armor. On March 19, 2024, a New York state judge ruled Reddit and YouTube must face lawsuits in connection with the mass shooting over accusations that they played a role in the radicalization of the shooter.

== Shooting ==
At around 2:30 p.m. EDT (UTC−04:00), Gendron arrived at the Tops supermarket on Jefferson Avenue, in a predominantly black neighborhood in Buffalo, New York. He was armed with a Bushmaster XM-15 AR-15–style rifle, illegally modified to accept high-capacity magazines, and had multiple 30-round magazines. In his car, he had a Savage Arms Axis XP hunting rifle and a Mossberg 500 shotgun. He was wearing body armor, a military helmet, and a recording camera attached to his helmet through which he livestreamed the attack on the online service Twitch. As he approached the grocery store entrance, he said "Just got to go for it." Towards the end of the stream, Gendron aimed his rifle at an injured white person, the store manager, hiding behind a checkout counter but he apologized and did not shoot.

Gendron first shot four people in the parking lot, murdering three. He then entered the store, shooting eight more people and killing six. At 2:31 p.m., Buffalo police received a call reporting shots fired at the store. The first responding officers and firefighters arrived a minute later and reported bodies lying outside the building. At 2:34 p.m., a dispatcher started informing responding officers of an active shooter situation at the store.

According to a law enforcement source, Gendron yelled racial slurs during the incident. Many employees and customers used the store's break room to hide from Gendron and barricaded the door with a heavy desk. Other customers were hidden by employees in the milk cooler and said Gendron shot through the coolers, but the milk cartons stopped the bullets. At some point, an armed security guard, former Buffalo Police Department officer Aaron Salter Jr., shot at him. Due to Gendron's body armor, Salter's bullet did not stop him. Gendron returned fire at Salter, who died at the scene.

During the shooting, Carlton Steverson, a deli clerk at that time, and another colleague assisted several other employees and customers, as Steverson said to them to go to the bakery section and put them in the freezer to hide in safety, which among the group included a woman with a sister that was shot, two young girls and a man carrying a baby. As they hid there for a minute, Steverson said that gunfire was getting closer and considered that they may risk being caught if they stayed in the cooler for longer. He opened a door inside and immediately lead people to the rear emergency exit, and after helping them then ran out together with his co-worker. Steverson called his manager, who was just arriving at the store, and urged her not to come inside because there was an active shooter.

By 2:36 p.m., Gendron had gone to the front of the building, where patrol officers were able to talk him into dropping his gun after he reportedly aimed it at his neck. Here, Gendron was stripped of his body armor and arrested in front of the store as onlookers watched. A total of 60 shots were fired during the shooting. After his arrest, Gendron made statements regarding his motive and state of mind.

== Victims ==
Thirteen people—eleven of them black and two white—were shot, ten fatally. One of them, 55-year-old Aaron Salter Jr., was a former Buffalo Police lieutenant who was working as a security guard when he confronted Gendron. In addition to Salter, the people fatally shot were Celestine Chaney, 65; Roberta A. Drury, 32; Andre Mackneil, 53; Katherine Massey, 72; Margus D. Morrison, 52; Heyward Patterson, 67; Geraldine Talley, 62; Ruth Whitfield, 86; and Pearl Young, 77.

Four victims were employees of the store, including Salter; the other three survived. All ten who died were black.

== Immediate aftermath ==
Dozens of residents held a vigil at the supermarket the day after the shooting. True Bethel Baptist Church held a mourning service nearby, which was attended by families of the victims and some of those who survived the attack. A moment of silence was held at game one of the 2022 National Lacrosse League playoffs eastern semifinals being held in Buffalo, between the Toronto Rock and Buffalo Bandits, and the proceeds of the 50/50 raffle were donated to the victims' families. Bandits head coach John Tavares told the media after his team's victory that the athletes played "definitely with a heavy heart" given the circumstances. A charity softball game at Sahlen Field featuring members of the Buffalo Bills held a moment of silence prior to the event and donated a portion of the proceeds to victims' families. The Buffalo Bisons added a black decal with the date of the tragedy to the back of their batting helmets to honor the victims of the tragedy for the remainder of the season. The Toronto Blue Jays, the Bisons' Major League parent team, also held a moment of silence prior to their game against the Seattle Mariners on May 16.

The Tops' closure after the shooting slowed food access in the East Side, where it was the only supermarket since it opened in 2003. Organizations inside and outside the community started programs to fill its absence, distributing and delivering food and clothing to residents. Tops provided free shuttle service to another location and pledged to send refrigerated food trucks daily. The company later stated that it would reopen the store on July 15, with a memorial honoring the victims.

== Investigation ==
Erie County Sheriff John Garcia said the shooting was a "straight up racially motivated hate crime from somebody outside of our community". Stephen Belongia, the head of the local FBI office, told reporters that the agency was investigating the shooting as both a hate crime and an act of racially motivated violent extremism. Police arrested Gendron and transported him to Buffalo Police Headquarters, with police reporting him to be in custody by about 2:36 p.m. Gendron's parents were interviewed by federal agents.

According to the Buffalo police commissioner, they uncovered information that if he escaped the supermarket, he had plans to continue his attack. The county's district attorney said he had evidence that Gendron was motivated by racial animosity. According to law enforcement sources who spoke to The Buffalo News, they were investigating Gendron's alleged contact with a number of people online, including a retired federal agent, and whether these individuals had thirty minutes of advance notice of the attack yet did not notify the authorities.

A separate investigation into the conduct of a 911 operator during the shooting began on May 15. An assistant manager at the Tops store reportedly called 911 and spoke to the dispatcher in a whisper, in order to avoid detection by Gendron. The employee was then reportedly shouted at by the dispatcher, who wondered aloud why the woman was whispering and then allegedly hung up on her. The Office of the Erie County Executive announced the dispatcher was placed on administrative leave and was then fired after a disciplinary hearing.

== Perpetrator ==
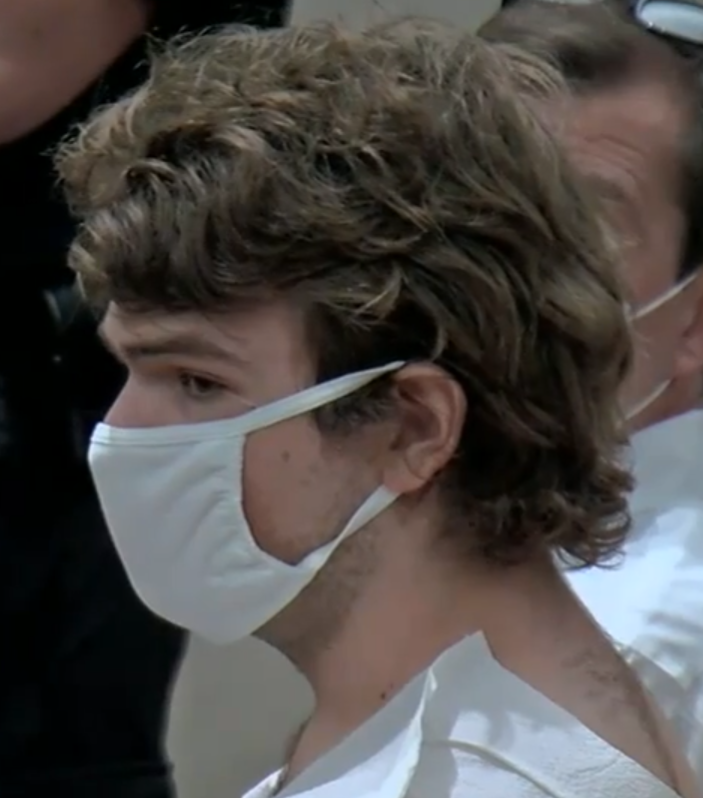
Gendron following his initial arrest on May 14, 2022

Payton Spencer Gendron (born June 20, 2003) is a White man who, at the time of the shooting, was an 18-year-old college student. He had traveled three and a half hours to the supermarket from his hometown of Conklin, New York, about 200 miles (320 km) away. The police said that Gendron had been in Buffalo in early March and was also there the day before the shooting, having carried out reconnaissance at the Tops supermarket. According to police, he had researched previous hate-motivated attacks and shootings.

In June 2021, Gendron had been investigated by the police in Broome County for making a "generalized threat" or "a threatening statement" at his high school. Gendron told police that he was joking, but he later wrote online that this was a bluff. He was not charged in connection with the incident since, according to investigators, he had not made a specific enough threat to warrant further action. The New York State Police did not seek an order from a state court to remove guns from Gendron's possession. He underwent a mental health evaluation, but it was not an involuntary commitment, which would have prohibited him from buying guns under federal law.

The weapon Gendron used in the shooting was a Bushmaster XM-15 AR-15–style rifle. During the purchase, the seller said that Gendron passed the background check and that the seller did not remember Gendron. Since New York state prohibits the purchase and possession of magazines capable of holding more than ten rounds of ammunition, Gendron traveled to Pennsylvania from his home in New York state to purchase a 30-round ammunition magazine. Before the shooting, Gendron wrote that he had purchased a rifle and illegally modified it in order for it to accept 30-round magazines.

Prior to the shooting, Gendron wrote and released online a 180-page manifesto that primarily references the topic of mass immigration. In it, he describes himself as holding white supremacist, anti-Semitic, populist, and ecofascist views. The manifesto primarily promotes the white nationalist and far-right Great Replacement conspiracy theory of Renaud Camus, which claims that elites are promoting immigration and decreasing white birth rates in an attempt to subject whites to a genocide. The manifesto also says that Jews and societal elites are responsible for transgender inclusivity and non-white immigration, that black people disproportionately kill white people, and that non-whites will overwhelm and wipe out the white race. Gendron also expressed support for far-right mass shooters Dylann Roof, Anders Behring Breivik, and Brenton Tarrant.

=== Legal proceedings ===
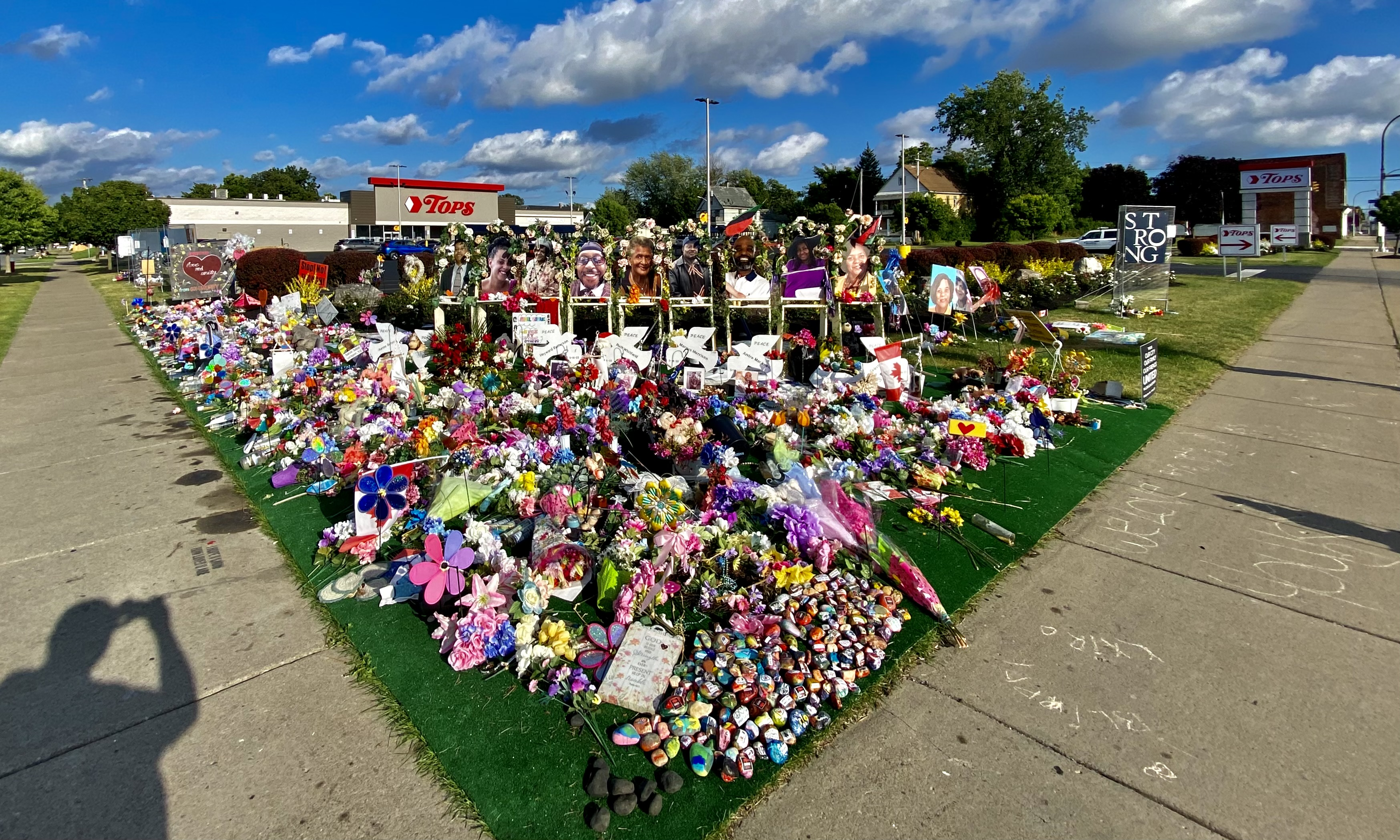
Memorial for the victims of the shooting outside of the supermarket

Gendron was arraigned in Buffalo City Court, a New York State Court. Represented by a public defender, Gendron entered a not guilty plea to multiple charges of first-degree murder. He was held without bail under suicide watch. On the same day, the Attorney General of the United States, Merrick Garland, confirmed that the United States Department of Justice was investigating the shooting as a hate crime and as an act of racially motivated violent extremism. On June 1, a grand jury issued a 25-count indictment against Gendron. He was charged with "one count of domestic terrorism motivated by hate", as well as "10 counts of first-degree murder as a hate crime, 10 counts of second-degree murder as a hate crime, three counts of attempted second-degree murder as a hate crime and one count of second-degree criminal possession of a weapon", according to The Washington Post. Gendron was arraigned in Erie County Court on June 2, 2022, and pled not guilty to all 25 charges.

On November 28, Gendron pled guilty to fifteen state-level counts: ten counts of first-degree murder, three counts of attempted murder motivated by hate, criminal weapons possession, and domestic terrorism motivated by hate. On February 15, 2023, Gendron was denied youthful offender status and received 11 life sentences without the possibility of parole plus 90 years. During his sentencing hearing, Gendron gave a statement, saying:

"I'm very sorry for all the pain I forced the victims and their families to suffer through. I'm very sorry for stealing the lives of your loved ones. I can not express how much I regret all of the decisions I made leading up to my actions on May 14. I did a terrible thing that day. I shot and killed people because they were black. Looking back now, I can't believe I actually did it. I believed what I read online and acted out of hate. I know I can't take it back, but I wish I could. And, I don't want anyone to be inspired by me and what I did."

Despite his guilty plea, prosecutors announced that Gendron was still facing federal charges. In December 2022, Gendron's lawyer indicated that he would be willing to plead guilty to the federal charges to avoid the death penalty. On January 12, 2024, the Department of Justice said that it would seek the death penalty, making this the first death penalty case under Garland, who had in the past expressed his opposition to capital punishment. In explaining their reasons to seek the death penalty, the prosecutors stated that Gendron's decision to select the supermarket showed he planned to "maximize the number of Black victims", his beliefs in white supremacy, and the substantial planning and premeditation behind the crime, were among the factors they considered in seeking capital punishment for Gendron. Jury selection in Gendron's trial began on October 13, 2026; originally scheduled for August 17, 2026.

== Reactions ==
=== National ===
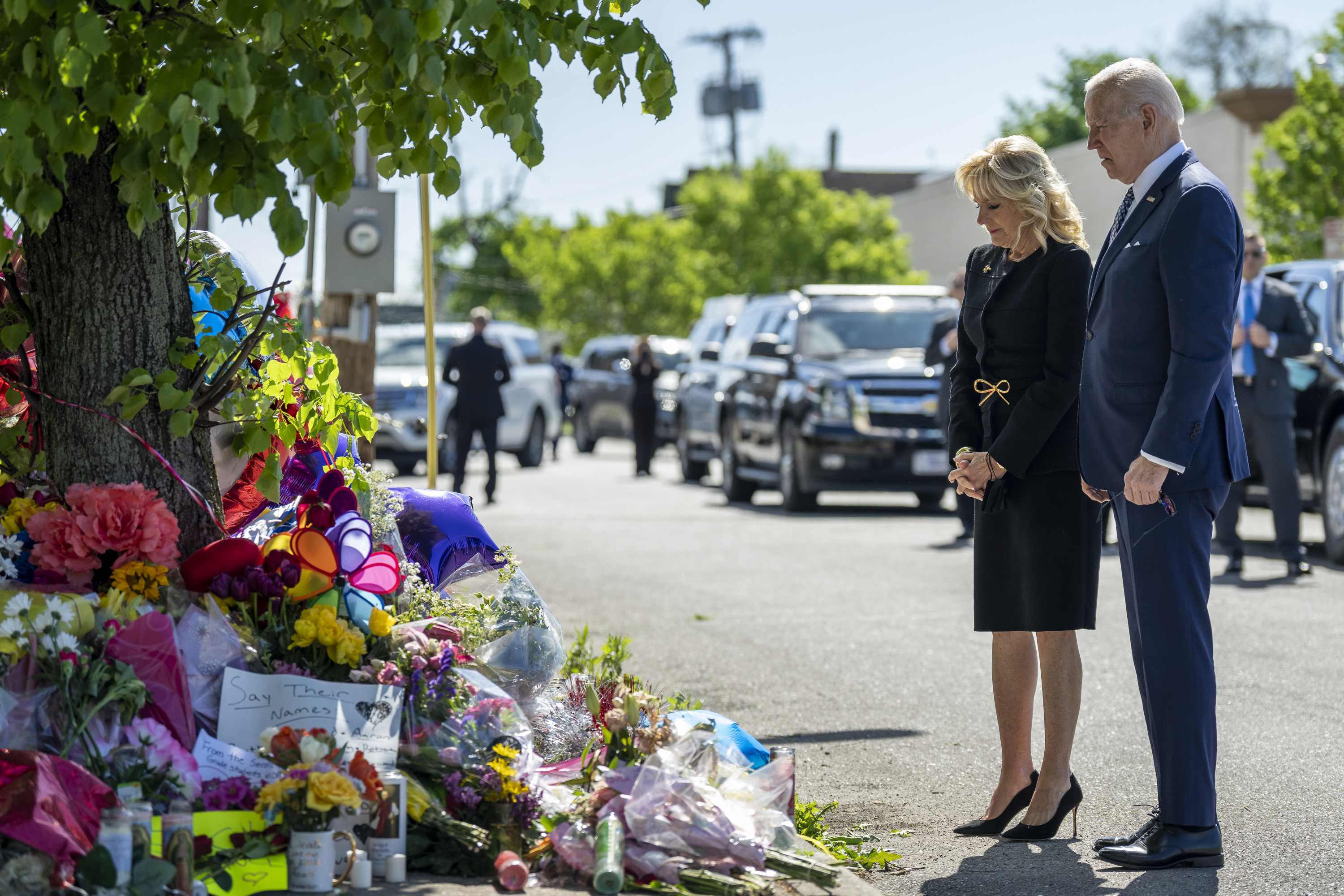
President Joe Biden and First Lady Jill Biden visit the memorial

President Joe Biden offered his prayers for the victims and their families; he called the shooting a racially motivated hate crime, an act of domestic terrorism, and went on to call white supremacy a "poison ... running through our body politic".

=== Twitch response ===
Twitch confirmed that its service was used to broadcast the shooting. It said that the account that posted the livestream had been indefinitely suspended and that any attempts to re-stream the footage would be monitored and prohibited. Gendron's livestream was removed less than two minutes after the violence started according to a spokesperson; it was unclear if he was still actively firing at the time. The livestream was recorded by at least one individual and posted to the site Streamable, where it had acquired more than 3 million views by May 15. The spread of the video on other sites has led to discussions about social media sites' liability, responses to similar content, and free speech on the sites.

=== Usage of Gendron's rhetoric by others ===
American publications widely condemned the conspiracy theories—including the notion of a white genocide supposedly occurring in the U.S.—advocated by the assailant. The Daily Beast journalist Andy Craig has argued that beliefs "centered around the claim that there is a deliberate plot to commit to genocide against white Americans—using non-white immigration as its supposed primary means" created a "noxious brew of ideas" that animated the killer, recommending that all supporters of freedom of speech as an ideal condemn such extremist thinking. Gendron's claim of a Great Replacement has drawn increased scrutiny of Republican political and media figures who have made statements embracing or echoing the conspiracy, most prominently Fox News commentator Tucker Carlson. National Review, a conservative news magazine, criticized this scrutiny of Carlson, with columnist Dan McLaughlin saying: "He never mentioned Tucker Carlson, and [he] expressed his hatred for Fox News [in the manifesto]." In response, Carlson said that the suspect's manifesto was "not recognizably left-wing or right-wing; it's not really political at all. The document is crazy." However, Kate Maltby, writing for The Jewish Chronicle, drew attention to language Gendron used in his reported manifesto attacking diversity, which is similar to wording Carlson employed in one of his broadcasts. House Republican Conference chair Elise Stefanik, the third highest-ranking Republican in the U.S. House, also had attention drawn to her hardline views in the conspiracy theory that the Democratic Party is trying to replace or overwhelm Republican voters with immigrants, using an open-door immigration policy in order to win elections.

Footage from the Buffalo shooting was reportedly included on a violence-glorifying website created by the Colorado Springs nightclub shooting's suspect.

=== Legislative ===
The proposed Domestic Terrorism Prevention Act, which would have established domestic terrorism offices in the D.O.J. and F.B.I. focused on neo-Nazis and white supremacy, passed the House on May 18 but failed in the Senate on May 26. Republicans argued that the measure duplicated already existing efforts by American law enforcement while also risking targeting individuals unfairly as political extremists. Democrats noted the tough polarization in Congress while arguing that the Republicans failed to compromise on pragmatic changes to fight gun deaths.

On June 7, 2022, the United States Senate Committee on the Judiciary held hearings to examine "the 'Metastasizing' Domestic Terrorism Threat After the Buffalo Attack." The Committee heard testimony from the son of rampage victim Ruth Whitfield, former commissioner of the Buffalo Fire Department Garnell Whitfield Jr., who asked the committee, "to imagine the faces of your mothers as you look at the face of my mother, Mrs. Ruth Whitfield... and ask yourself... is there nothing we can do? Is there nothing that you personally are willing to do to stop the cancer of white supremacy and the domestic terrorism it inspires?".

In response to this attack, as well as the Robb Elementary School shooting in Uvalde, Texas that occurred 10 days afterwards, the New York State Legislature passed laws banning semi-automatic sales to most people under 21 as well as certain types of body armor.

=== Local ===
New York Governor Kathy Hochul traveled to Buffalo to assist with the response. Governor Hochul said "we'll be aggressive in our pursuit of anyone who subscribes to the ideals professed by other white supremacists and how there's a feeding frenzy on social media platforms where hate festers more hate." Hochul called for stronger federal gun violence prevention legislation, saying "What has made this so lethal, and so devastating for this community, was the high-capacity magazine that would have had to have been purchased elsewhere, that's not legal in the state of New York."

The Erie County Sheriff's Office tweeted their condolences to all of the victims and their families and offered resources and personnel to assist the officers.

The attorney for one of the victims' families, Benjamin Crump, has argued that public policy changes need to take place to fight political extremist activism as a result of the shooting. He remarked, "We have to direct our attention to these internet sites that inspire these young people that are radicalizing them to be hate-mongers, to be people who hate people because of the color of their skin."

The New York State Education Department announced that it was cancelling the U.S. Government and History Regents Exam because it contained a question that the department determined might be upsetting to students in the aftermath of the shooting. The state did not specify what the question said or why it may have been objectionable. Canisius University, a local university that Aaron Salter Jr. had previously attended, posthumously awarded him a bachelor's degree during their 2022 graduation ceremony.

=== International ===
Canadian Prime Minister Justin Trudeau condemned the attack. Buffalo is on the Canadian border and is adjacent to Fort Erie, Ontario. Jim Diodati, the mayor of Niagara Falls, Ontario, called Buffalo mayor Byron Brown to express his solidarity with Buffalo. Flags in Niagara Falls were lowered at half-mast in honor of the victims.

== Legacy ==
The Buffalo & Erie County Public Library is developing an intentional and authentic record of the 2022 Buffalo shooting. This collection work will include oral history recordings and the preservation of mementos that will create a repository of collective memory.

A coalition to document the tragedy includes Buffalo & Erie County Public Library, The Buffalo History Museum, Buffalo State University, Burchfield Penney Art Center, Canisius University, Darwin D. Martin House, Michigan Street African American Heritage Corridor, The Patricia H. and Richard E. Garman Art Conservation Department, Uncrowned Queens Institute for Research and Education on Women, victims' family members, survivors, and broader community members. According to the coalition, "the mission is to create a historical record that will demonstrate to current and future generations a true account of the tragedy that took the lives of ten innocent people, wounded three others, and forever changed the history of our city".

=== Permanent memorials ===
Two years after the shooting on May 14, 2024, Tops dedicated the "5/14 Honor Space" on the corner of the Jefferson Avenue store lot. The store-site memorial was designed with community input and features a sculpture called "Unity", which was designed by Buffalo-based artist Valeria Cray and her son Hiram, in addition to 10 granite bollards honoring the shooting victims. On the same day, the final design for a larger memorial, named "Seeing Us", was unveiled. The larger memorial, whose site is yet to be determined, was designed by Jin Young Song and Douglass Alligood. It will feature an interconnected arch structure with inscriptions about the ten victims on each respective pillar, an indoor gathering space for events and exhibits, and an elevated, park-like "Memorial Walk" on top of the building overlooking the arches.

== See also ==
- Christchurch mosque shootings copycat crimes
- Domestic terrorism in the United States
- List of mass shootings in the United States in 2022
- Timeline of terrorist attacks in the United States
