= Bushmaster XM-15 =

Brand of semi-automatic rifles and carbines based on the AR-15 platform

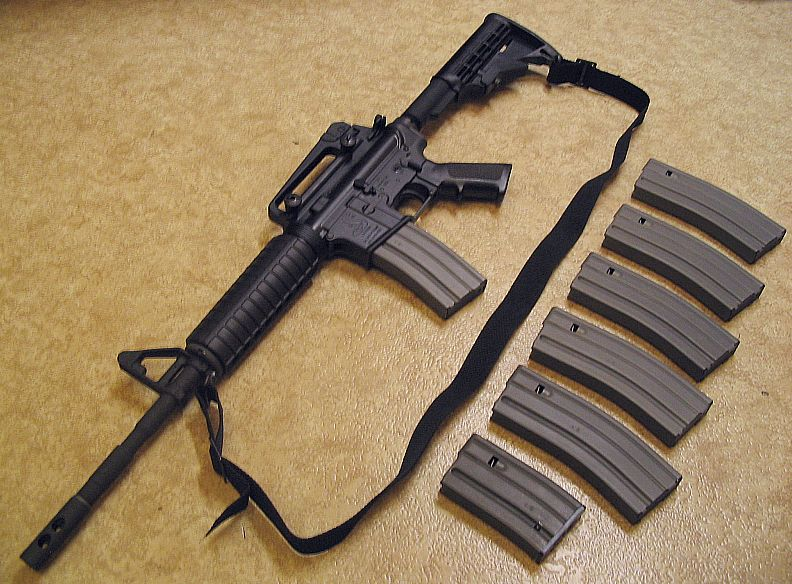
- A Bushmaster XM-15 carbine with a sling, 6 30- and 1 20- round magazines
- Type: Semi-automatic rifle/carbine/ AR-15 style rifle
- Place of origin: United States

Service history
- Wars: War in Iraq (2013–2017); Syrian Civil War

Production history
- Manufacturer: Bushmaster Firearms International, LLC
- Produced: 1980s–2020 2021–present

Specifications
- Mass: 8.27 lb (3.75 kg) (20" barrel, without magazine)
- Length: 38.25 in (97.2 cm) (20" barrel)
- Barrel length: 20 in (51 cm) (rifle), 16 in (41 cm) (carbine)
- Caliber: .223 Remington / 5.56×45mm NATO
- Action: Gas-operated, closed rotating bolt, Stoner bolt and carrier piston
- Rate of fire: Semi-auto
- Muzzle velocity: 3,260 feet per second (990 m/s) (rifle), 3,100 feet per second (940 m/s) (carbine)
- Effective firing range: 600 yards (550 m)
- Maximum firing range: 3,865 yards (3,534 m)
- Feed system: STANAG magazine, 30 rounds
- Sights: A2-style front post

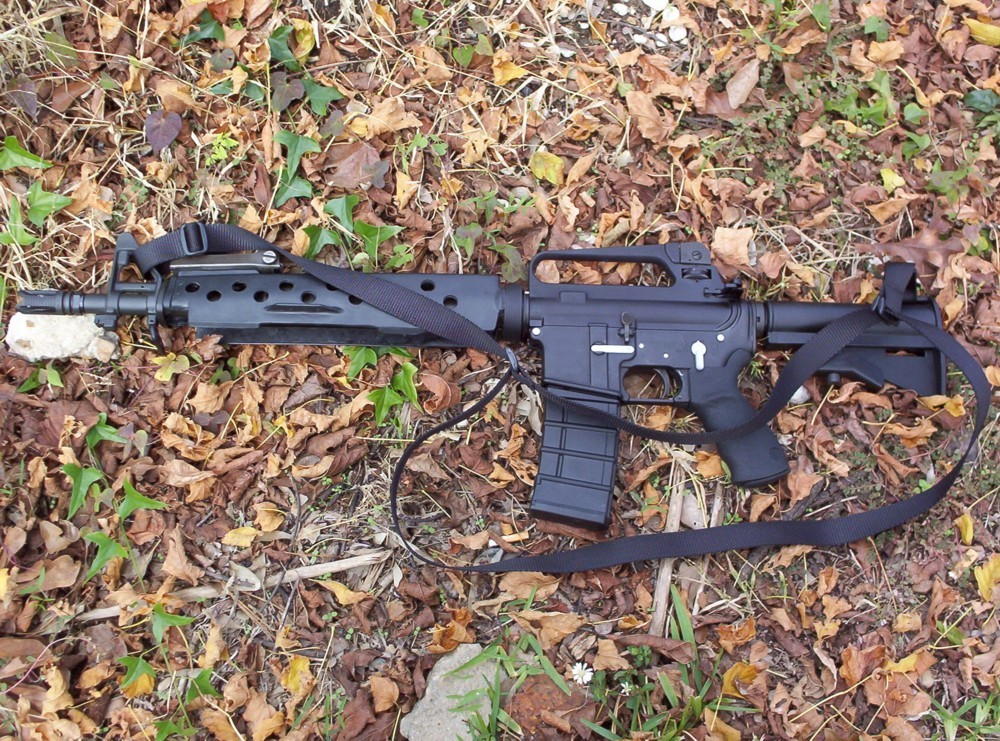
Bushmaster Dissipator Model XM-15 rifle with aftermarket handguards

The Bushmaster XM-15 series (or XM15) is a line of AR-15 style semi-automatic rifles and carbines manufactured by Bushmaster Firearms International, LLC. Variants include the Bushmaster M4-type Carbine, Patrolman series, QRC series, Bushmaster XM15-E2S, and the Carbon 15 line.

== Variants ==
The standard XM-15 has a forged 7075T6 aircraft-grade aluminum upper and lower receiver. Barrels of XM-15 firearms have a heavy profile and are hard chrome-lined 4150 alloy steel or 416 stainless steel. In Bushmaster's 2016 sales brochure, all new-production XM-15s are stated to be supplied with a 4150 steel barrel. The standard barrel has rifling of 1 turn in 9".

=== E2S Series ===
The basic E2S is fitted with a 16-inch carbine-style barrel.

==== E2S Target ====
20" heavy-barrel target rifle with A2-style stock and carry handle upper, also available with 24" and 26" barrels.

==== E2S Shorty ====
16-inch version with a "shorty" handguard.

==== E2S Shorty AK ====
Shorty variant with 14.5-inch carbine SBR barrel with an AK-74-style muzzle brake permanently welded to the end to increase the overall length to 16 inches.

==== E2S Dissipator ====
Variant with a Bushmaster-designed 16-inch "Dissipator" barrel. This mounts a disused gas block with a front sight at the 20" position with the actual used gas block in the carbine position and concealed under a rifle-length 12" handguard allowing more forearm support and room to accessorize the rifle.

=== QRC Series ===
Formerly known as ORC ("optics ready carbine"), but now styled as QRC ("quick response carbine"), are flat-top rifles without iron sights, provided with a simple 1x20 red-dot optic. QRC is chambered in 5.56x45mm with a 1:8 twist melonite coated barrel, M16 style bolt carrier group & mil-spec buffer tube.

=== Patrolman Series ===
7" or 10.5" barrel "pistol" version with a free-float handguard and no stock. Also available as a military or LE select-fire version.

== Notoriety ==
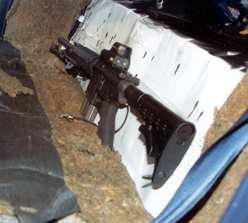
The Bushmaster XM-15 used by the D.C. snipers during their attacks in October 2002

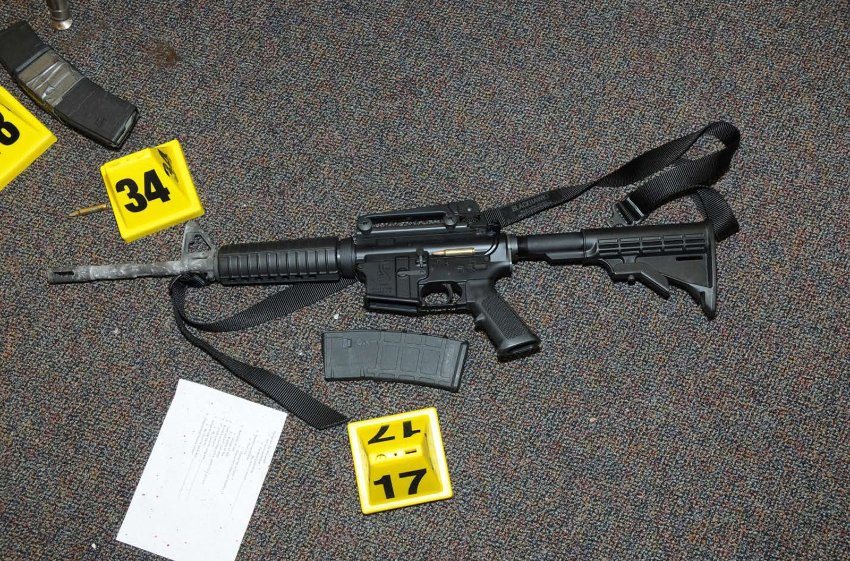
The Bushmaster XM15-E2S used in the Sandy Hook Elementary School shooting

The Bushmaster XM15-E2S "M4 type" carbine first gained notoriety for its use in the October 2002 Beltway sniper attacks.

A Bushmaster XM15-E2S carbine was displayed in a February 2011 video message by Caucasus Emirate leader Dokka Umarov. Bushmaster rifles were captured by pro-Russian forces during the Russo-Georgian War.

A Bushmaster XM-15 was used in the December 2012 Sandy Hook Elementary School shooting. Just before the second anniversary of the massacre, nine families of the 26 victims of the shooting filed a class action lawsuit in Connecticut against Bushmaster, Remington Arms and others, seeking "unspecified" damages for the defendants' purported negligent entrustment and illegal marketing of the XM-15 rifle. Plaintiffs argued that both theories of liability fell within exceptions to the 2005 Protection of Lawful Commerce in Arms Act, which affords broad civil immunity to gun manufacturers. The case was dismissed in superior court and was appealed to the Connecticut Supreme Court.

In March 2019, the Connecticut Supreme Court reinstated the wrongful death lawsuit, holding that the plaintiffs successfully pleaded a cause of action for illegal marketing. Remington appealed to the United States Supreme Court, which denied review on November 12, 2019. On February 15, 2022, Remington Arms insurers settled with families of Sandy Hook victims and agreed to pay a total of $73 million to families.

An XM-15 rifle was also used in the 1997 North Hollywood shootout (illegally converted to full auto), the 2018 Nashville Waffle House shooting, and the 2022 Buffalo shooting.

An XM15-E2 was captured from Islamic State fighters in Sinjar Mountains by Peshmerga during the Iraqi Civil War.

== Legality ==
As of October 2, 2000, California has banned the Bushmaster XM15 by name in the Kasler v. Lockyer Assault Weapon List, among other AR-style rifles by Armalite, DPMS, Colt, and Eagle Arms, to name a few.

As a result of the Sandy Hook school shooting:

- New York State banned the Bushmaster XM-15 series and assault weapons in the January 2013 NY SAFE Act.
- The XM-15 series is among over 100 named firearms added to the Connecticut state assault weapon ban list in an April 2013 amendment, passed in the wake of the Sandy Hook school shooting.

== Users ==
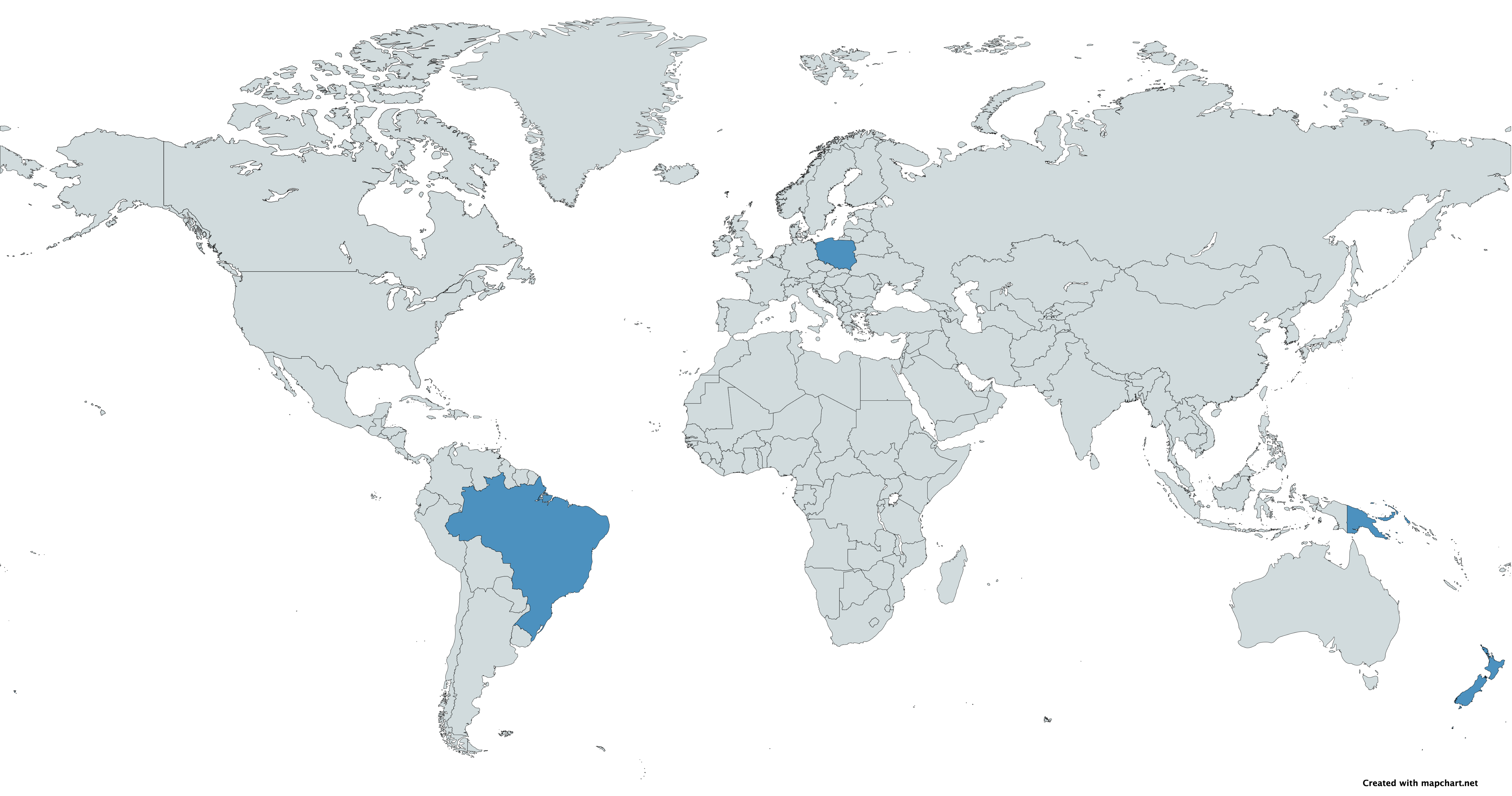
A map with users of the Bushmaster XM-15 in blue

- Brazil: Federal Police of Brazil
- New Zealand: New Zealand Police
- Papua New Guinea
- Poland: Used by JW GROM.
- United States
  - Anaheim Police Department
  - Los Angeles Police Department
  - Marina Police Department
  - Maryland-National Capital Park Police
  - Somerville Police Department (Massachusetts): Their use-of-force policy authorizes the Bushmaster XM-15-E2S as a patrol rifle.
  - Stockton Police Department (California): Approximately 30 Bushmaster XM-15s in inventory for sworn personnel.

=== Non-state actors ===
- Islamic State of Iraq and the Levant
- Caucasus Emirate
