= A. J. Verel =

American kickboxer, martial artist, actor, and stuntman

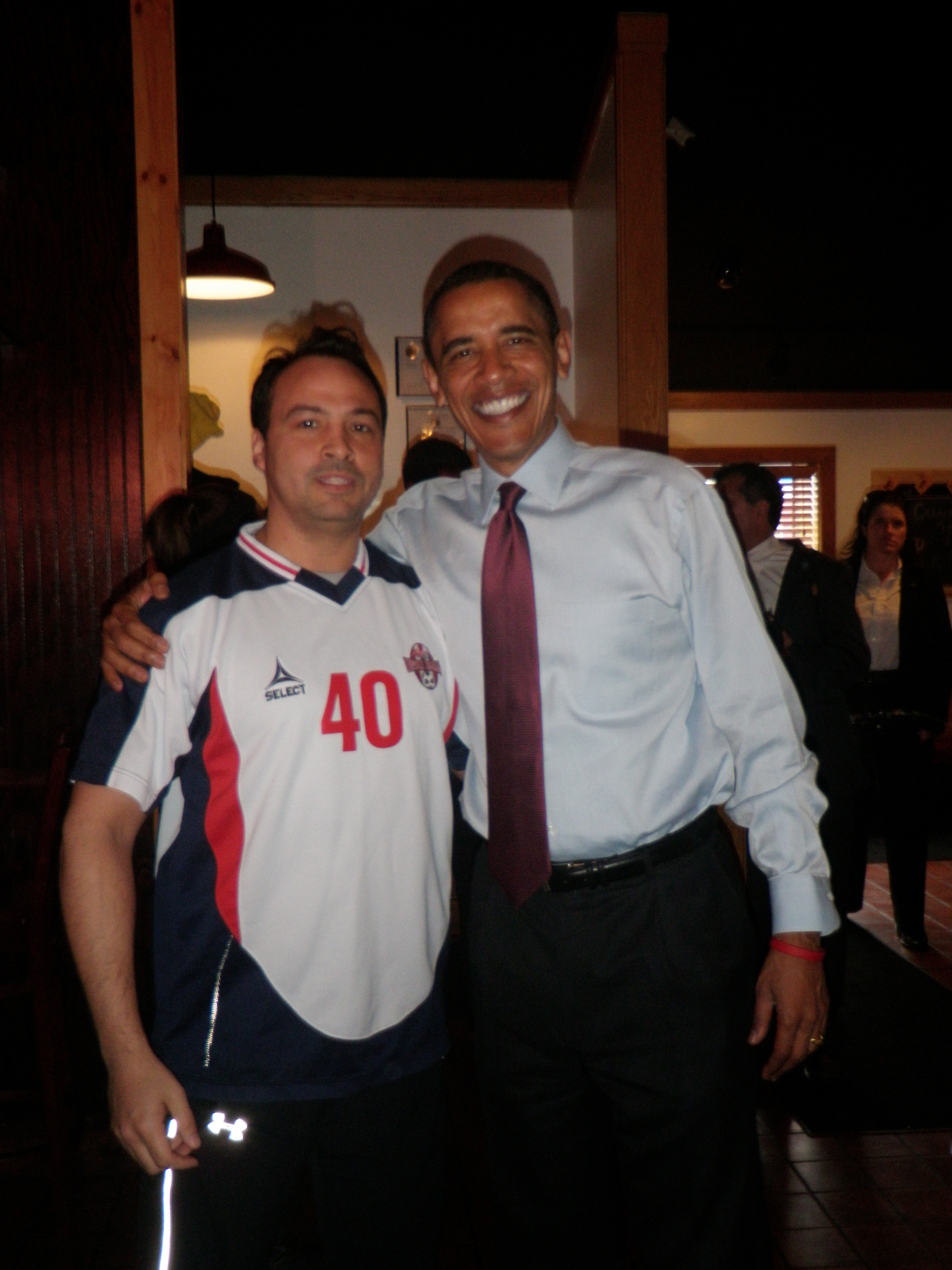
A.J. Verel & President Barack Obama

A.J. Verel (born March 2) is an American kickboxer, martial artist, actor, stuntman raised in South Buffalo, NY. Verel is a former Toughman Champion and Light Heavyweight & Middleweight sport karate and kickboxing Champion. In 1992 he won the World Kickboxing Association's (WKA) Middleweight title. Verel holds black belts in five different martial arts and as co-captain of the U.S. National Martial Arts and N.A.C.K. (North American Champions Karate) Demonstration Teams won two gold medals. Verel is an inductee into the Pro Martial Art/MMA Hall of Fame.

Verel returned to the Original Toughman Contest in 2000 as the shows referee for the FOX televised reality show titled Toughman World Championship Series which ran for five seasons on the FX Network. In June 2010 Verel was named the United States Delegate for the 'World Kickboxing League" (WKL) for all Ring Sports along with Ambassadors "The Jet" Rick Roufus and "The Dragon" Don Wilson.

In 2003, Verel suffered a sudden and tragic loss when his manager, and older brother Christopher M. Verel, was shot and killed by a person with mental illness. The individual was armed with a semi-automatic rifle when he opened fire on a group of people fishing on Buffalo's outer harbor waterfront. Verel a proponent for 2nd amendment gun rights has fought to secure better safeguards in keeping guns out of the hands of those with mental illness and advocated for a memorial for his brother. The street where he was murdered now bears his name. In 2018 Verel lost another brother who perished in a house fire.

Since retiring from sports Verel is President/Chairman of two non-profits and working as an AVP for employee & labor relations and contract negotiator for a large hospital medical group.

In addition, Verel remains active working on and appearing in movies, producing televised events, occasionally providing interviews and expert commentary, most recently in the Alec Baldwin accidental shooting death of cinematographer Halyna Hutchins and injury to director Joel Souza on the movie set of “Rust”.

== Education ==
Verel holds degrees in Psychology, Business, Education and Labor Relations

== Sports career ==
=== Martial arts ===
Verel holds black belts in five different styles of martial arts and has been training since the age of 9. Verel was a member of the U.S. / Canadian (Can/Am) Tae Kwon Do demonstration team and the N.A.C.K. Team, which won two gold medals in 1988 and 1992. Like fellow kickboxers "Joe Lewis", "Troy Dorsey", "Benny Urquidez", and "Rick Roufus", Verel has a strong classical boxing background. Verel is credited with fellow Hall of Famers Joe Lewis, "Bill Wallace, and Troy Dorsey, for winning both World Sport Karate and Kickboxing Titles in the same year.

=== The Original Toughman Contest and Refereeing ===
In 1991 and 1992 Verel won two consecutive boxing competitions in the "Toughman Contest". In 2000 Verel returned to the Original Toughman Contest as the resident referee for the hit television reality show that ran on FOX's FX network from 2000-2004. This role highlighted his expertise in combative sports, which he further demonstrated by officiating over 2,500 boxing matches and numerous MMA events across various states and countries as well as making numerous appearances as a guest referee for the WWE in cross promotions.

=== Kickboxing ===
Verel's competitive achievements are notable; he won multiple world titles in kickboxing across two weight classes. The "World Kickboxing Association" (WKA) Middleweight title in 1992 and "World Kickboxing Organization" (WKO), the "World Kickboxing Council" (WKC) and "World Kickboxing League" (WKL).

=== Mixed Martial Arts ===
As a pioneer of MMA, Verel coached and trained fighters including Kevin Rosier and Harold Howard for the "Ultimate Fighting Championship" I-VII, the "International Fighting Championships", "King Of The Cage", and Combat Zone as well as being an alternate fighter himself.

== Media ==
=== Stage ===
In 1993 Verel was featured in two EQUITY professional stage productions, Anything Goes, with Tony Award Winning Actress Debbie Shapiro-Gravitte and Tony nominated Actor Ray DeMattis and also the production Damn Yankees with Brian Sutherland.

=== Television ===
In 2000 returned to the Original Toughman Contest as the chief official and resident referee for the hit television reality show that ran on FOX's FX network from 2000 to 2004 that featured Eric "Butterbean" Esch along with commentators Matt Vasgersian and NFL Hall of Famer Lawrence Taylor. This role highlighted his expertise in combative sports, which he further demonstrated by officiating over 2,500 boxing matches and numerous MMA events across various states and countries. Verel has served as a boxing analyst for Fox Sports, CNN, PPV, CTV, SportsBlast TV and Sunshine Sports.

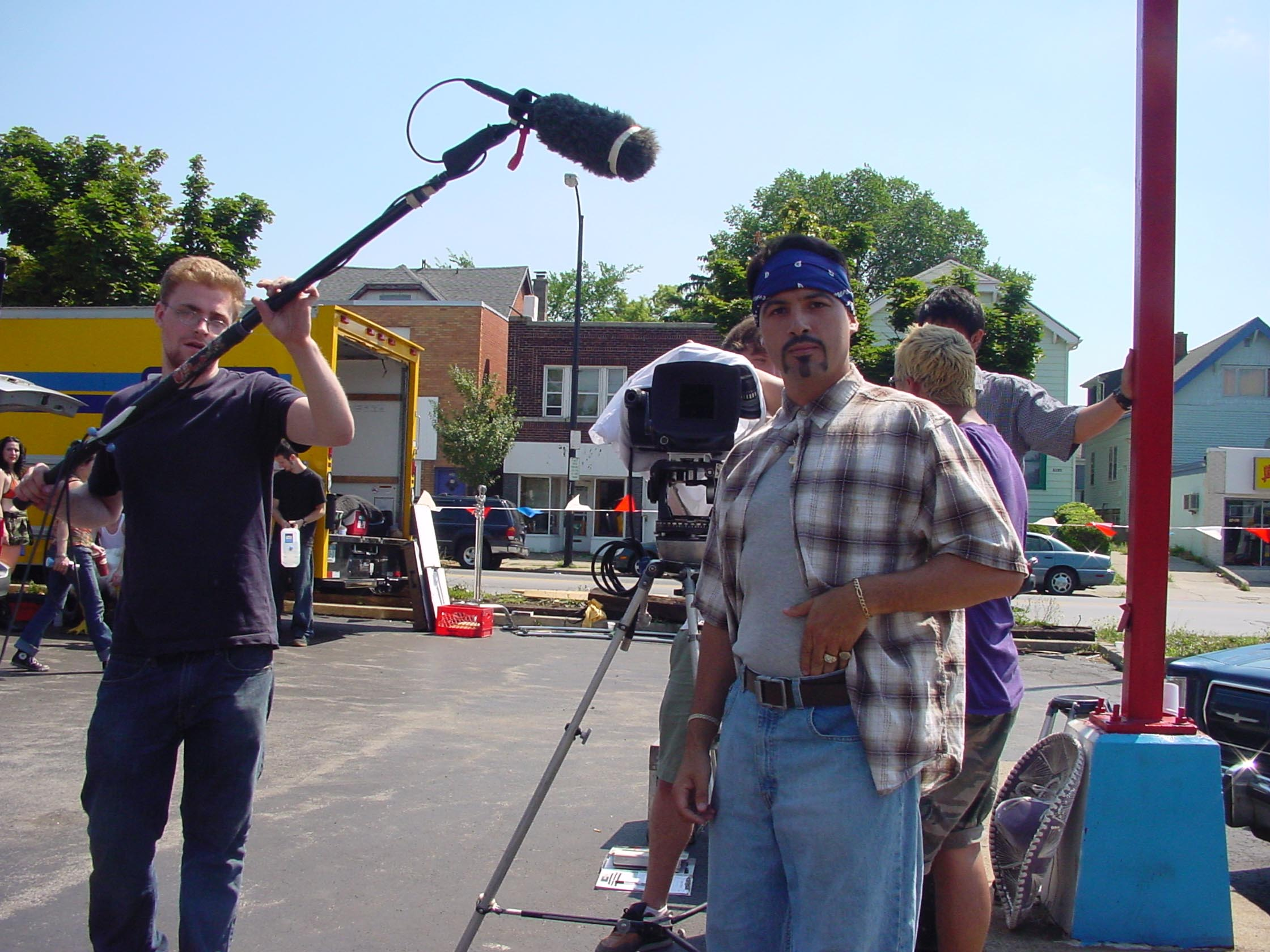
On film shootings Poultrygeist

=== Film ===
Verel first appeared in Talons of the Eagle and T.C. 2000 with Tae Bo creator Billy Blanks. Verel became a SAG/AFTRA union actor and stunt coordinator after having appeared in Against the Ropes, which starred Meg Ryan, Omar Epps, Tony Shalhoub and Tim Daly. The film was also directed by actor/director Charles S. Dutton.

Since then, Verel has appeared in more than 20 features films to date including Moving Target, Shadow Creature, Poultrygeist, Little Chicago, STAR TREK, Unstoppable, Starring Denzel Washington and Chris Pine, Tammy, The American Side, Best Man Holiday, The Amazing Spider-Man 2 and Nightmare Alley, Starring Bradley Cooper and directed by Academy Award Winning Director Guillermo del Toro.

=== Production ===
Behind the camera Verel has been in the role of stunt coordinator/stunt performer/second unit director and producer on a number of projects. Such as Shadow Creature, T.C. 2000, Talons of the Eagle, Star Trek, Back in Action, Emilie, Mercy, To Catch the Fair One, A Quiet Place II, and The Brawl in the Falls, which featured heavyweight title fight between boxers "Big" Michael Grant (boxer), and "The Italian Hitman" Paul Marinaccio.

== Professional, Political & Philanthropic Career ==
Verel has been active politically regarding combative sports legislation. He played a pivotal role in advocating for the legalization of mixed martial arts (MMA) in New York after it was banned in 1997 by then Gov. George Pataki. His efforts included collaborating with the UFC and Bellator executives, including Dana White, Reed Harris, Marc Ratner & Bjorn Rebney, in drafting proposals aimed at establishing regulatory frameworks for these sports. His Bill proposal called for establishing and promulgating rules for professionals and a commission to oversee all amateur combative sports and single discipline martial arts. The Bill finally saw passage and was signed into Law by New York Gov.Andrew Cuomo in 2016.

Verel also continues to stay active as a lobbying consultant for various entities through his consulting group Strategic Management Associates, most recently on NYS A5322 and S4246 in 2024.

Having been a guest for many celebrity golf tournaments over the years it was Pro Football Hall of Famer James Lofton who originally brought A.J. Verel in to join them. From 1996 to 2006 Verel was a member of the Buffalo Bills Alumni Charity Golf Tournament Board along with Lou Piccone, Charley Ferguson, Bob Duggan, Jeff Nixon, Dwayne Crutchfield, Marlo Perry, Booker Edgerson, Hall of Famer Joe DeLamielleure, Ed Rutkowski and Buffalo Sabres Alumni René Robert & Rick Martin.

Verel still participates in many charity tournaments annually and has hosted his own for the past 14 years.

In 2012 Verel ran for a vacant seat on the City of Buffalo's Common Council. Though he was initially considered a standout and favor in the race, after 3 months and unable to break a 4–4 tie vote, he failed to gain the necessary support for appointment. This was after false allegations of a criminal history and prison sentence arose. On April 25, 2012 "The Buffalo News" reported that Verel had been arrested for Burglary. The first, in 1989, alleged a conviction and prison sentence served between July 20, 1989, and May 31, 1991. However no credible evidence has ever been provided to support this. Searches of State and Federal Records show no conviction, sentence or incarceration. The story goes on to allege that Verel was again arrested on second degree burglary charges in 1998. Again, no evidence exists in Court Records to support this allegation. Verel opened action against news carrier for Reckless Disregard for the Truth citing New York Times Co. v. Sullivan, 376 U.S. 254. He then lost to Christopher Scanlon in the general election a few months later.

In 2014 Verel was sworn in as a Reserve Deputy Sheriff by Tim Howard (sheriff) of Erie County, New York, where he was assigned to the Scientific Staff Division.

In 2015 A.J. Verel was elected and sworn in as the 52nd President of the Judges & Police Executives Conference of Erie County, NY, a non-profit organization that was formed in 1932. Under Verel's leadership it has expanded to work with programs through the various court systems that identify at-risk-youth and provide positive mentorship to them. The organization also runs events that recognize those in the law enforcement, judiciary, legal and business community who have made significant contributions to the region and their respected fields. In addition, the organization also provides scholarships to high school students who are seeking careers in various legal and business fields through its Scholarship Program and donations from the Paul A. Saffrin Foundation.

The Legal & Business Professionals, also headed by Verel, through its annual Toy Drive provides toys to families in need during the Christmas Holiday Season throughout WNY and the Southern Tier serving Erie, Niagara, Steuben, Schuyler and Chemung Counties and parts of Northern PA.

Since 1997 Verel has donated boxing rings, marital arts and gym equipment to facilities in the cities of Buffalo, Bath, Elmira and Binghamton, NY to get kids off the street helping those areas provide healthier physical exercise opportunities to children and young adults through sanctioned programs. Verel also has been an HR & Safety consultant to Billionaire Adam Weitsman, a leader in the scrap metal business and philanthropist from the Owego, NY area who is also a top social media influencer.

In 2023 Verel was sworn in and promoted to the Rank of Captain in charge of Professional Standards and Governmental Relations with the City of Buffalo Special Police.

In 2024 Verel was appointed and sworn in as a New York State Trooper assigned as a trustee to the PBA's Signal 30 division and in 2026 was appointed the Chief Medical Administrator for the NYS Police Surgeons Group.

Verel is currently the Associate Vice-president for employee & labor relations and contract negotiator for one of the largest private Medical Groups covering Central and Southern NY & Northern PA.

== Career highlights ==
| Year | Event Description |
|---|---|
| 1986 | Pro Debut Canton Civic Center (WKA) |
| 1988 | U.S. TKD Demo Team (Result: Team Gold Medal) (WKA) |
| 1991 | Toughman Contest Champion |
| 1992 | U.S. DEMO TKD & N.A.C.K. Team Co-Capt. (Result: Team Gold Medal) (WKA) |
| 1992 | Toughman Contest Champion |
| 1992 | Hard Knock Series Atlantic City, NJ – 4th-round decision over John Lucarrelli |
| 1992 | WKA World Championship Title Fight Asheville, NC (72.5 kg-160 lbs) Ø Opponent: Derrick "The Destroyer" Littlefield (Arkansas) (Title Holder) Ø Result: TKO 3rd round |
| 1992 | Feature Film: Moving Target w/ Gerry Cooney |
| 1993 | Feature Film : Talons of the Eagle w/ Billy Blanks |
| 1993 | Klassic Karate Cup Buffalo, NY |
| 1993 | Independent Film: Too Much Too Soon |
| 1993 | ArtPark Lewiston, NY Summer Production "Anything Goes" w/ Tony award-winning actress Debbie Shapiro |
| 1993 | UFC 1 Denver, CO |
| 1994 | Klassic Karate Cup Dallas, TX |
| 1994 | Feature Film: TC 2000 w/ Billy Blanks |
| 1994 | International Professional Tae Kwon Do Federation (IPTF) Man of the Year |
| 1994 | WKO World Championship Fight Yakima, WA Ø WKO Super Middleweight (72.5–76 kg – 164 lbs) World Championship Ø Opponent: Takuro Takahashi (Kanazawa, Japan) (Title Holder) Ø Result: KKO 7th round |
| 1995 | WKC World Championship Fight HorseHeads, NY Ø WKC Light Heavyweight (76–79 kg – 174 lbs) World Championship Ø Opponent: Marc "Nasty" Naughton (Chico, CA) (Vacant Title) Ø Result: Majority Decision |
| 1995 | Feature Film: Shadow Creature |
| 2000 –2004 | Toughman Contest Referee_Fox Sports Network_FX Channel |
| 2002 | Feature Film: Against the Ropes w/ Meg Ryan, Tony Shalhoub, Omar Epps, Tim Daly, and Charles Dutton |
| 2003 | Romulus Club and Ilio DiPaolo Award |
| 2003 | Induction into World Karate & KickBoxing Hall of Fame |
| 2003 | World Karate Union Hall of Fame |
| 2003 | United States Martial Arts Association Hall of Fame / Lifetime Achievement |
| 2000–2003 | SportsBlast TV |
| 2003 | CNN Boxing Analyst |
| 2003 | LCTV Color Commentator |
| 2003 | Action Martial Art Magazine Award & Induction |
| 2004 | Took over operations as GM for the Martial Arts Hall of Fame |
| 2005 | Action Martial Art Magazine Award Recipient / Outstanding Achievement in MA |
| 2006 | Action Martial Art Magazine Award Recipient / Outstanding Contributions to MA |
| 2006 | Feature Film: Poultrygeist |
| 2007 | Action Martial Art Magazine Award Recipient / Goodwill Ambassador |
| 2007 | Feature Film: Little Chicago w/ Marisa Tomei and Ray Liotta |
| 2007 | Secured Museum Chartership status for the newly restructured Pro Martial Arts Hall of Fame |
| 2008 | Action Martial Art Magazine Award Recipient / Exemplary Contributions as Ambassador |
| 2008 | TV Special: Televised Boxing "Brawl in the Falls" |
| 2008 | Named Chairman to the Official Pro Martial Arts Hall of Fame |
| 2009 | Feature Film: STAR TREK w/ Chris Pine and Zachary Quinto Directed by J. J. Abrams |
| 2010 | Action Martial Art Magazine Award Recipient / Exemplary Contributions as Ambassador |
| 2010 | Feature Film: Unstoppable w/ Denzel Washington and Chris Pine Directed by Tony Scott |
| 2011 | Feature Film: Crimson |
| 2012 | Feature Film: Battle Dogs |
| 2012 | South Park High School in Buffalo, NY Sports Hall of Fame (Inaugural Class Inductee) |
| 2013 | Feature Film: Best Man Holiday |
| 2013 | Feature Film: Tammy w/Melissa McCarthy and Susan Sarandon |
| 2014 | Feature Film: The American Side |
| 2014 | Feature Film: The Amazing-Spider-Man 2 w/Andrew Garfield and Jaime Foxx |
| 2014 | Sworn in as a Deputy Sheriff in New York |
| 2015 | Feature Film: EMELIE |
| 2016 | Feature Film: MERCY |
| 2016–Present | Elected as the 52nd President of the Judges & Police Executives Conference of Erie County, NY |
| 2018 | Feature Film: The First Purge |
| 2019 | Feature Film: Crown Vic |
| 2020 | Feature Film: Clover |
| 2020 | Feature Film: A Quiet Place II w/Cillian Murphy |
| 2021 | Feature Film: Nightmare Alley w/Bradley Cooper |
| 2022 | Feature Film: To Catch The Fair One |
| 2023 | Feature Film: Cutman |
| 2023 | Sworn in as Captain of Professional Standards & Government Affairs with the City of Buffalo Special Police |
| 2024 | Sworn into New York State Troopers PBA: Signal 30 |
| 2026 | Appointed Chief Medical Administrator NYS Police Surgeons Group |
