= Domestic Terrorism Prevention Act =

Proposed United States federal law

Domestic Terrorism Prevention Act of 2022
- Long title: To authorize dedicated domestic terrorism offices within the Department of Homeland Security, the Department of Justice, and the Federal Bureau of Investigation to analyze and monitor domestic terrorist activity and require the Federal Government to take steps to prevent domestic terrorism.

Legislative history
- Introduced in the House of Representatives as H.R. 350 by Brad Schneider (D–IL) on January 19, 2021; Committee consideration by House Judiciary Committee, House Homeland Security Committee, House Armed Services Committee; Passed the House on May 18, 2022 (222–203)

The Domestic Terrorism Prevention Act was a proposed law that would have created domestic terrorism offices within the Department of Homeland Security (DHS), the Department of Justice (DOJ), and the Federal Bureau of Investigation (FBI).

== Legislative history ==
On May 18, 2022, the Act passed the House in a 222–203 vote, with only one Republican, Adam Kinzinger (IL), voting in favor of the Act. A previous version of the Act had passed unanimously in the House in 2020. The 2022 version of the Act was proposed in response to the Buffalo Tops shooting that was motivated by racism. On May 26, Senate Republicans blocked the bill in a 47–47 vote, arguing that the bill created redundant offices and portrayed law enforcement as white supremacists.

== Reception ==
Republicans have opposed the 2022 version of the Act, comparing it to the recently paused Disinformation Governance Board (DGB) and saying that the Act could be used to censor conservatives with anti-government, anti-immigration, and anti-illegal immigration views. Republicans also argued that the measure duplicated already existing efforts by American law enforcement while also risking targeting individuals unfairly as political extremists. Democrats noted the tough polarization in Congress while arguing that the Republicans failed to compromise on pragmatic changes to fight gun deaths.

== See also ==
- Crime in the United States
- Domestic terrorism in the United States
