= Jeremy Zellner =

American politician

Member of the New York State Senate from the 61st district
- Incumbent
- Assumed office February 4, 2026
- Preceded by: Sean Ryan

Chair of the Erie County Democratic Committee
- Incumbent
- Assumed office 2012
- Preceded by: Leonard Lenihan

Personal details
- Born: Tonawanda, New York, U.S.
- Party: Democratic
- Education: Buffalo State University (BA)

Jeremy Zellner is an American politician serving as a member of the New York State Senate from the 61st district since 2026, when he won a special election. He also serves as chair of the Erie County Democratic Committee, and was the commissioner of the Erie County Board of Elections from 2017 to 2026.

His district includes parts of the Buffalo, Tonawanda, Amherst and Grand Island, as well as the villages of Kenmore and Williamsville.

== Early life and education ==
Jeremy J. Zellner was born and raised in Tonawanda, New York. His father and grandfather were both autoworkers and members of the United Auto Workers labor union, and he was raised in a single-parent household. He graduated from Buffalo State University with a bachelor's degree in political science.

== Career ==
Zellner first joined the Erie County Democratic Party in 2003 working as a volunteer. He held a number of positions before becoming party chair in 2012, succeeding Leonard Lenihan.

In 2016, Zellner served on the Hillary for America National Finance Committee, and was a statewide delegate at the 2016 Democratic National Convention. In 2024, he was a delegate representing New York's 26th congressional district at the 2024 Democratic National Convention.

Zellner served as a Democratic commissioner of the Erie County Board of Elections from 2017 to 2026, and previously served as chair of the legislative committee of the New York State Elections Commissioners Association. He resigned as commissioner in January 2026 after first being elected in 2017, in order to contest a special election in the New York State Senate.

=== New York State Senate ===
In November 2025, Sean Ryan won the 2025 Buffalo mayoral election and announced he would resign from the New York State Senate the following month, leaving his seat – the 61st district – vacant. Governor Kathy Hochul set the special election to fill the seat for February 3, 2026.

Zellner was declared the winner an hour after in-person voting ended, beating Dan R. Gagliardo, who ran on the Republican and Conservative ballot lines. He was sworn in the following day.

He serves as Chair of the Procurement and Contracts Committee, and is a member of seven other standing committees.

In the 2026 Democratic Primary for the 61st district, Zellner faced State Assemblyman Jonathan Rivera. On June 23, 2026, in what was widely regarded as an upset, Rivera defeated Zellner 55-45, with 10,076 votes to Zellner's 8,270. Zellner's loss to Rivera is credited as a factor in that year's contested race for Erie County Democratic Committee Chair, where incumbent Erie County Legislator Jeanne Vinal and Amherst Town Councilman John Davis attempted to deny Zellner an eighth two-year term.

== Personal life ==
Zellner has two children with his wife, Carrie. They live in Tonawanda.
