= William H. Fitzpatrick =

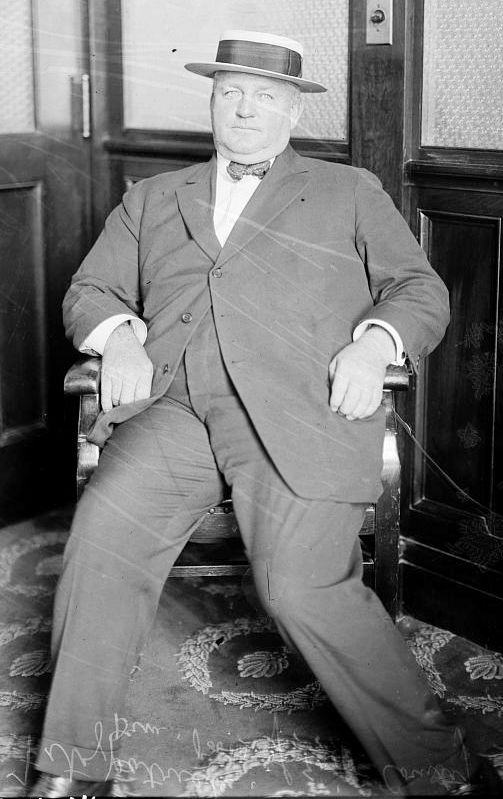
Fitzpatrick between 1910 and 1915

William H. Fitzpatrick (September 28, 1865 – January 7, 1932) was a Democratic Party official in upstate New York.

== Biography ==
William H. Fitzpatrick was born on September 28, 1865, in the family home at Bailey Avenue and Seneca Street in Buffalo, New York. He was educated locally, and worked at a variety of occupations, including driving a milk truck.

He later became active in the contracting business, and operated a successful construction company, Buffalo's W. H. Fitzpatrick & Sons.

Fitzpatrick also became active in politics as a supporter of Democratic candidates. He was the longtime Chairman of the Erie County Democratic Committee, a member of the New York State Democratic Committee, and a Delegate to several state and national Democratic conventions. He was seen as an ally of other urban Democratic leaders in New York, including Charles F. Murphy of New York City's Tammany Hall.

Fitzpatrick died on January 7, 1932, at the Hotel Pennsylvania in New York City, after having become ill while on a business trip.

The William H. Fitzpatrick Institute of Public Affairs and leadership at Canisius College is named for him.
