= Buffalo ReUse =

American nonprofit organization

- Founded: 2006
- Founder: Michael Gainer
- Type: 501(c)(3)
- Tax ID no.: 13-4355386
- Purpose: green building
- Location: Buffalo, New York
- Services: deconstruction
- Owner: ReUse Action
- Subsidiaries: East Side Parkways Coalition; Rainbow House Community School
- Website: www.buffaloreuse.org

Buffalo ReUse is an American nonprofit organization in Buffalo, New York.

Founded by green advocate Michael Gainer as a deconstruction firm in 2006, it was committed to creating jobs on Buffalo's East Side while providing affordable building materials.

After Gainer left the organization in 2010, it faced a steep decline and was eventually reacquired by Gainer in 2022. The organization has since become the nonprofit arm of Gainer's for-profit deconstruction company, ReUse Action.

== History ==
=== Founding and early success, 2006–2008 ===
Desiring to be closer to his hometown of Erie, Pennsylvania, Michael Gainer moved to Buffalo, New York from Boston, Massachusetts in 2005. He had been working that summer for Northwest Youth Corps in Oregon, and chose Buffalo over Cleveland and Pittsburgh. A Pennsylvania State University graduate in environmental and agricultural education, Gainer previously held teaching positions at the Chewonki Foundation and Vincent Smith School.

Gainer founded the nonprofit deconstruction organization Buffalo ReUse in 2006 after the city announced plans to demolish 1,000 abandoned properties on an annual basis over the course of ten years. Instead of demolition, Buffalo ReUse would instead disassemble the properties and recycle their material. This led to reduced costs for the city, added jobs in the community, and the organization opening a retail store that sold salvaged material at low prices. Its headquarters opened on the East Side of Buffalo inside 298 Northampton, a former commercial laundry.

In an interview with Dwell, Gainer explained his motivation for starting the organization:

I started crunching the numbers, and the total resources involved, for a city already struggling with poverty, meant that $150 million would be spent simply on taking down old structures. I knew there had to be a better way.

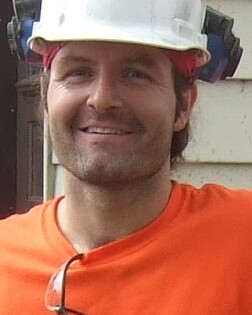
Michael Gainer, June 2007

The New York Times Magazine recognized Gainer as one of their "Faces of Social Entrepreneurship" in March 2008. That same year, Buffalo ReUse was profiled in an episode of Big Ideas for a Small Planet, and was nominated for the Urban Land Institute Sustainable Cities Award. Gainer organized the inaugural Great Lakes ReUse Conference in November 2008, which featured presentations from renowned community activists including Jay Williams, Rick Lowe and Tyree Guyton. Outside funding began supporting the organization, including a $650,000 Neighborhood Stabilization grant to start an apprenticeship program for residents without high school diplomas.

=== Gainer's exit and relocation, 2009–2011 ===
After John R. Oishei Foundation president Robert Gioia threatened to withhold its grant from the organization, the Buffalo ReUse board of directors voted to remove Michael Gainer as their operations manager in August 2009. Following public backlash, the organization's members voted to remove the board of directors in October 2009, and Gainer was reinstated. However, Gainer failed to meet the new board's expectations, and he was once again removed in September 2010. Since Gainer owned their building, the organization was forced to relocate its headquarters to a former bakery at 296 East Ferry.

The organization abandoned deconstruction projects, and without Gainer's leadership was in heavy debt by 2011.

=== ReUse Action and competing ventures, 2011–2021 ===
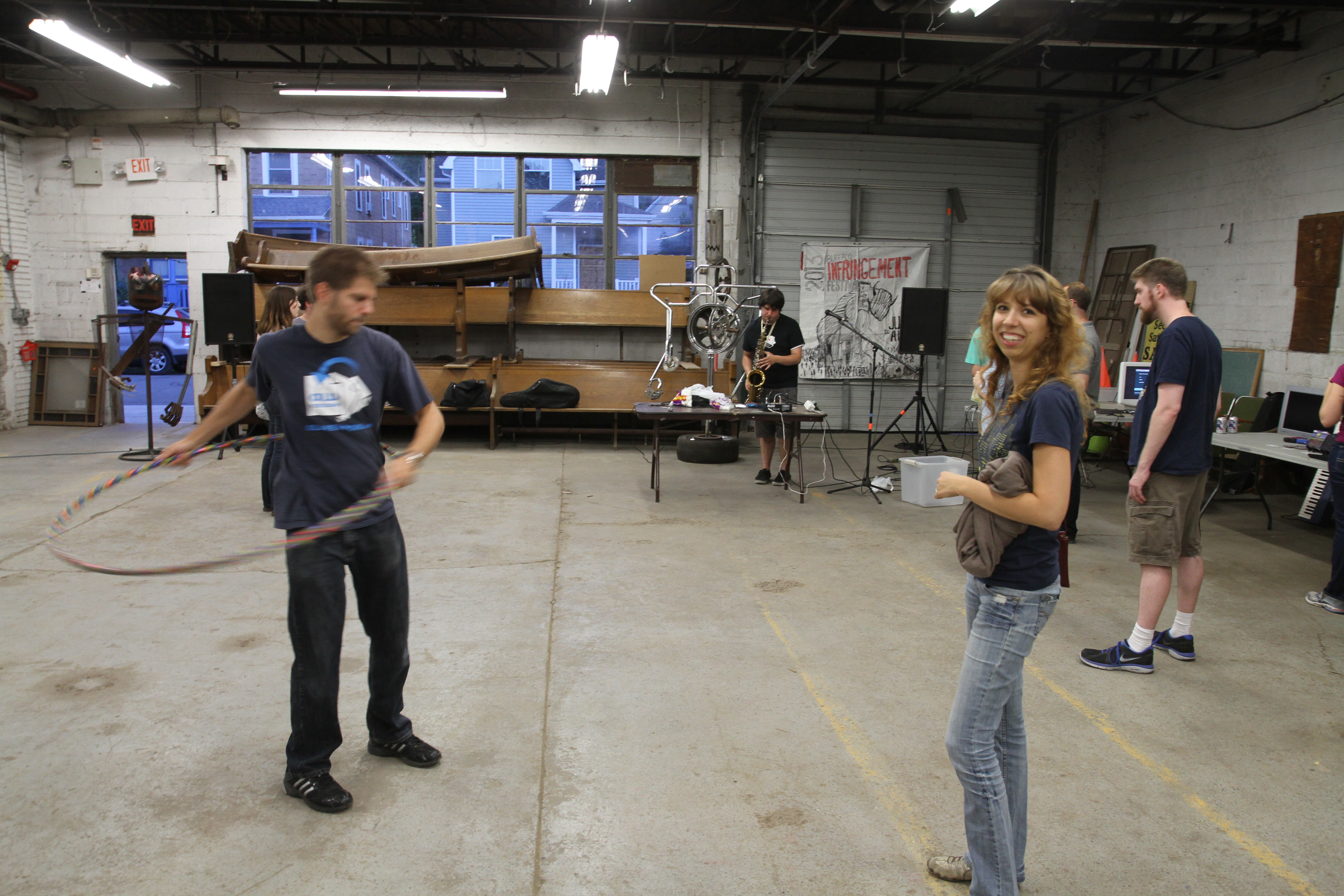
The Foundry during Buffalo Infringement Festival, July 2013

Michael Gainer founded ReUse Action in 2011, a for-profit deconstruction company specifically focused on providing apprenticeships. Its headquarters opened on the East Side of Buffalo inside 980 Northampton, a former shoe factory. The company was contracted in its first year to strip the Hotel Lafayette prior to its renovation, which provided jobs for twenty residents and led to several of them landing permanent careers.

Former Buffalo ReUse employees Caesandra Seawell and Kevin Hayes joined Gainer in 2012 to form The Foundry, a nonprofit business incubator and makerspace. Built inside the former Buffalo ReUse headquarters at 298 Northampton, The Foundry supports local entrepreneurs in their quest to develop products and business plans.

SUNY ESF students successfully lobbied in 2013 for ReUse Action to handle deconstruction of several homes the school was planning on demolishing so that their material could be recycled for new builds on campus.

=== Reacquisition and restructuring, 2022–present ===
After Buffalo ReUse closed in 2022, Michael Gainer was appointed to their board of directors and acquired the organization's name and remaining assets, which were absorbed by ReUse Action.

Buffalo ReUse is now the nonprofit arm of ReUse Action, and is used as a pass-through entity for East Side Parkways Coalition and Rainbow House Community School. East Side Parkways Coalition is an advocacy group that supports the removal of Scajaquada Expressway and restoration of Humboldt Parkway. Rainbow House Community School is a private school at 248 Northampton that utilizes the Waldorf mode of teaching.
