= Erie County Democratic Committee =

Political party in Erie County, New York

- Chairperson: Jeremy Zellner
- Governing body: Democratic Party
- Founded: 1898; 128 years ago
- Headquarters: 671 Seneca Street, Buffalo, New York 14210
- Membership: ▼281,088 (2025)
- Ideology: Modern liberalism
- New York State Assembly: 5 / 11
- New York State Senate: 2 / 3
- Erie County Legislature: 7 / 11
- Buffalo Common Council: 8 / 9

Website
- ecdems.com

The Erie County Democratic Committee (ECDC) is a regional affiliate of the Democratic Party in Erie County, New York.

It is the dominant party within the county, accounting for 44.5% of all registered voters. Comparatively, the Erie County Republican Committee holds 25.5% of the electorate.

Mirroring the national Democratic Party, the committee in its present form represents modern liberalism. It has, however, experienced periods of upheaval where factions within the organization fought against social progress. This includes the Cleveland-Jefferson Club's takeover of the organization in 1926, and four-term mayor James D. Griffin switching party affiliations to retaliate against the committee. Party support dividing in the 1980s between Griffin's conservative South Buffalo base and their rival centrist opponents is a dynamic which still exists to this day.

Jeremy Zellner is the current chairman of the committee, having served since 2012.

== Party rules ==
If it was about engagement and it was about transparency, then why not give every committee person a vote on endorsements? Why limit it to the zone chairs and the executive committee?

—Michael Gainer, 2025 Buffalo mayoral candidate and committee member

Each election district within the county is represented by two committee members. These members are elected to two-year terms, and must reside within the assembly district they represent.

The executive committee consists of the following positions, elected to two-year terms by a majority vote of the membership: chairman, nine vice-chairs, secretary, sergeant of arms, zone chairs for each Buffalo legislative district, and zone chairs for each township outside of Buffalo. The chairman also appoints twelve at-large representatives to the executive committee at their own discretion.

Only the executive committee decides on candidate endorsements, and their voting is done behind closed-doors.

== History ==
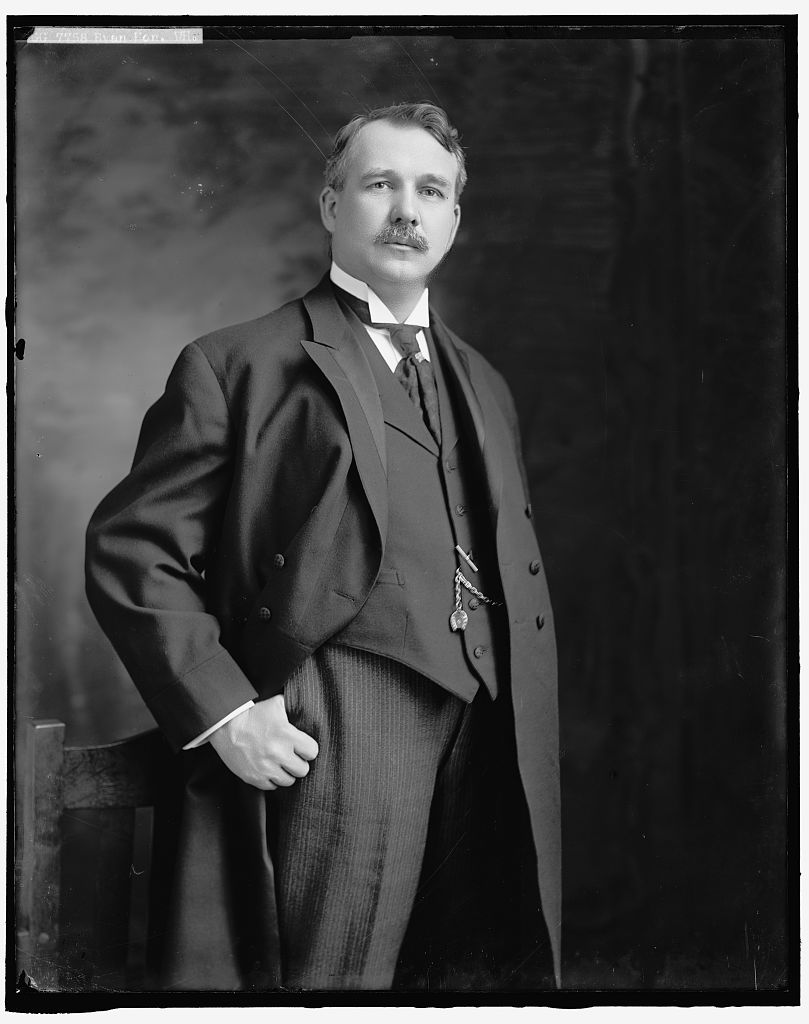
William H. Ryan, chairman 1898–1899

=== 1898–1932: Founding and Naylon's coup ===
William H. Ryan served as chairman from 1898 to 1899, leaving after his election to the United States House of Representatives.

John Cunneen served as chairman of the organization from 1900 through his ascension to Attorney General of New York in 1902.

Edward E. Coatesworth took over as the committee's chairman, serving from 1902 to 1907.

William H. Fitzpatrick served as the chairman from 1907 through 1924.

John P. Sullivan served as chairman from 1924 until his resignation in 1926. Sullivan was forced out by Henry M. Naylon's newly formed Cleveland-Jefferson Club, which sought to overtake control of the party. Committee members attempted to elect former chair William H. Ryan as Sullivan's replacement, but Naylon had his election thrown out in court.

Former Buffalo mayor Louis P. Fuhrmann, a member of the Cleveland-Jefferson Club, took over as chairman from 1926 until his death in 1931.

At the request of governor Franklin D. Roosevelt, Oliver Cabana, Jr. served as chairman for most of 1931 to ensure Democratic victories in that year's elections.

John C. Stiglmeier served out the remainder of Cabana, Jr.'s term as chairman through 1932.

=== 1932–1988: Restructuring and Griffin's rise ===
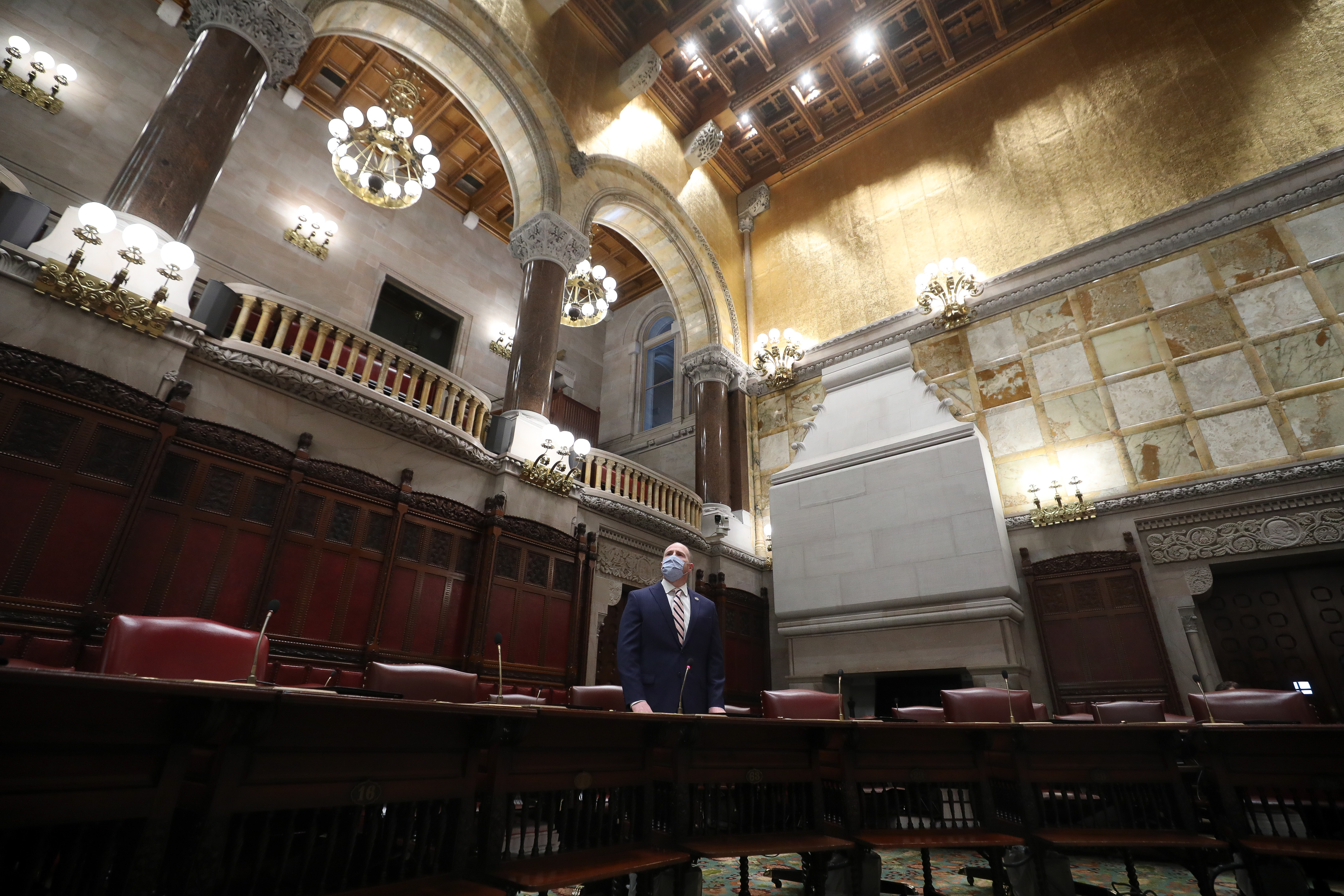
NY State Sen. Tim Kennedy acknowledging the death of former chairman Joseph F. Crangle, February 2021

George J. Zimmermann served as chair from 1932 until his election as mayor of Buffalo in 1933.

Frank J. Carr was chairman from 1934 to 1935. He was later indicted on federal gambling charges, and was acquitted in 1939.

Edward C. Dethloff served as chairman from 1936 to 1939.

Paul E. Fitzpatrick, the son of former committee chair William H. Fitzpatrick, was elected chairman in 1939 and served until resigning in 1942.

George B. Doyle served as chairman of the committee from 1942 to 1947.

William B. Mahoney, brother of state senator Walter J. Mahoney, served as chairman from 1947 to 1954.

Peter J. Crotty served as chairman from 1954 through his retirement in 1965. Crotty was personally credited by John F. Kennedy for helping him win New York State in the 1960 United States presidential election.

Joseph F. Crangle served as chairman from 1965 through his retirement in 1988, the longest term of any chair before or since. Crangle oversaw three of James D. Griffin's four terms as mayor of Buffalo, and was a frequent critic of Griffin's conservative leanings and blatant patronage. The committee became fractured between Griffin's conservative South Buffalo loyalists, and the liberal base. Crangle attempted to oust Griffin by endorsing Buffalo Common Council president George Arthur in the 1985 Buffalo mayoral election. Despite Arthur winning the primary, Griffin ran as a Republican in the general election and won. Crangle decided to retire in 1988 after Dennis Gorski, another South Buffalo Democrat, was elected as Erie County Executive.

=== 1988–2012: Pigeon's removal and minority rule ===
Vincent J. Sorrentino served as chairman from 1988 to 1996. After Sorrentino backed David Swarts in his failed campaign against incumbent county executive Dennis Gorski, Gorski lobbied against his re-election as chair.

Steve Pigeon became chairman in 1996, but was removed from his position in 2002 after the party lost many seats to Republican control. Republican Joel Giambra had unseated three-term Erie County Executive Dennis Gorski in 1999.

Len Lenihan served as chairman from 2002 to 2012, during which time the party regained control of the Erie County Executive seat.
