= Buffalo Fire Department =

Fire department for Buffalo, NY

Operational area
- Country: United States
- State: New York
- City: Buffalo

Agency overview
- Annual budget: $72,747,784 (2024)
- Staffing: Career
- Commissioner: Daniel Pizarro
- IAFF: 282
- Motto: Ut Vivant Alii (So Others May Live)

Facilities and equipment
- Divisions: 1
- Battalions: 4
- Stations: 19
- Engines: 19
- Trucks: 9
- Rescues: 1
- HAZMAT: 1
- Fireboats: 1
- Rescue boats: 2
- Light and air: 2

Website
- Official website
- IAFF website

The Buffalo Fire Department provides fire protection and first responder emergency medical services to the city of Buffalo, New York. The department serves a population of 278,349 people in a geographic area of 40.38 square miles (104.6 km^{2}).

== Stations and apparatus ==
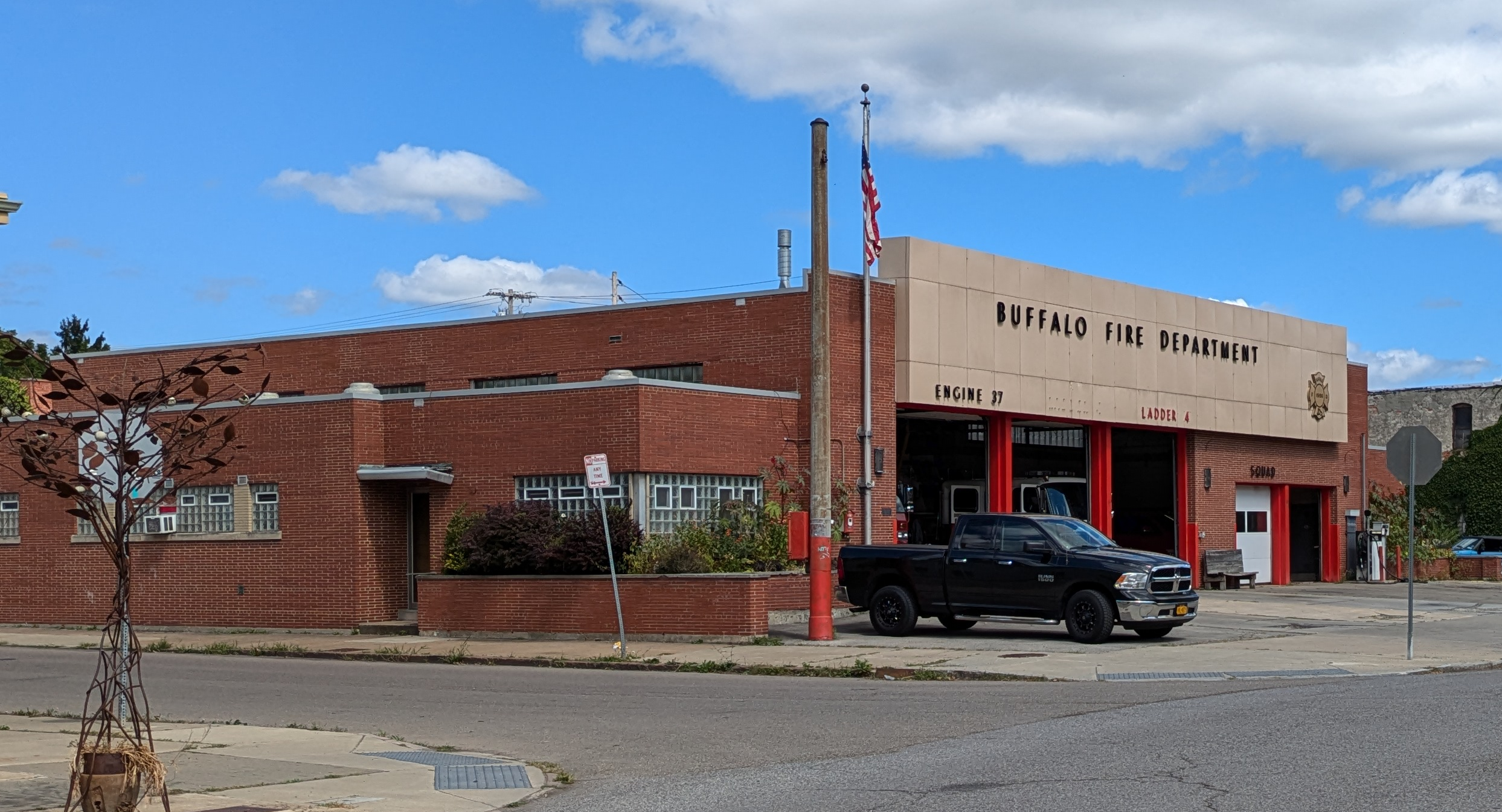
Fire station 37

As of October 2023, the Buffalo Fire Department operates out of nineteen fire stations with 1 Division Chief and 4 Battalion Chiefs.

Station #	Address	Engine company	Truck company	Special unit	Chief Unit	
1	132 Ellicott St.	Engine 1	Ladder 2	Water Rescue Unit		
2	376 Virginia St.	Engine 2		Safety Lieutenant F40		B56 (Division Chief)
3	601 Broadway	Engine 3		Haz-Mat 1	B43 (3rd Battalion Chief)	
4	939 Abbott Rd.	Engine 4				
19	209 Forest Ave.	Engine 19				
20	155 Ohio St.	Engine 20		Edward M. Cotter Fireboat		
21	1229 Jefferson Ave.	Engine 21	Ladder 6	Rescue 1, Collapse/Technical Rescue Unit		
22	1528 Broadway	Engine 22				
23	3226 Bailey Ave.	Engine 23				
25	1731 Seneca St.	Engine 25	Ladder 10		B46 (6th Battalion Chief)	
26	703 Tonawanda St.	Engine 26				
28	1170 E. Lovejoy St.	Engine 28				
31	2044 Bailey Ave.	Engine 31	Ladder 14	Haz-Mat. Spill/Decon. unit		
32 Larkinville	700 Seneca St.	Engine 32	Ladder 5			
33	1720 Filmore Ave.	Engine 33		Rehab Unit		
34	2837 Main St.	Engine 34	Ladder 7			
35	1512 Clinton St.	Engine 35	Ladder 15			
36	860 Hertel Ave.	Engine 36	Ladder 13			
37	500 Rhode Island St.	Engine 37	Ladder 4		B44 (4th Battalion Chief)	
38	398 Linden Ave.	Engine 38			B47 (7th Battalion Chief)	

- All truck companies in the BFD are tower ladders with the exception of Ladder 15

=== Disbanded fire companies ===
There have been multiple fire companies disbanded throughout the history of the Buffalo Fire Department due to budget cuts or department reorganization.

- Engine 5 – Emsile & Bristol (torn down)
- Engine 6 – Originally located at 700 Seneca St then moved to Smith & Fulton (torn down)
- Engine 7 – Lower Terrace & Evans St. (torn down)
- Engine 7 - Buffalo Niagara International Airport (Taken over by NFTA 1982)
- Engine 8 – Chicago St. torn down E-8 relocated to L-8
- Engine 9 – 707 Washington St. – disbanded 1978
- Engine 10 – 30 Ganson St. – disbanded 2003
- Engine 11 – 1195 Niagara St.
- Engine 12 – 132 Ellicott St. – disbanded December 1, 1954
- Engine 13 – 195 Court St. – disbanded July 1, 1994
- Engine 14 – William St. & Casey St. (torn down)
- Engine 15 – Original house torn down at Amherst & Thompson 64 Amherst St.
- Engine 16 – 1420 Main St. / 1229 Jefferson Ave. – disbanded July 1st, 2002
- Engine 17 – Rhode Island & Chenango (parking lot of current E-37)
- Engine 18 – 1032 Fillmore Ave. – disbanded/reinstated 1982, reinstated March 1983 – disbanded permanently 2002
- Engine 23 - Marine Unit Reopened as Engine 23 land unit
- Engine 24 – 110 Leroy Ave.
- Engine 27 – 33 Johnson St. (torn down) – disbanded 1978 to form Rescue 1
- Engine 29 (Marine unit) – 315 Ganson St. (torn down)
- Engine 30 – Original quarters South Park and Whitfield. Moved to Ladder 10's quarters at Southside and Mesmer, then moved to 517 Southside Pkwy. disbanded/reinstated 1982 – disbanded permanently 1994
- Ladder 1 – 707 Washington St. disbanded 1994
- Ladder 3 – 303 Spring St. (torn down)
- Ladder 8 – Original house on Chicago St still standing 315 Ganson St. – disbanded 1976
- Ladder 9 – 376 Virginia St. – disbanded March 2004
- Ladder 11 – 636 Fillmore Ave. Disbanded November 2003
- Ladder 12 – 395 Amherst St.
- Ladder 16 – 939 Abbott Rd. – disbanded 1976
- Snorkel 1 - 195 Court St.
- Rescue 2 – Rhode Island & Chenango St. disbanded 1994
- Rescue 3 – 33 Johnson St. Was a two-piece company with Engine 27, not a company, Engine 27 was closed to establish Rescue 1
- B41 (Battalion 1) – 132 Ellicott St. – now the Platoon Safety Chief, operates out of 195 Court
- B42 (Battalion 2) – 707 Washington St. – now the Training Bureau Chief, operates out of Buffalo Fire Training Academy on Broadway in Cheektowaga
- B45 (Battalion 5) – 273 Kehr St. - now the Special Operations Battalion Chief, operates out of SOC at 195 Court St
- B55 South Division Chief – 700 Seneca St. now Division Chief of Special Operations, operates out of SOC 195 Court St.

Squads were Second Piece to Host Engine Co.

- Squad 1 – 132 Ellicott St.
- Squad 2 – 517 Southside Pkwy.
- Squad 3 – 33 Johnson St., was Heavy Rescue Squad 3, With E27, disbanded to create Rescue 1
- Squad 4 – 2025 Bailey Ave.
- Squad 5 – 500 Rhode Island St.
- Squad 6 – 110 Leroy Ave.
- Squad 7 – 64 Amherst St.
- Squad 8 – 700 Seneca St.
- Squad 9 – 707 Washington St.
- Squad 10 – 1032 Fillmore Ave. permanently manned 1972-75
- Squad 11 – 310 Jersey St. permanently manned 1972-75
- Quad 6 – 131 Southside Pkwy. was a combination of Engine Co. 6 and Ladder 10.
- Chemical 1 - 9 Franklin St
- Chemical 2 - 416 Chicago St
- Chemical 3 - 498 Pearl St
- Chemical 4 _ 146 High St
- Chemical 5 – 166 Cleveland Ave.
- Chemical 6- 528 Broadway
- Chemical 7 - Pan American Exposition
- Water Tower 1 – 195 Court St.
- Water Tower 2 – 195 Court St.
