= Ryan Taughrin =

American politician

Member-elect of the New York State Assembly from the 143rd district
- Incumbent
- Assumed office January 13, 2027

Personal details
- Born: July 1987 (age 39) Cheektowaga
- Party: Democratic
- Spouse: Holly Taughrin

Ryan J. Taughrin (born July 27, 1987) is a member-elect of the New York State Assembly, elected in 2026. He was elected to the 143rd district, which includes parts of Cheektowaga, Lancaster, Sloan, Depew, and Buffalo, New York. A registered Democrat, Taughrin will caucus with the Democratic majority in the Assembly.

== Early life, family, and career ==
Taughrin was born in Cheektowaga, New York. He graduated from SUNY Fredonia with a Bachelor of Science and University at Buffalo with a Masters in Higher Education. He is currently working on his PhD in Higher Education at UB. He is an Assistant Dean for Enrollment Management at UB.

Taughrin is married to Holly Taughrin. They have two daughters.

In 2017, Taughrin unsuccessfully ran for the West Seneca Central School District board of education.

In 2025, Taughrin was elected to the Lancaster Public Library Board of Trustees.

== New York State Assembly ==
=== 2026 election ===
In the 2026 election, Taughrin ran for the 143rd State Assembly seat held by Patrick Chludzinski. The race was called for Taughrin on November 10 when Chludzinski conceded the race on social media.
