= Maryvale High School =

Maryvale High School may refer to

- Maryvale High School (Cheektowaga, New York)
- Maryvale High School (Phoenix, Arizona)
