= Patrick Chludzinski =

American politician

Member of the New York State Assembly from the 143rd district
- Incumbent
- Assumed office January 1, 2025
- Preceded by: Monica P. Wallace

Personal details
- Party: Republican
- Website: Campaign website Official website

Patrick J. Chludzinski is an American politician from the state of New York. A Republican, Chludzinski was elected to the New York State Assembly for the 143rd district in 2024. The district comprises the Western New York towns of Cheektowaga and Lancaster.

Running on the Republican and Conservative Party lines, Chludzinski defeated incumbent Democrat Monica Wallace in 2024. Wallace had held the seat since 2017. He ran for re-election in 2026, but lost to Democrat Ryan Taughrin.

Chludzinski is a veteran of the United States Army and a former law enforcement official.
