= Kevin Jobity Jr. =

American football player (born 2003)

No. 92 – Pittsburgh Steelers
- Position: Defensive end
- Roster status: Active

Personal information
- Born: October 6, 2003 (age 23); Buffalo, New York, U.S.
- Listed height: 6 ft 4 in (1.93 m)
- Listed weight: 300 lb (136 kg)

Career information
- High school: Maryvale (Cheektowaga, New York)
- College: Syracuse (2022–2025)
- NFL draft: 2026: undrafted

Career history
- Pittsburgh Steelers (2026–present)

Career NFL statistics as of Week 8, 2026
- Total tackles: 1
- Sacks: 1
- Stats at Pro Football Reference

Kevin Jobity Jr. (born October 6, 2003) is an American football defensive end for the Pittsburgh Steelers of the National Football League (NFL). He played college football for the Syracuse Orange.

== Early life ==
A three-letter (soccer, basketball, football) athlete and member of the National Honor Society, Jobity Jr. graduated from Maryvale High School in Cheektowaga, New York. After playing only one full season of football and receiving 24 NCAA Division I offers, including Yale, Harvard, Colgate, and Army, he committed to play college football for the Syracuse Orange.

== College career ==
As a freshman in 2022, Jobity Jr. recorded 13 tackles with four and a half going for a loss, and two sacks. In 2023, he totaled 31 tackles with seven and a half being for a loss. In 2024 Jobity Jr., only played in five games due to injury, recording ten tackles with two and a half going for a loss. In week 8 of the 2025 season, Jobity Jr. notched three sacks in a loss versus Pittsburgh, earning ACC defensive lineman of the week honors. He finished the 2025 season with 30 tackles and five sacks.

== Professional career ==
Pre-draft measurables
Height	Weight	Arm length	Hand span	Wingspan	40-yard dash	10-yard split	20-yard split	20-yard shuttle	Three-cone drill	Vertical jump	Broad jump	Bench press
6 ft 4 1/2 in (1.94 m)	308 lb (140 kg)	33 1/4 in (0.84 m)	10 in (0.25 m)	6 ft 8 7/8 in (2.05 m)	5.05 s	1.69 s	2.88 s	4.64 s	7.59 s	32.0 in (0.81 m)	8 ft 8 in (2.64 m)	22 reps
All values from Pro Day

After not being selected in the 2026 NFL draft, Jobity Jr. signed with the Pittsburgh Steelers as an undrafted free agent.

== Personal life ==
Jobity Jr. is the son of Robyn E. Jobity and former professional basketball center, Kevin Jobity Sr.
