= Garrison Cemetery =

Garrison Cemetery may refer to:

Canada

- Garrison Cemetery (Annapolis Royal, Nova Scotia)

Denmark

- Garrison Cemetery, Copenhagen

United States

- Garrison Cemetery (Cheektowaga, New York), property listed on the National Register of Historic Places in Erie County, New York
