= Monica P. Wallace =

American politician and attorney

Member of the New York State Assembly from the 143rd district
- In office January 1, 2017 – December 31, 2024
- Preceded by: Angela Wozniak
- Succeeded by: Patrick Chludzinski

Personal details
- Party: Democratic
- Education: SUNY Binghamton (BA); University at Buffalo (JD)
- Website: Campaign website

Monica Piga Wallace is a politician from New York State. A Democrat, Wallace was elected to the New York State Assembly from the 143rd Assembly District in 2016. The district comprised the entirety of the towns of Cheektowaga and Lancaster. Wallace was elected to succeed Conservative party politician Angela Wozniak, who did not seek re-election.

In the 2024 New York State Assembly election, Wallace was unseated by Republican Patrick Chludzinski.

Political offices
Preceded by Angela Wozniak	New York Assembly, 143rd District; 2017–2024	Succeeded by Patrick Chludzinski
