= New York's 143rd State Assembly district =

American legislative district

Assemblymember
Patrick Chludzinski; R–Cheektowaga

New York's 143rd State Assembly district is one of the 150 districts in the New York State Assembly. It is represented by Democrat Ryan Taughrin. It was previously represented by Democrat Monica Wallace since 2017.

== Geography ==
As of 2022, the 143rd Assembly District is located entirely within Erie County. It contains parts of Buffalo's Ellicott, Fillmore, and Lovejoy wards, as well as the entire town of Cheektowaga, and part of the town of Lancaster. Buffalo Niagara International Airport is located in this district.

=== 2010s ===
District 143 is located entirely within Erie County. It contains towns east of Buffalo, such as Cheektowaga and Lancaster.

== Recent election results ==
=== 2026 ===
2026 New York State Assembly election, District 143
Party	Candidate	Votes	%
Republican	Patrick Chludzinski		
Conservative	Patrick Chludzinski		
Total	Patrick Chludzinski (incumbent)		
Democratic	Ryan Taughrin		
Working Families	Ryan Taughrin		
Total	Ryan Taughrin		
Write-in			
Total votes			

=== 2024 ===
2024 New York State Assembly election, District 143
Party	Candidate	Votes	%
Republican	Patrick Chludzinski	25,802	
Conservative	Patrick Chludzinski	4,607	
Total	Patrick Chludzinski	30,409	51.8
Democratic	Monica Wallace	26,176	
Working Families	Monica Wallace	2,032	
Total	Monica Wallace (incumbent)	28,208	48.1
Write-in		64	0.1
Total votes		58,681	100.0
Republican gain from Democratic			

=== 2022 ===
2022 New York State Assembly election, District 143
Party	Candidate	Votes	%
Democratic	Monica Wallace	21,385	
Integrity	Monica Wallace	420	
Total	Monica Wallace (incumbent)	22,255	52.6
Republican	Frank Smerciak II	15,861	
Conservative	Frank Smerciak II	4,174	
Total	Frank Smerciak II	20,035	47.4
Write-in		20	0.0
Total votes		42,310	100.0
Democratic hold			

=== 2020 ===
2020 New York State Assembly election, District 143
Party	Candidate	Votes	%
Democratic	Monica Wallace	31,187	
Working Families	Monica Wallace	2,975	
Independence	Monica Wallace	1,047	
Total	Monica Wallace (incumbent)	35,209	52.4
Republican	Frank Smerciak II	26,968	
Conservative	Frank Smerciak II	4,927	
Total	Frank Smerciak II	31,895	47.5
Write-in		63	0.1
Total votes		67,167	100.0
Democratic hold			

=== 2018 ===
2018 New York State Assembly election, District 143
Party	Candidate	Votes	%
Democratic	Monica Wallace	23,903	
Working Families	Monica Wallace	1,240	
Independence	Monica Wallace	1,094	
Women's Equality	Monica Wallace	460	
Total	Monica Wallace (incumbent)	26,697	58.1
Republican	Daniel Centinello Sr.	19,246	41.9
Write-in		0	0.0
Total votes		45,943	100.0
Democratic hold			

=== 2016 ===
2016 New York State Assembly election, District 143
Primary election
Party	Candidate	Votes	%
Democratic	Monica Wallace	4,430	74.8
Democratic	Kristy Mazurek	1,496	25.2
Write-in		0	0.0
Total votes		5,926	100
General election
Democratic	Monica Wallace	27,738	
Working Families	Monica Wallace	2,473	
Women's Equality	Monica Wallace	666	
Total	Monica Wallace	30,877	55.0
Republican	Russell Sugg	19,262	
Conservative	Russell Sugg	4,605	
Independence	Russell Sugg	1,210	
Reform	Russell Sugg	176	
Total	Russell Sugg	25,253	45.0
Write-in		0	0.0
Total votes		56,130	100.0
Democratic gain from Conservative			

=== 2014 ===
2014 New York State Assembly election, District 143
Primary election
Party	Candidate	Votes	%
Democratic	Mark Mazurek	4,435	53.8
Democratic	Camille Brandon	3,804	46.2
Write-in		0	0.0
Total votes		8,239	100
General election
Republican	Angela Wozniak	13,608	
Conservative	Angela Wozniak	4,055	
Independence	Angela Wozniak	1,881	
Total	Angela Wozniak	19,544	59.3
Democratic	Mark Mazurek	11,891	36.0
Working Families	Camille Brandon	1,546	4.7
Write-in		0	0.0
Total votes		32,981	100.0
Conservative gain from Democratic			

=== 2012 ===
2012 New York State Assembly election, District 143
Party	Candidate	Votes	%
Democratic	Dennis Gabryszak	32,372	
Conservative	Dennis Gabryszak	4,563	
Independence	Dennis Gabryszak	2,577	
Total	Dennis Gabryszak (incumbent)	39,512	72.3
Republican	Frank DeCarlo	12,884	23.7
Write-in		0	0.0
Total votes		54,314	100.0
Democratic hold			

=== 2010 ===
2010 New York State Assembly election, District 143
Party	Candidate	Votes	%
Democratic	Dennis Gabryszak	20,839	
Conservative	Dennis Gabryszak	2,326	
Independence	Dennis Gabryszak	2,236	
Working Families	Dennis Gabryszak	1,531	
Total	Dennis Gabryszak (incumbent)	26,932	65.6
Republican	Patrick Mandia	14,107	34.4
Write-in		0	0.0
Total votes		41,039	100.0
Democratic hold			
