= Sexual Harassment Working Group =

Sexual Harassment

The Sexual Harassment Working Group (SHWG) is a collective formed in 2018 by seven former New York State Legislature employees who experienced, witnessed, or reported sexual harassment by former New York State legislators and their staff.

The SHWG advocates for improved worker protections relating to sexual harassment and gender discrimination. The group is non-partisan, does not endorse nor support any elected officials or candidates for public office, and does not receive any lobbying funds.

== Employment in the New York State Legislature ==
The seven co-founding members of the SHWG are Elizabeth Crothers, Eliyanna Kaiser, Danielle Bennett, Leah Hebert, Rita Pasarell, Tori Burhans, and Erica Vladimer. Elias Farah joined the SHWG in 2019. All SHWG members worked in the New York State legislature during dates ranging from 2000–2012, and alleged various forms of sexual harassment by supervisors or coworkers, including former Counsel to Speaker Sheldon Silver, Michael Boxley, former Assembly members Vito J. Lopez, Micah Kellner, Angela Wozniak, and Senator Jeff Klein.

=== 2001 - New York State Assembly Receives Report of Rape by Michael Boxley ===
In 2001, Elizabeth Crothers was employed by the New York State Assembly, and reported to then-New York State Assembly Speaker Sheldon Silver that Silver's counsel, Micheal Boxley, had raped Ms. Crothers. At the time, "after listening to the accusation against [Boxley], [Silver] issued a statement saying [Boxley] was innocent." Silver then oversaw the investigation into Boxley's conduct, and the internal Assembly investigation was terminated without any finding of guilt or innocence. Two years later, Boxley was charged with raping another Assembly staff member, and Boxley plead guilty to sexual misconduct. In 2011, the firm Brown & Weinraub hired Boxley as a lobbyist. Of the hire, New York State Senator Liz Krueger had stated “I was appalled at the time that Boxley was allowed to stay in the Assembly after the first reported incident ...The fact that he can return as a lobbyist reflects the incestuous relationship in Albany between the Legislature and the lobbying firms.”

In 2018, in the midst of national attention to the "#MeToo" movement, Boxley left the firm, although the firm spokesperson "insisted Boxley's departure had nothing to do with recent media coverage of the lobbyist's past that has appeared in the months since the fall of studio mogul Harvey Weinstein precipitated the #MeToo movement calling out sexual abuse and harassment by powerful men."

=== 2009 - New York State Assembly Receives Report of Sexual Harassment by Assemblymember Micah Kellner ===
In 2009, Danielle Bennett was an employee in the office of Assemblymember Micah Kellner, and Danielle reported that Assemblymember Micah Kellner had been sexually harassing her and sending her sexual messages.

=== December 2011 - New York State Assembly Receives Reports of Sexual Harassment by Assemblymember Vito J. Lopez ===
In December 2011, Leah Hebert was an employee in the district office of Assemblymember Vito Lopez, and Leah reported to the New York State Assembly Office of Counsel for the Assembly Majority that Assemblymember Vito Lopez had sexually harasser her and other staff. Later that same month, Rita Pasarell, another employee in Lopez' district office, also reported Lopez' sexual harassment to the New York State Assembly Office of Counsel for the Assembly Majority. In violation of the Assembly policy in place at the time, the complaints were not referred promptly to the Assembly Ethics Committee for an investigation, there was no investigation into the allegations, nor were there any other measures taken to protect Lopez’s remaining staff.

=== August 2012 - New York State Assembly Standing Committee on Ethics and Guidance Report Regarding Assemblymember Vito J. Lopez ===
On August 24, 2012, the Assembly Standing Committee on Ethics and Guidance issued a report which concluded that Assemblymember Lopez had engaged in repeated conduct toward two additional former female staff members that violated the Assembly’s Sexual Harassment and Retaliation Policy. The former staff members were employees hired after Leah Hebert and Rita Pasarell were removed from Lopez' office. Then-Speaker Sheldon Silver removed Lopez from his position as Chair of the Assembly Standing Committee on Housing.

=== February 2013 - JCOPE Report on Assemblymember Lopez ===
In February 2013, the New York State Joint Commission on Public Ethics found that:

"Based upon the evidence developed through the investigation, the Commission finds that Lopez used the powers and perks of his position as a member of the Assembly to engage in knowing, willful, and prolonged mistreatment of certain female members of his Assembly staff. Lopez engaged in a pervasive pattern of abuse of public office and resources, not for a personal financial gain, but to indulge his personal whims and desires. By this conduct, Lopez indisputably breached the public trust and thereby violated the Public Officers Law."

=== 2015 - New York State Assemblymember Angela Wozniak ===
In 2015, Elias Farah was an employee in the office of Assemblymember Angela Wozniak. In 2016, the Assembly Ethics and Guidance Committee found that "Ms. Wozniak pursued the staff member even after he asked to break things off. Ms. Wozniak eventually told her husband about the affair and banned the staff member from working in her district office or attending community meetings where she would be, the committee reported. When he filed a complaint about Ms. Wozniak’s behavior, it said, she disparaged him to someone whom he had asked to serve as a job reference. The investigation also found that she had broken the Assembly’s retaliation rules when her lawyer identified her accuser to the press."

=== March 2015 - New York State Senator Jeff Klein ===
In March 2015, Erica Vladimer was an employee of the Independent Democratic Conference, which was led by State Senator Jeff Klein. In 2018, she spoke out about how during a gathering celebrating the passage of the state budget, "Klein forcibly kissed her in 2015 while he stood outside an Albany bar for a smoke."

=== Formation of SHWG ===
On March 22, 2018 the Sexual Harassment Working Group released a statement which noted “We have come together for the first time to raise our collective voice as people who have experienced and/or reported sexual harassment in the New York State Legislature.”

At the time, the group publicly urged the New York State Legislature and Governor Andrew Cuomo to "postpone addressing workplace harassment until after the budget negotiation is completed" explaining that "Some of the bills currently under consideration by the Legislature cut back on the rights of workers, instead of increasing protections ... Lawmakers should not rush through bills as part of the budget supposedly in the name of standing up for survivors — that’s not progress, it’s a pat on the back."

In April 2018, New York State passed laws related to sexual harassment, and SHWG "criticized the Democratic governor and bi-partisan Legislature for passing an inadequate package of anti-sexual harassment legislation" while noting "the legislation that was passed would not have changed anything that happened to any of us in the working group."

=== Advocacy ===
In June 2018, the SHWG released its first report: "Fixing Albany's #MeToo Problem: What's Next? Policy Recommendations to Protect Employees of Elected and Appointed Officials from Gender-Based Discrimination and Harassment." The report notes policy and legislative changes in three basic categories:

1. Strengthen Statewide Legal Definitions Related to Gender-Based Discrimination and Harassment
2. Reform and Appropriately Fund a Truly Independent New York State Division of Human Rights
3. Increase Protections for Victims Seeking Redress

After releasing its report, the SHWG campaigned to raise the profile of sexual harassment in several New York State races, and began to call for public hearings to help guide future legislation. In July 2018, Attorney General candidate Zephyr Teachout and Gubernatorial candidate Cynthia Nixon were the first candidates to join the SHWG in its call for public hearings on sexual harassment.

=== New York State Joint Legislative Hearings on Sexual Harassment ===
On February 19, 2019, New York State held the first joint legislative public hearing on sexual harassment since 1992. Press credited the SHWG as having been a major factor in bringing about the hearing, stating that "Albany lawmakers held the first hearing on sexual harassment in 27 years because seven women would not go away."

The SWHG testified at the hearing, which lasted over 11 hours. On May 24, 2019, there was a second joint public legislative hearing on sexual harassment.

=== 2019 Legislative Advocacy Successes ===
That same year, New York State passed several of the items on the SHWG legislative agenda, including updating state law so that workers who allege sexual harassment will no longer be required to prove that the harassment was "severe or pervasive", an extremely high burden which was nearly impossible for workers to meet. The new law states that employer conduct is discriminatory harassment if it "subjects an individual to inferior terms, conditions or privileges of employment because of the individual’s membership in one or more of these protected categories.”

The bill was sponsored by New York State Senator Alessandra Biaggi and New York State Assemblymember Aravella Simotas. Members of the Sexual Harassment Working Group were invited to watch the passing votes for the bill in the Senate and the Assembly, and several of the lawmakers including the bill sponsors referenced the SWHG in their passage speeches.

Of the new law, one legal publication noted that the change was akin to "1,000 tons of TNT" and that "Clichés like 'seismic shift' and 'paradigm change' do not begin to describe just how profoundly the New York legislature changed the standards for harassment claims"

=== Current Activities ===
The SHWG is now advocating for its six-item 2022 legislative agenda, which includes bills which would accomplish the following:

- Eliminate the "license to harass" by codifying that under the New York State Human Rights Law, staff of elected and appointed officials are employees of the governmental entity(ies) for which they work, whether it is New York State, or a city, county or municipality
- Prevent sexual harassment or discrimination settlement agreements from including provisions that force victims to pay a specified amount in damages upon their violation of a non-disclosure agreement
- Extend the statute of limitations for discrimination lawsuits to six years
- Ban "no-rehire" clauses in workplace settlement agreements
- Require people registered as lobbyist with New York State to take an annual online anti-sexual harassment training
- Amend state whistleblower law to ensure that legislative and judicial staff who report violations of law or other improper conduct are not retaliated against or subject to disciplinary action

The state senate has passed the first five-listed bills, but none have passed the state Assembly.

=== Publications ===
"Fixing Albany's #MeToo Problem: What's Next? Policy Recommendations to Protect Employees of Elected and Appointed Officials from Gender-Based Discrimination and Harassment."

=== Reception ===
In 2018, City & State New York named Erica Vladimer in its "2018 Manhattan Watch List," noting "Vladimer has become much more than a publicly known victim. She has established herself as a leading voice in the #MeToo movement and helped establish the Sexual Harassment Working Group."

In February 2019, following the New York State Joint Legislative Hearing on Sexual Harassment, City & State New York named the SHWG as one of the "week's biggest winners."

In November 2021, City & State New York named Elizabeth Crothers, Leah Hebert, Rita Pasarell, and Erica Vladimer to "The Power of Diversity: Women 100" list, which "recognizes the prominent women wielding power across New York state."
