= Kristina Fargo =

American politician

Member of the New Hampshire House of Representatives from the Strafford 14th district
- Incumbent
- Assumed office December 5, 2018
- Preceded by: Hamilton R. Krans Jr.

Personal details
- Party: Democratic
- Education: Maryvale High School; University at Buffalo

Kristina Fargo is a New Hampshire politician.

== Education ==
Fargo graduated from Maryvale High School. In 1985, Fargo earned a BS in business management from the University at Buffalo.

== Career ==
Fargo worked as an IT professional for Liberty Mutual for 23 years, retiring in 2011. On November 6, 2018, Fargo was elected to the New Hampshire House of Representatives where she represents the Strafford 14 district. She assumed office on December 5, 2018. She is a Democrat.

== Personal life ==
Fargo resides in Dover, New Hampshire. Fargo is married and has two children.
