= Doyle New York =

American auction house and appraiser

Coordinates: 40°46′47.27″N 73°57′14.09″W

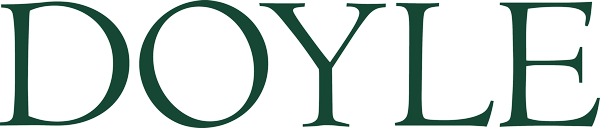

- Founded: 1962
- Founder: William Doyle
- Website: doylenewyork.com

Doyle New York is an American auction house and appraiser of fine art, jewelry, furniture, decorations and other items. It offers auctions throughout the year at its premises on the Upper East Side of Manhattan.

The firm was founded in 1962 by the late William Doyle as William Doyle Antiques. In 1973, it was incorporated as William Doyle Galleries, Inc. By 1979, the auction house was making about $12 million a year in sales. Since 2001, it has been doing business as Doyle, New York.

Over the years, Doyle has conducted significant estate auctions for a variety of prominent figures, including royalty, celebrities, renowned musicians, and Hollywood icons such as Lady Sarah Consuelo Spencer-Churchill, Louis Armstrong, Bette Davis, James Cagney, and Douglas Fairbanks. Additionally, the auction house has worked with distinguished institutions, including Columbia University and the Metropolitan Museum of Art, offering auction and appraisal services for their collections.

In 2013, the company auctioned the furniture and art collection of Edward Koch, former mayor of New York City.

One of the most popular auctions is the Dogs in Art & Sporting Art held annually in the same week as the famous Westminster Kennel Club Dog Show.
