= Hamilton R. Krans Jr. =

American politician (1944–2025)

Attorney of Strafford County, New Hampshire
- In office 1975–1979

Member of the New Hampshire House of Representatives from the Strafford 14th district
- In office December 7, 2016 – December 4, 2018
- Preceded by: Bill Baber
- Succeeded by: Kristina Fargo

Personal details
- Born: Hamilton Richey Krans Jr. February 21, 1944 Middletown, New York, U.S.
- Died: June 8, 2025 (aged 81) Dover, New Hampshire, U.S.
- Party: Republican; Democratic
- Education: Dartmouth College; University of Miami School of Law

Hamilton Richey Krans Jr. (February 21, 1944 – June 8, 2025) was an American politician. A member of the Republican Party and the Democratic Party, he served as attorney of Strafford County, New Hampshire from 1975 to 1979 and in the New Hampshire House of Representatives from 2016 to 2018.

== Life and career ==
Krans was born in Middletown, New York, the son of Hamilton Krans Sr. and Eulalia Padgett Eastman. He attended Dartmouth College, graduating in 1966. After graduating, he attended the University of Miami School of Law, earning his juris doctor degree in 1969, which after earning his degree, he served in the United States Army and in the New Hampshire Army National Guard.

Krans served as attorney of Strafford County, New Hampshire from 1975 to 1979. After his service as attorney, he served in the New Hampshire House of Representatives from 2016 to 2018.

Krans died in Dover, New Hampshire on June 8, 2025, at the age of 81.
