= Pine Hill, Erie County, New York =

Hamlet in New York, United States

Coordinates: 42°55′12″N 78°47′36″W

Pine Hill is a hamlet in the town of Cheektowaga in Erie County, New York, United States. It is around Pine Hill Ridge Rd and Genesee St
