= Doyle, New York =

Hamlet in New York, United States

Coordinates: 42°52′46″N 78°47′05″W

Doyle is a hamlet in the town of Cheektowaga in Erie County, New York, United States. The southern half is part of the Kaisertown neighborhood, which includes portions of Cheektowaga, West Seneca, and South Buffalo. Doyle is south of Sloan, east of Bailey Ave, North of the Buffalo River, and west of Union Rd. Doyle is home to busy streets such as Harlem Rd, and Dingens St. Doyle is home to the Doyle 1 and 2 Fire Departments. It is almost entirely in the Cheektowaga-Sloan Union Free School District, meanwhile some of it is part of Buffalo Public Schools.
