= Forks, New York =

- Hamlet
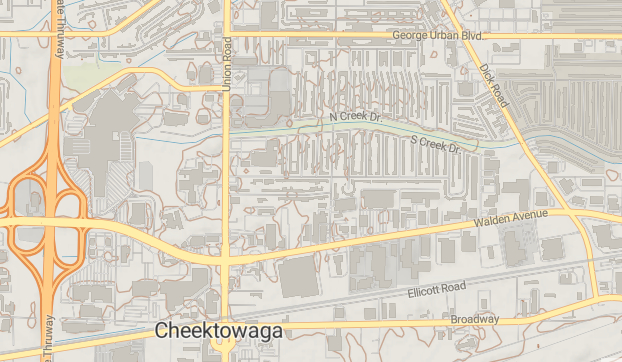
- Forks
- Interactive map of Forks, New York
- Coordinates: 42°54′14″N 78°45′15″W
- Country: United States
- State: New York
- County: Erie
- Town: Cheektowaga
- Time zone: UTC-5 (EST)
  - Summer (DST): UTC-4 (EDT)
- Area code: 716

Forks is a hamlet in the town of Cheektowaga in Erie County, New York, United States. surrounded by George Urban Blvd, Dick Rd, Union Rd and Broadway St.

Forks is the site of what was once one of the largest coal trestles in the United States, over half a mile long, which was built in the 1880s and burned in the 1920s.

The Forks Hotel on Broadway St. was built in 1853 along the new Attica & Buffalo Railroad. The building served variously as a hotel, railroad station, post office and bar. In 1958 it was purchased by local magician Eddie Fechter, who operated it as a venue for magic shows. Fechter died in the late 1970s, and the hotel was sold, but continued to hold magic shows. The building was damaged by fire in 1998 and demolished in 2003.
