= November 13–21, 2014 North American winter storm =

Severe winter storm

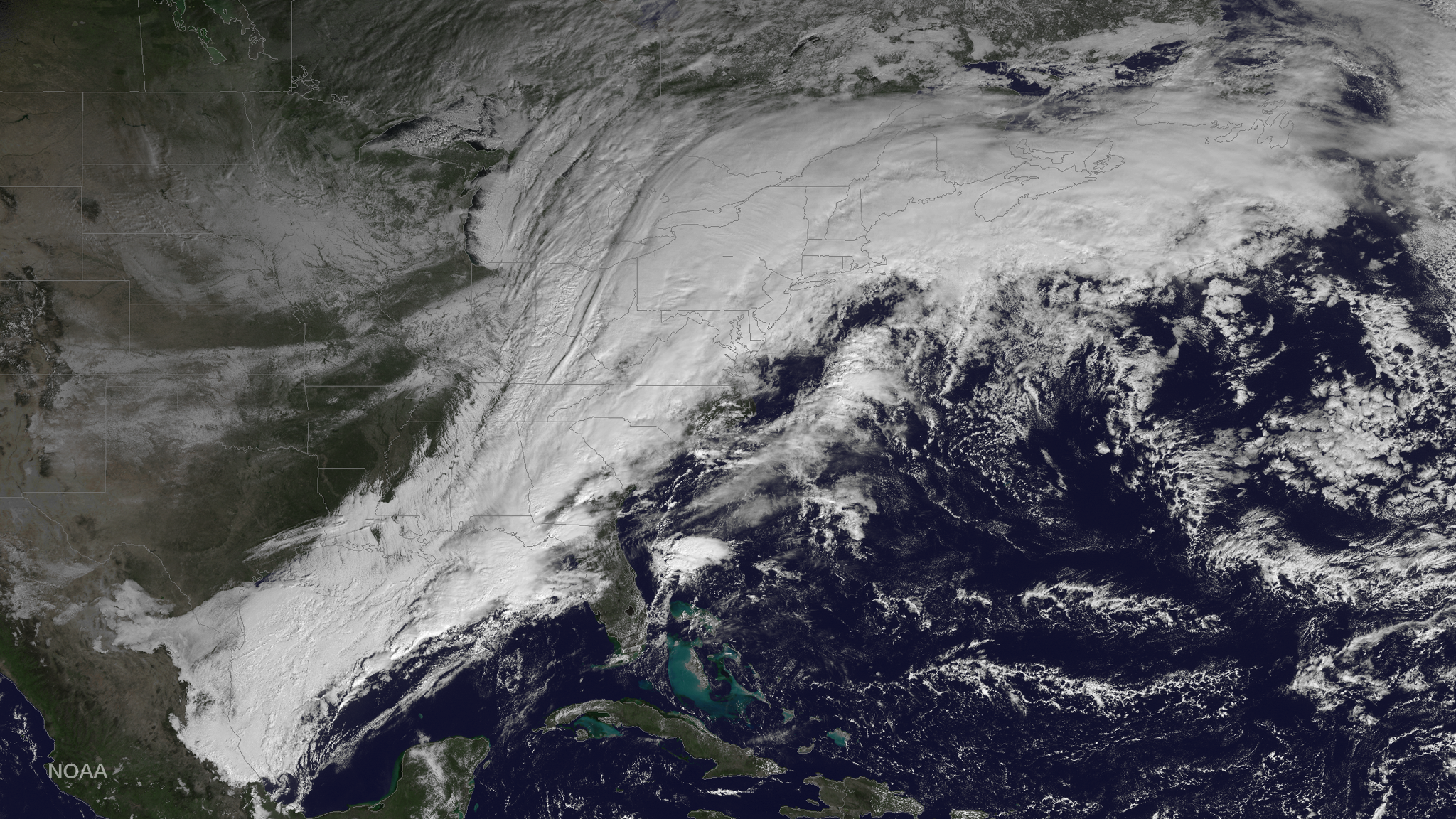
- Satellite image of the winter storm on November 17

Meteorological history
- Formed: November 13, 2014
- Exited land: November 21, 2014
- Dissipated: November 26, 2014

Extratropical cyclone
- Lowest pressure: 961 mb (28.38 inHg)
- Max. snowfall: 88 in (223.52 cm) in Wyoming County, New York

Overall effects
- Fatalities: At least 24
- Damage: $46 million (2014 USD)
- Areas affected: Pacific Northwest, Central United States, Eastern United States, Northern Mexico, Eastern Canada, Southern Greenland, Iceland
- Part of the 2014–15 North American winter

A potent winter storm and particularly severe lake-effect snowstorm, given the code name Knife by local governments and colloquially nicknamed Snow-vember) affected the United States from November 13–21, 2014. Originating from the Pacific Northwest on November 13, which brought copious amounts of lake-effect snow to the Central US and New England from November 15 until November 21, when the system departed the East Coast of the United States. The snowstorm elicited an enormous response from emergency crews and the National Guard, requiring more manpower than any other snowstorm in the history of New York state, as it buried cars and stranded thousands of people in their homes in Western New York. Eight months after the storm, the snow's remnants still remained in Buffalo, New York.

== Meteorological history ==
The winter storm was associated with the November 2014 North American cold wave. On Thursday, November 13, an extratropical disturbance developed just off the shore of southern Oregon, at the end of an occluded front. Early on Friday, November 14, the system fully moved ashore in the Pacific Northwest and began bringing snowfall to the region. The winter storm quickly moved southeastward and then northeastward, triggering large amounts of lake-effect snow near the Great Lakes beginning on Sunday, November 16. On November 16, Lake Erie had a water temperature of 48 °F (9 °C). On Monday, November 17, the system reached Western New York, triggering large amounts of lake-effect snow there as well. The air crossing over the lake by the evening of November 17 was −14 °C (7 °F) at 850 hectopascals at the eastern end of the lake and even colder at its western end; this lapse rate was nearly double that of the dry adiabatic lapse rate and resulted in a very unstable atmosphere at the lower levels. The surface and lower-level winds were also well-aligned with the fetch of Lake Erie, favoring the formation of a long, intense band of lake-effect snow, and varied little over the next several days, keeping the band in place over the same areas for an extended period. The event was briefly interrupted by a low-pressure system with general snowfall passing through on Thursday, November 20, before reverting to the same synoptic setup as before.

High pressure and warmer temperatures moved into the area beginning on Friday, November 21, which caused the storm to exit the East Coast, ending the lake-effect snow. The system then quickly began moving northeastward. During the next couple of days, the winter storm eventually intensified, reaching a minimum low pressure of 961 mb (28.38 inHg) on November 23. Later on November 23, the system slowly began to weaken. On November 24, the storm decayed into a disorganized 986 mbar system, after moving just east of southern Greenland. On November 26, 2014, the weakened winter storm was absorbed by another neighboring system to the northwest of Iceland.

== Impact ==
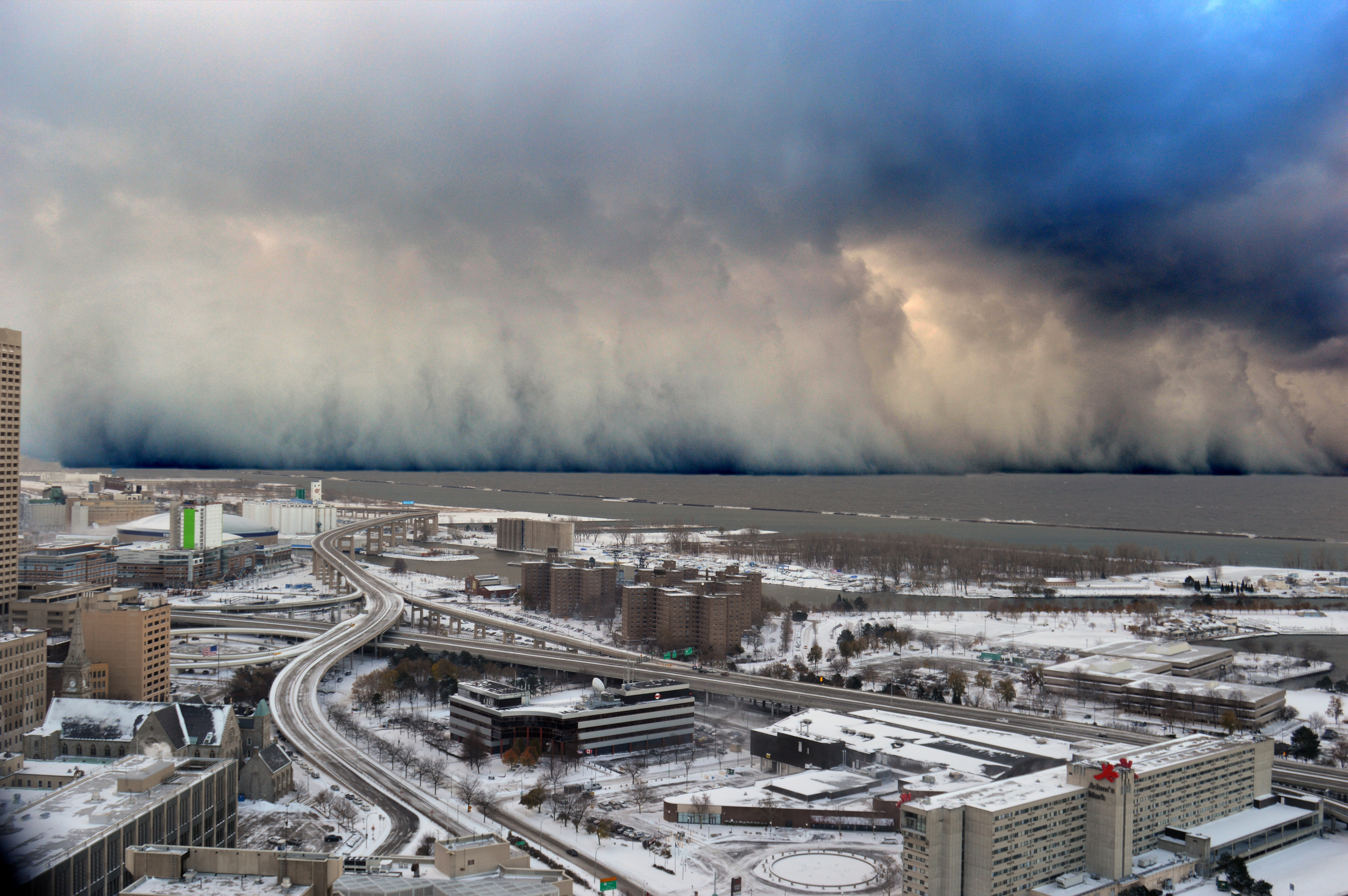
The northern edge of the continuous lake-effect snow band as seen from Downtown Buffalo, New York. The band is moving from right to left in the image, and did not vary much from this location.

Several counties were heavily impacted, with areas in and around Buffalo, New York, particularly the city's southern suburbs, receiving snowfall totals in the range of 5–7 feet (1.5–2.1 m), killing at least 26 people; most of the deaths were caused by heart attacks from overexertion trying to remove the snow. Under the sheer weight of the snow, roofs began collapsing. As the New York State Thruway became impassable, and Amtrak suspended service from Albany to westward destinations like Buffalo, Toronto and Cleveland, many motorists became trapped, including Niagara University's women's basketball team. With a forecast for warmer temperatures and rain, fears of potentially severe flooding due to the melting snow quickly arose. The maximum snowfall recorded from the storm was 88 inches (220 cm) in the hamlet of Cowlesville, in the Town of Bennington in Wyoming County and bordering Erie County.

Radio station WWKB was knocked off the air due to the event, but other radio and television stations were mostly unaffected, as their studios were located outside the snowbelt; those with news bureaus went wall-to-wall with coverage for the entire week and contributed reports to the national networks. WBEN prepared for the event by making sure those of its reporters who lived in the southern suburbs found accommodations north of the city before the event, ensuring they could make it to the station when the storm hit.

Many local school districts in and around Buffalo closed for more than a week in order to remove snow and assess possible damage to property.

=== Snowfall totals ===
The following table displays selected U.S. snowfall totals from November 13–21, 2014:

Note: Click "Show" to view table

| State | City/location | Amount (inches) |
|---|---|---|
| NY | East Aurora | 88 |
| NY | Hamburg | 79.5 |
| NY | West Seneca | 78 |
| NY | Lancaster | 74 |
| NY | Orchard Park | 71 |
| NY | Wales Center | 69.3 |
| NY | South Cheektowaga | 65 |
| NY | Wyoming | 63 |
| NY | Blasdell | 61 |
| NY | Alden | 57.5 |
| NY | Colden | 55 |
| NY | Elma | 51 |
| NY | Corfu | 49 |
| NY | Boston, New York | 48 |
| NY | Marilla | 48 |
| NY | Cowlesville | 47.5 |
| CO | Ouray | 33 |
| WY | Snowy Lake | 32.3 |
| NY | Carthage | 33.4 |
| NY | Redfield | 29 |
| NY | Warsaw | 28.8 |
| NY | Highmarket | 28.6 |
| ID | Vienna Mine | 28.5 |
| NY | Harrisville | 27.8 |
| NY | Theresa | 27.5 |
| NY | Constableville | 27.5 |
| NY | Akron | 26.7 |
| NY | Glenwood | 26.3 |
| NY | Watertown | 24.7 |
| NY | Fredonia | 22.7 |
| NY | Philadelphia, New York | 22 |
| MT | Black Bear ski resort | 21.4 |
| NY | Beaver Falls | 18.5 |
| NY | Stafford | 17.7 |
| NY | Buffalo Niagara International Airport | 16.9 |
| UT | Garden City Summit ski resort | 15.8 |
| WA | White Salmon | 15 |
| NM | Angel Fire and Black Lake | 15 |
| NY | Oswego | 13.1 |
| MN | Lakefield | 8.8 |
| SD | Wall Lake and Herrick | 8 |
| NE | Chadron, Lynch, and Gross | 7 |
| OH | Fryburg | 6.4 |
| IA | Spirit Lake and Graettinger | 6 |
| ID | New Pekin | 6 |
| KY | Walton | 5.3 |
| PA | Stoneboro | 5.3 |
| IL | Salem | 5 |
| OK | Laverne | 4.3 |
| MO | Fenton | 4.3 |
| KS | LeRoy | 4 |
| TX | Hereford and Claude | 4 |
| AR | Quitman, Cave City, and Calamine | 3.5 |
| ME | Jackman | 3.5 |
| VT | Cabot | 2.3 |

=== Sporting events ===
The National Football League's Buffalo Bills, National Hockey League's Buffalo Sabres and University at Buffalo's Buffalo Bulls were forced to postpone games due to the event. The Bills' home stadium, known as Ralph Wilson Stadium at the time, was in the center of the band and because most of the players' homes and the roads around the stadium were impassable, as well as the Stadium itself being snowed in, the National Football League ordered the November 23 game against the New York Jets to be relocated to a neutral site, eventually chosen to be Ford Field in Detroit, Michigan that took place the following night. But the game did not have to move, according to Buffalo Bills Vice President of Operations and Guest Experience, Andy Major. He called for hundreds of volunteers to help shovel out the Stadium, pay $10 an hour plus a free ticket to the game, but after several hours of shoveling, the Stadium was not ready and the game had to be moved The Sabres' home arena, known as First Niagara Center at the time, canceled its November 21 game against the New York Rangers, but went ahead with its November 18 game against the San Jose Sharks, due to the Sharks already being in town and not coming back east until March 2015; the Sharks-Sabres game was played in front of a crowd of 6,200 fans, roughly a third of the arena's capacity. The game against the Rangers was eventually rescheduled for February 20, moving their game against the Ottawa Senators from its originally-scheduled date of February 20 to December 15. The college football game between the University at Buffalo and Kent State University, the penultimate scheduled game for each team that had originally been scheduled for November 19, was initially postponed to November 21 before ultimately being canceled. The cancellation eliminated Buffalo from bowl contention (the team was 4–6 at the time—the team would win their final game to finish 5-6-- but needed a win over Kent State to have a chance at being named to a bowl).

== Response ==
Governor Andrew Cuomo declared a State of Emergency for several counties beginning on November 18. By November 22, parts of Interstate 90 had been reopened, albeit mainly to allow snow removal crews to enter; driving bans remained in effect for multiple areas, however, resulting in gasoline shortages at various stations unable to be refueled. Assistance in cleanup efforts came from a myriad of sources, including the Pennsylvania Department of Transportation; the New York City Fire Department; and the New York National Guard. In general, the region's residents were praised for their ability to withstand the effects of the storm, help others in need and restore normality.

== 2015 births ==
In August 2015, nine months following the November storm, there was a spike in the number of babies born in Buffalo, New York. One hospital reported an increase of six new babies a day to as many as 16, with expectations of a 25 to 30 percent increase in births by the end of the month. Some people in Buffalo had been snowed in for extended periods of time.

== Gallery ==
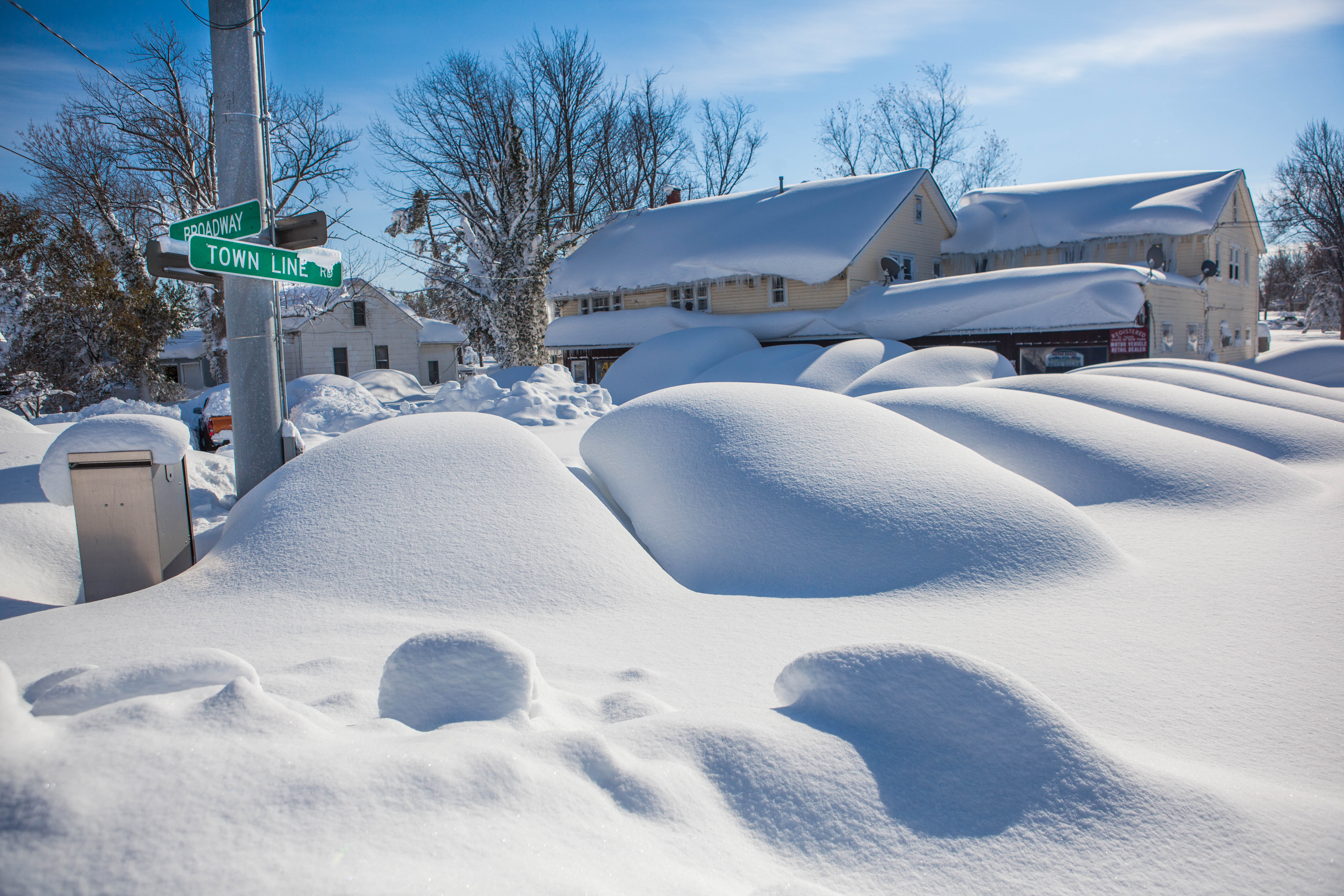
The snow in Town Line, New York, on November 17

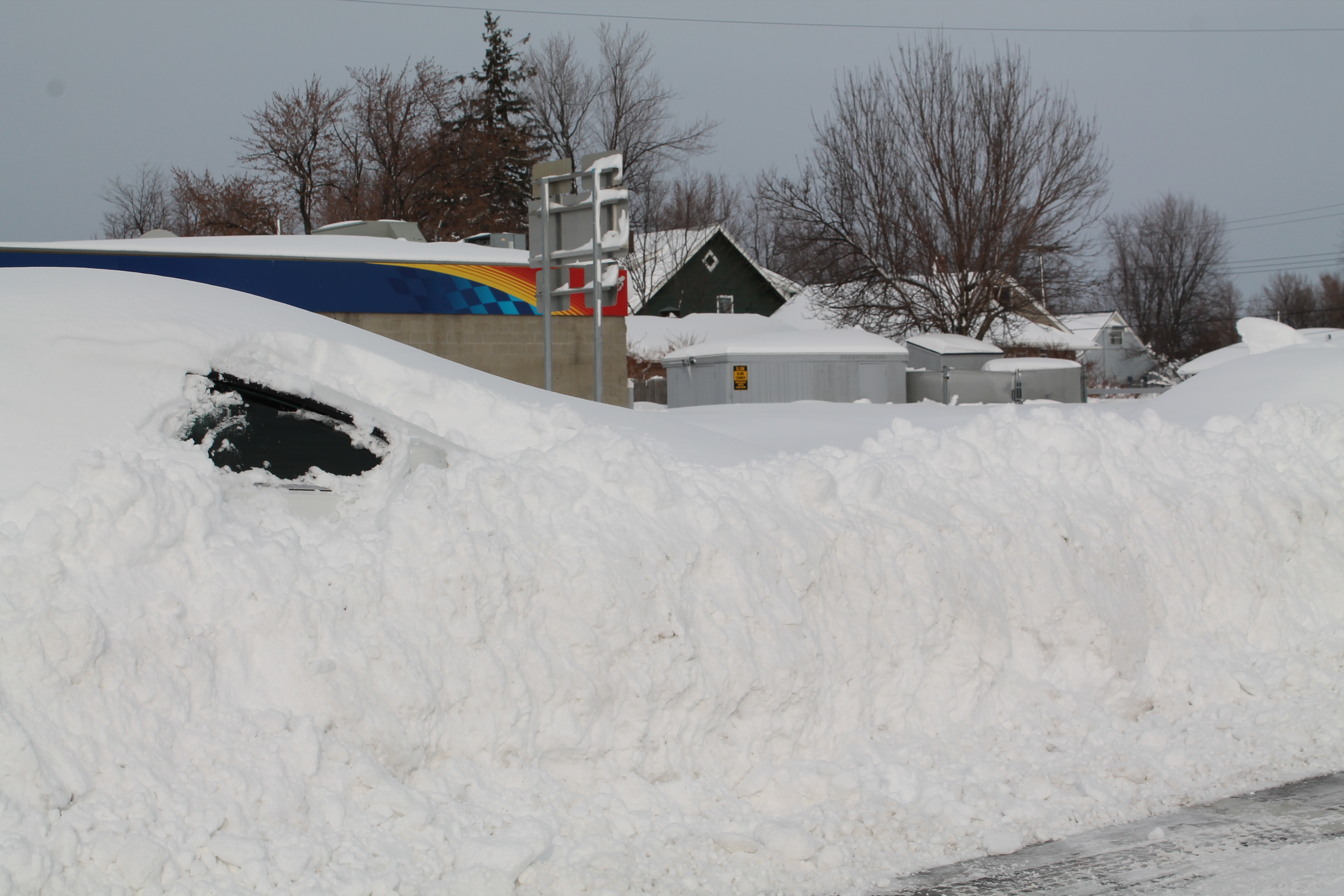
A car buried in the snow

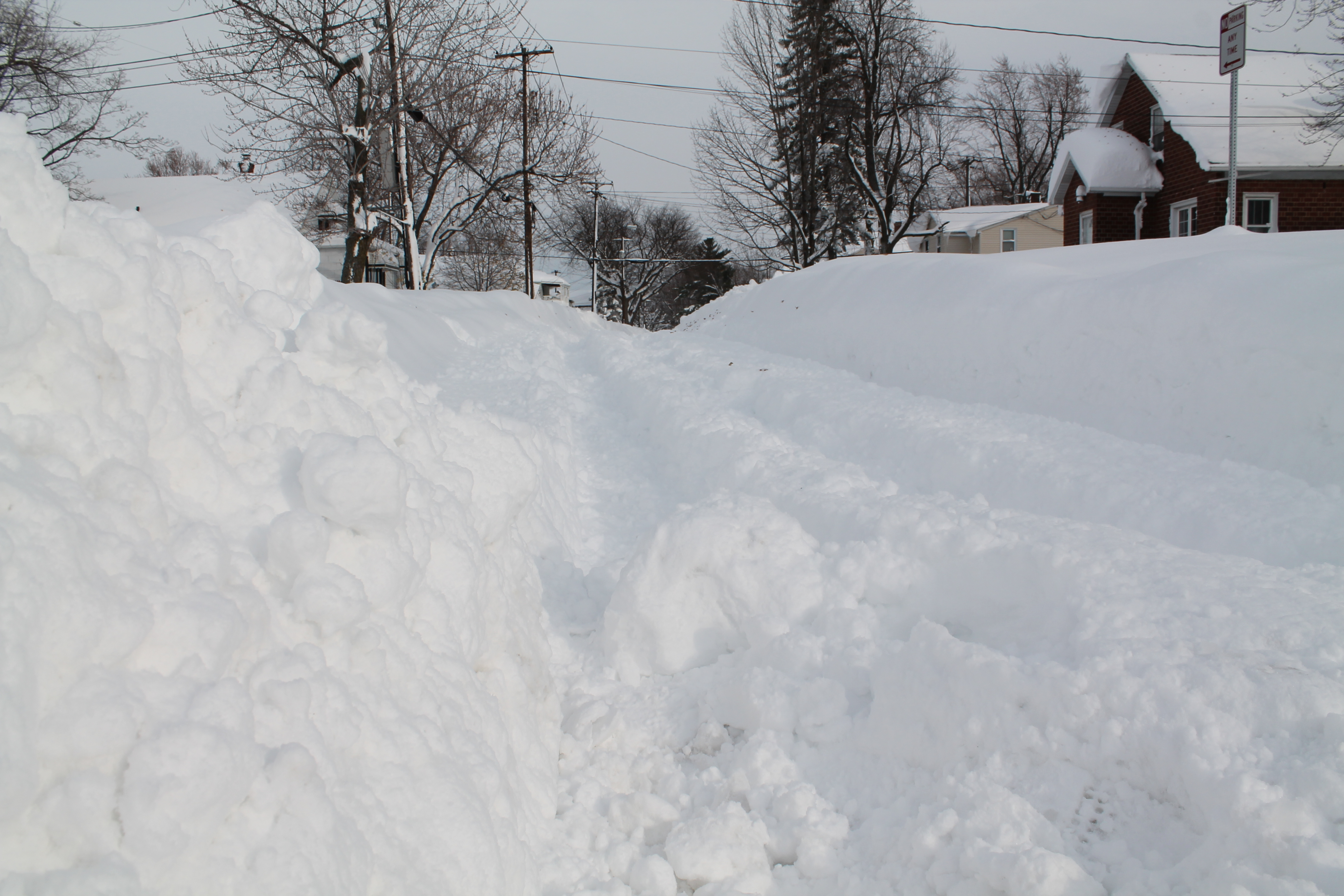
A partially cleared street

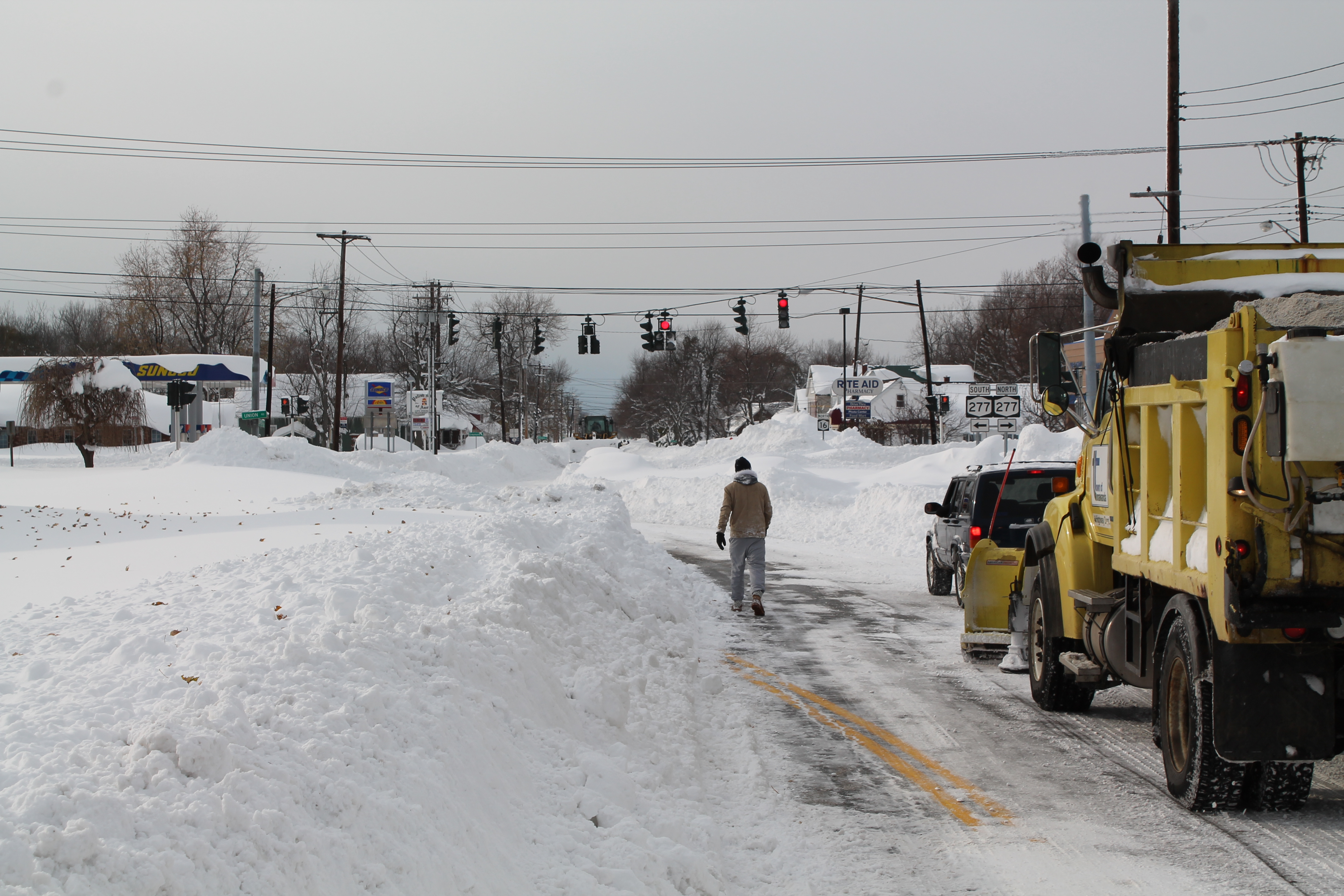
A major intersection in West Seneca, New York being cleared (Union Rd/NY 277 and Center Rd/NY 16) facing west toward Buffalo

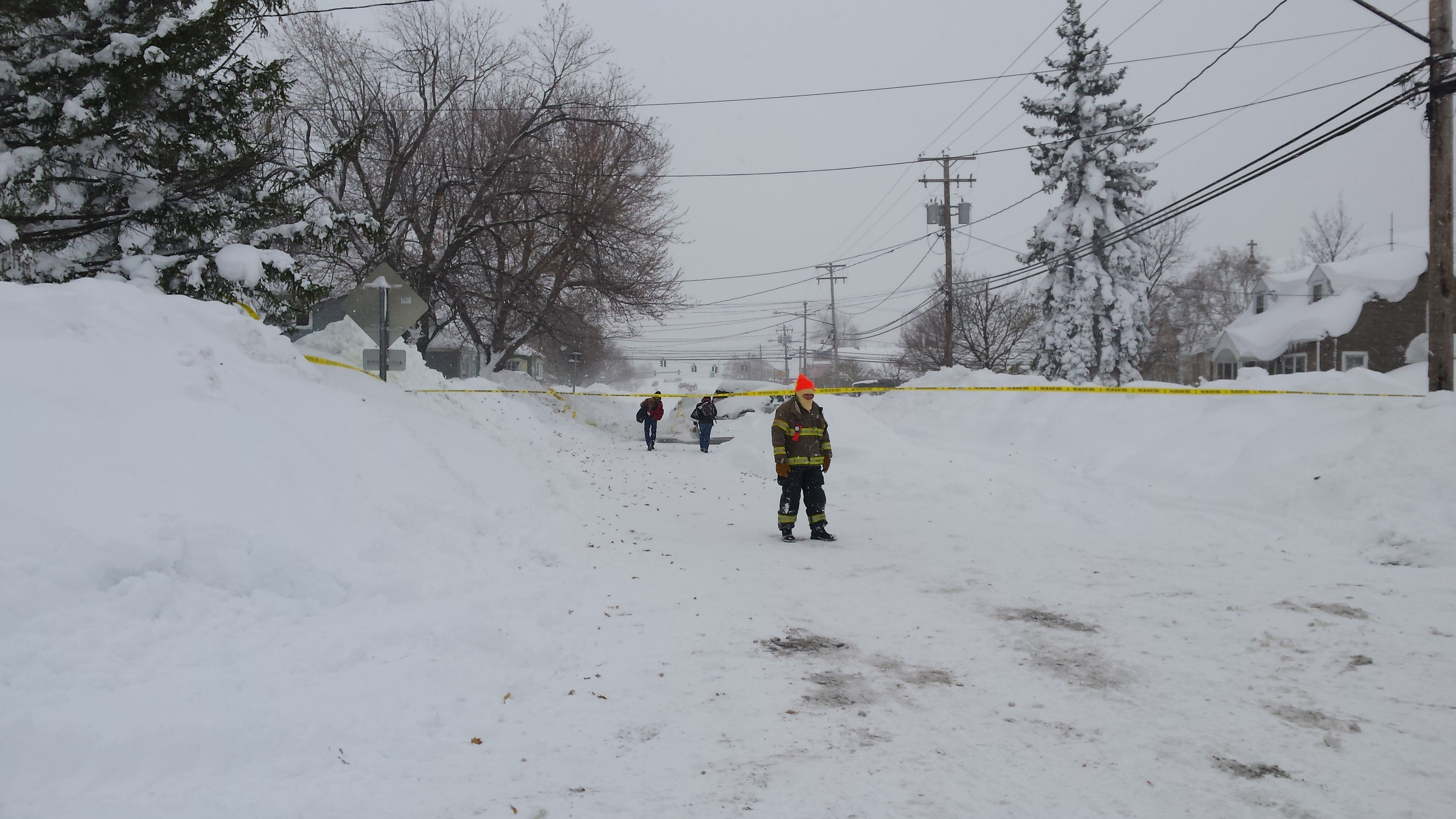
Harlem Rd in West Seneca, New York facing South, showing abandoned cars on November 19

== See also ==
- Weather of 2014
- Blizzard of 1977 – The deadliest Blizzard ever recorded in Buffalo
- Lake Storm "Aphid" – Commonly known as the "October Storm" of 2006
- February 11–17, 2014 North American winter storm
- December 2014 North American storm complex
- January 2016 United States blizzard
- November 2022 Great Lakes winter storm
