= Bellevue, Erie County, New York =

Hamlet in New York, United States

Coordinates: 42°53′36″N 78°44′02″W

Bellevue is a hamlet in the town of Cheektowaga in Erie County, New York, United States. It is east of Union Rd, south of Broadway.
