= Garrison Cemetery (Cheektowaga, New York) =

Historic cemetery in New York, United States

- U.S. National Register of Historic Places
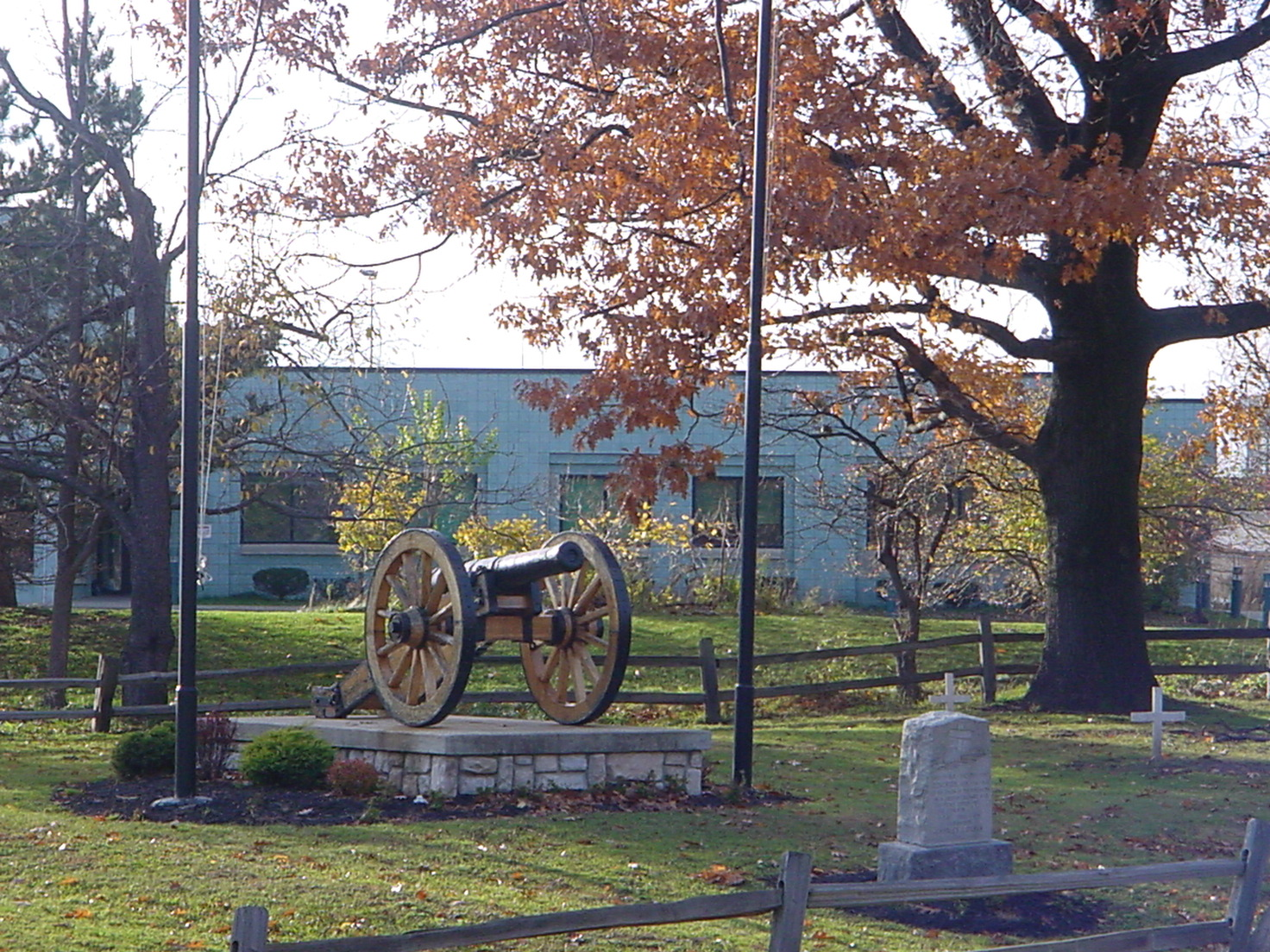

- Location within New York Location within the United States
- Location: Aero Dr., Cheektowaga, New York
- Coordinates: 42°56′49″N 78°43′50″W
- Built: 1814
- NRHP reference No.: 02001113
- Added to NRHP: October 10, 2002

Garrison Cemetery, also known as the War of 1812 Cemetery, is a historic cemetery located at Cheektowaga in Erie County, New York. It is the final resting place for American and British soldiers who fought in the Niagara Frontier Campaign of the War of 1812. The cemetery is located on the site of the General Military Hospital, established August 1, 1814, at Williams Mill.

It was listed on the National Register of Historic Places in 2002.

== Gallery ==
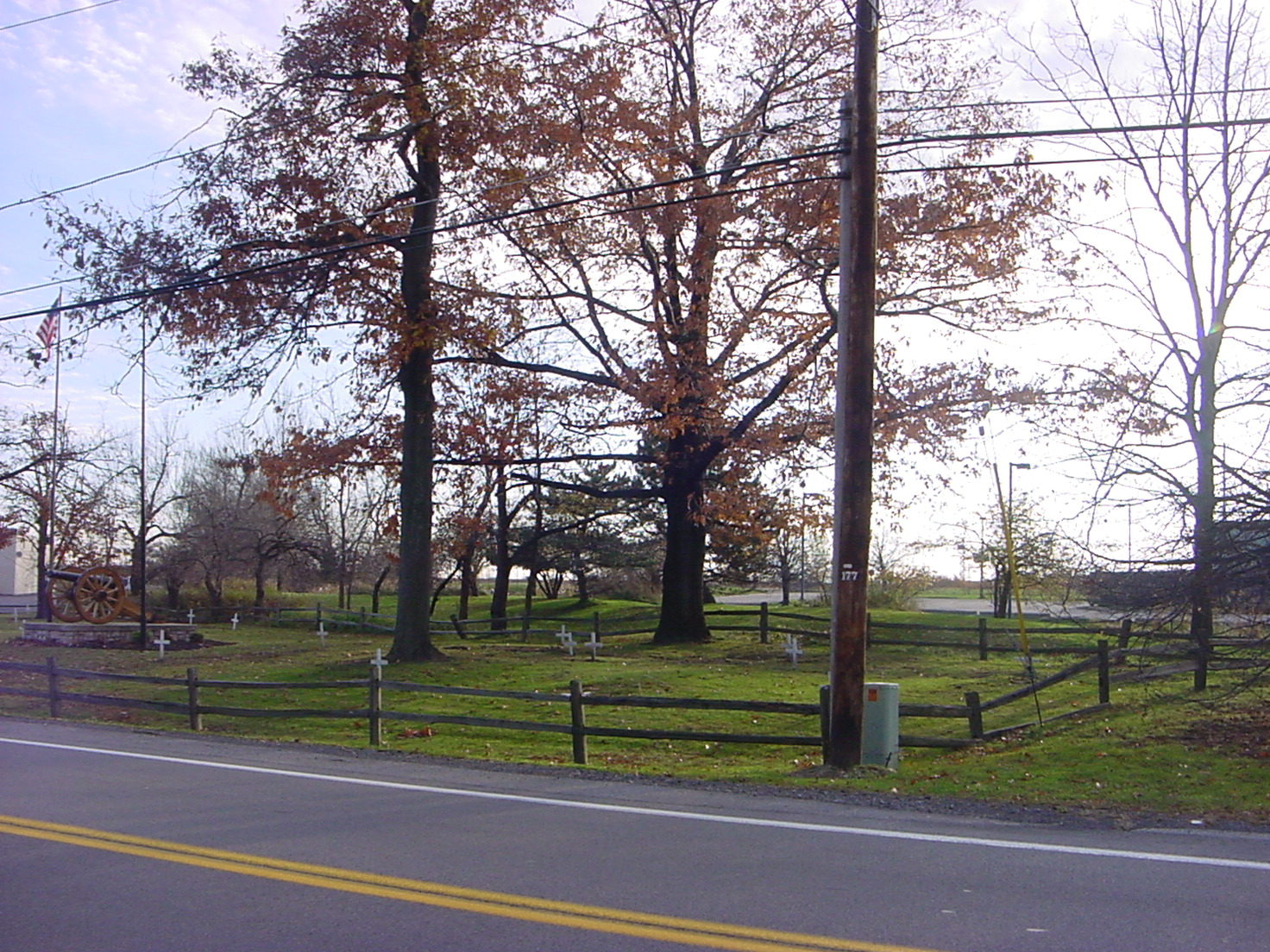
Garrison Cemetery, November 2009

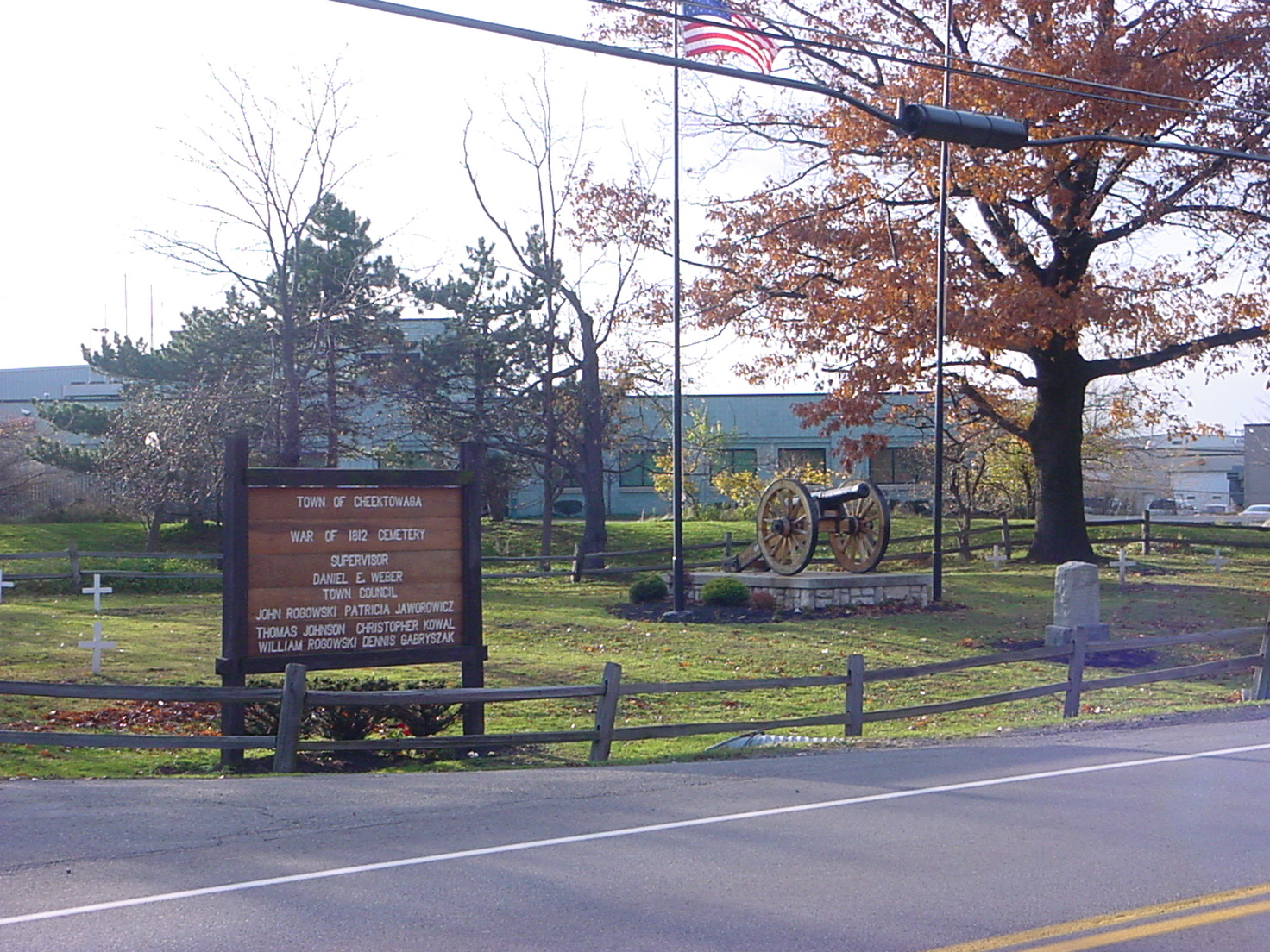
Garrison Cemetery, November 2009

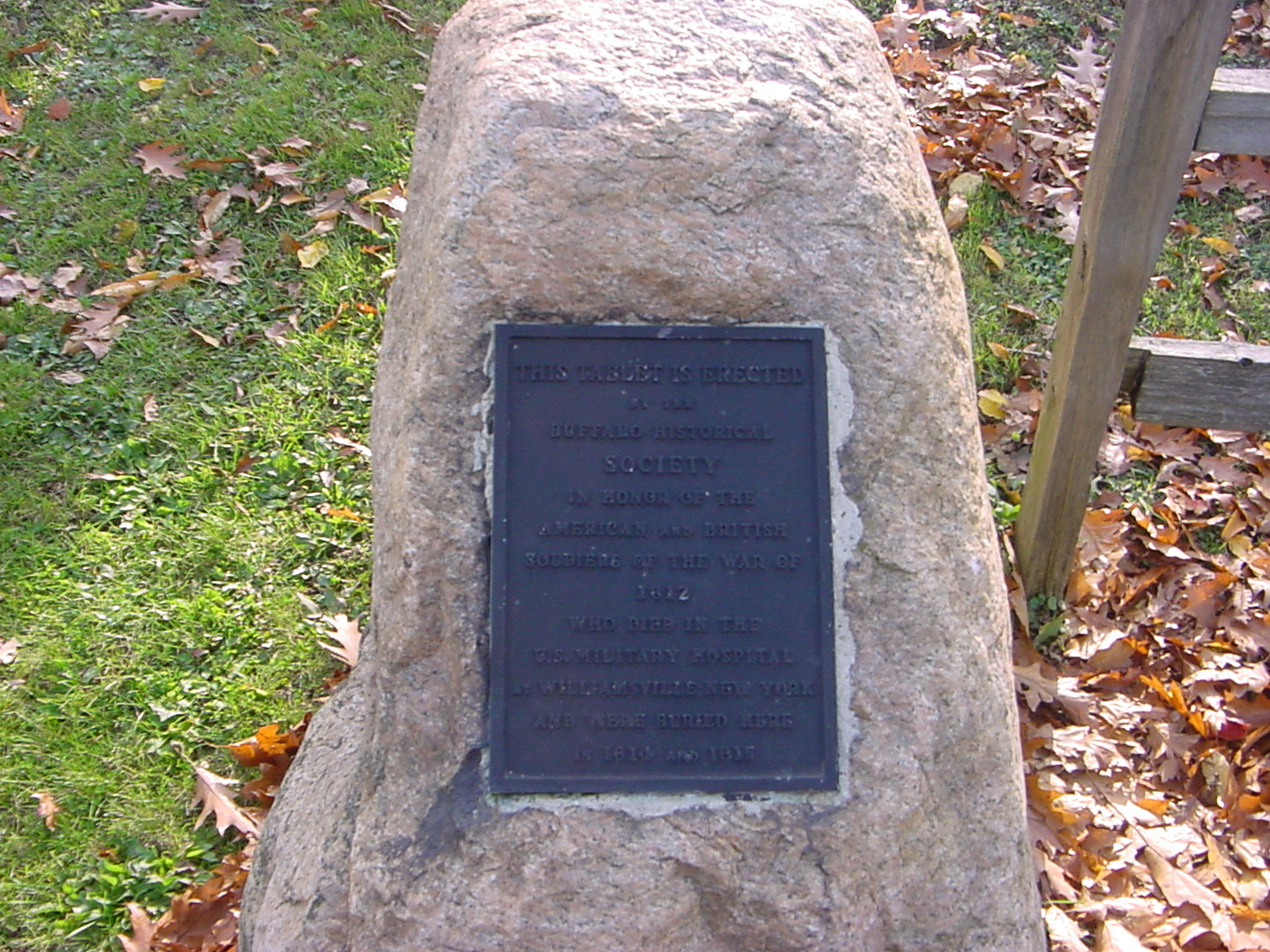
Garrison Cemetery, November 2009

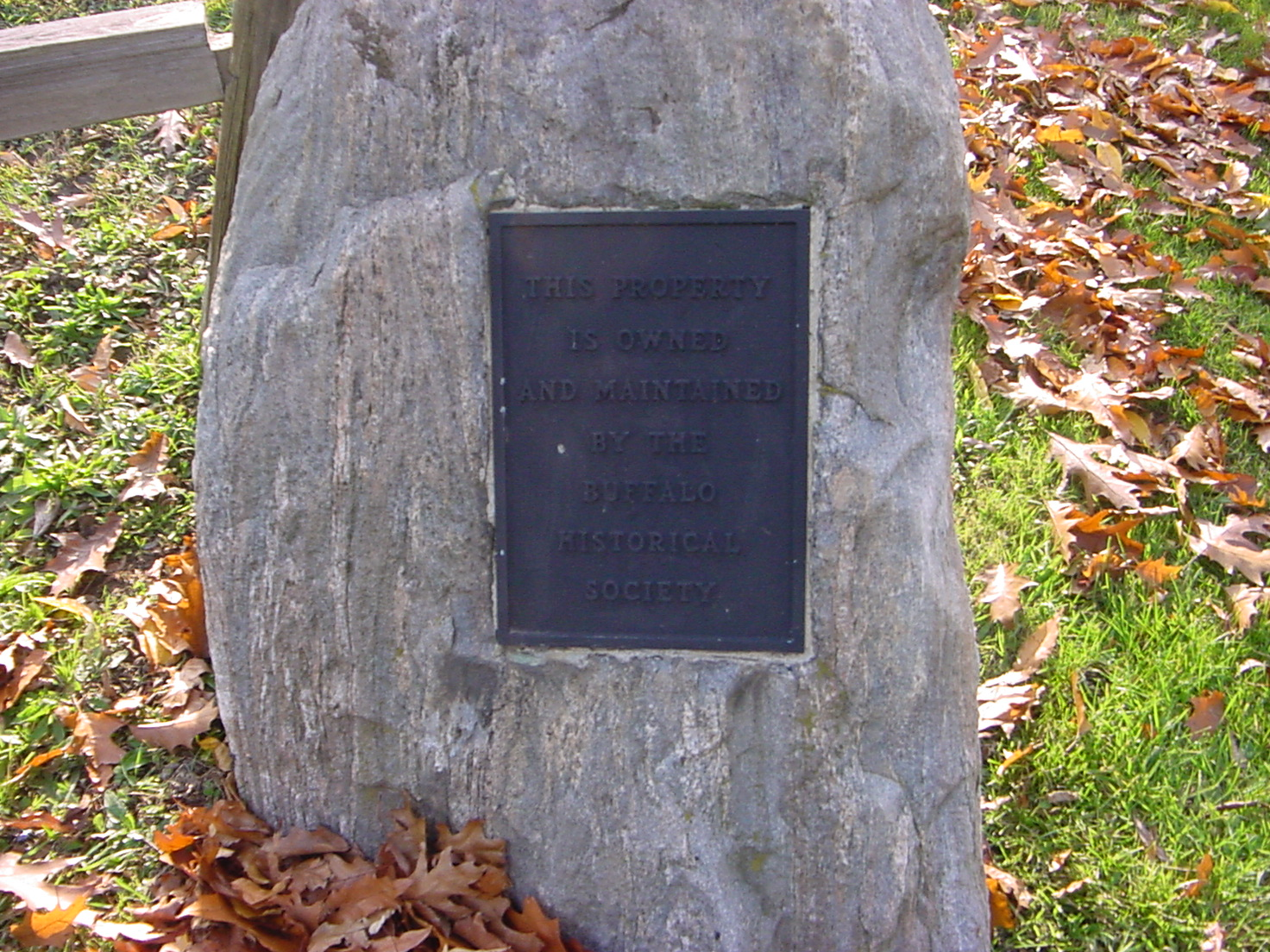
Garrison Cemetery, November 2009

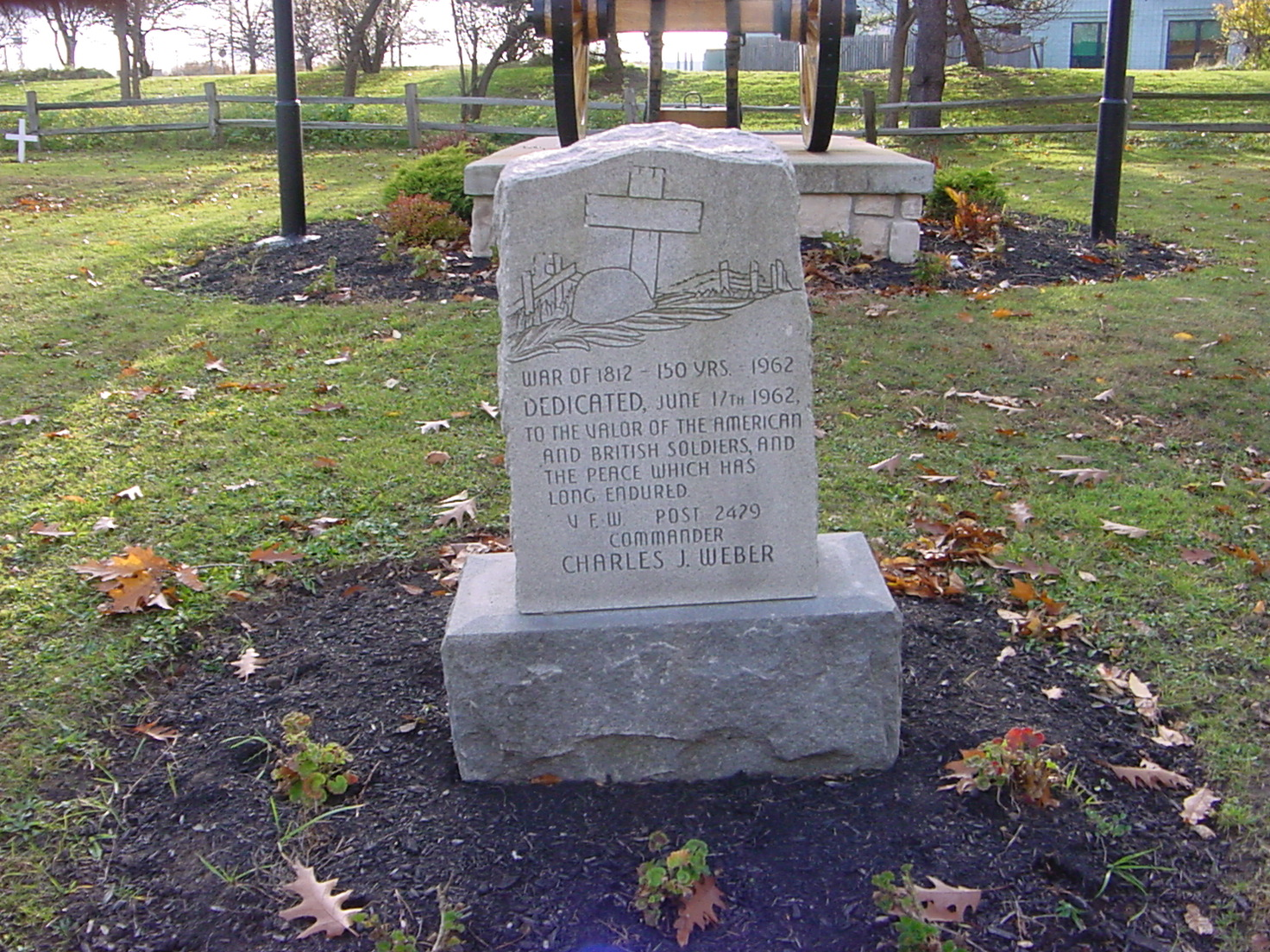
Garrison Cemetery, November 2009
