= Cheektowaga-Sloan Union Free School District =

School district in the U.S. state of New York

Location
- Sloan, New York Erie County United States

District information
- Motto: Excellence in Education
- Grades: K-12
- Superintendent: Andrea Galenski
- Schools: 4
- NCES District ID: 3621240

Students and staff
- Athletic conference: Section VI

Other information
- Website: Cheektowaga Sloan UFSD

Cheektowaga-Sloan Union Free School District is a school district in Sloan, New York, United States.

The district operates four schools: John F. Kennedy High School, John F. Kennedy Middle School, Woodrow Wilson Elementary School, and Theodore Roosevelt Elementary School.

== Administration ==
The District offices are located 166 Halstead Avenue in Sloan. The current Superintendent is Andrea Galenski.

== District history ==
=== Selected former superintendents ===
Previous assignment and reason for departure denoted in parentheses

- J. Ernest Wilson–1928-1953 (unknown, retired)
- Leon A. Kaminski–1953-1969 (Principal - Theodore Roosevelt Elementary School, retired)
- Joseph S. Gizinski–1969-1981 (unknown, retired)
- James P. Mazgajewski–1981-2012 (Admissions Recruiter - Canisius College, retired)

== John F. Kennedy High School ==
John F. Kennedy High School
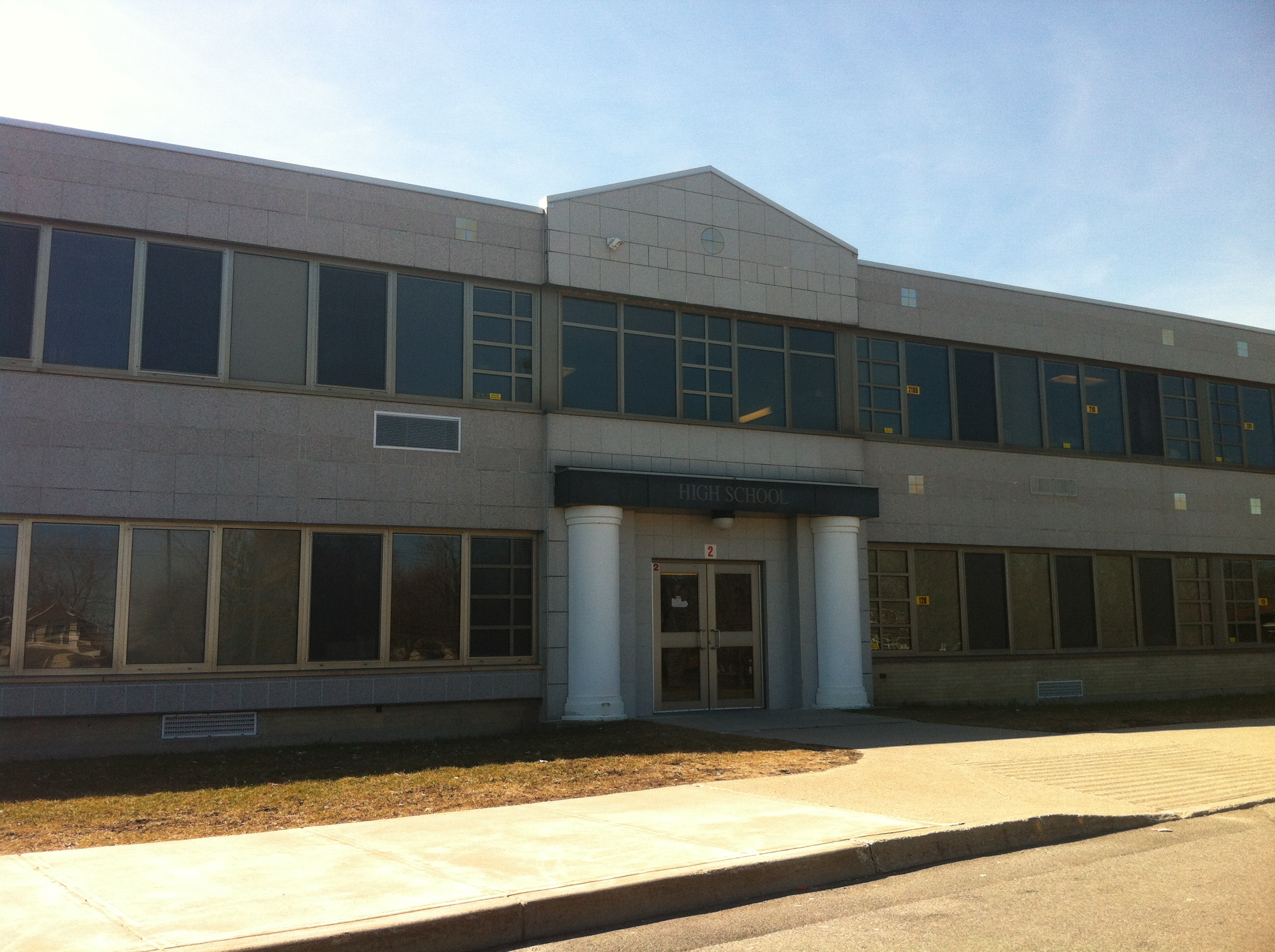

Location
- 305 Cayuga Creek Road; Cheektowaga, Erie, New York 14227

Information
- NCES School ID: 362700003672
- Principal: Robert N. Julian, Jr.
- Grades: 9-12
- Team name: Bears
- Website: John F. Kennedy High School

John F. Kennedy Senior High School (formerly Sloan High School) is located at 305 Cayuga Creek Road and serves grades 9 through 12. The current principal is Robert Julian.

=== History ===
John F. Kennedy High School was opened on September 5, 1962 and the cornerstone was laid on August 12, 1962. It would later be named after President John F. Kennedy, the first school to do so. Until 1997, the middle school grades were housed in the high school until the district formed the new middle school.

== John F. Kennedy Middle School ==
John F. Kennedy Middle School
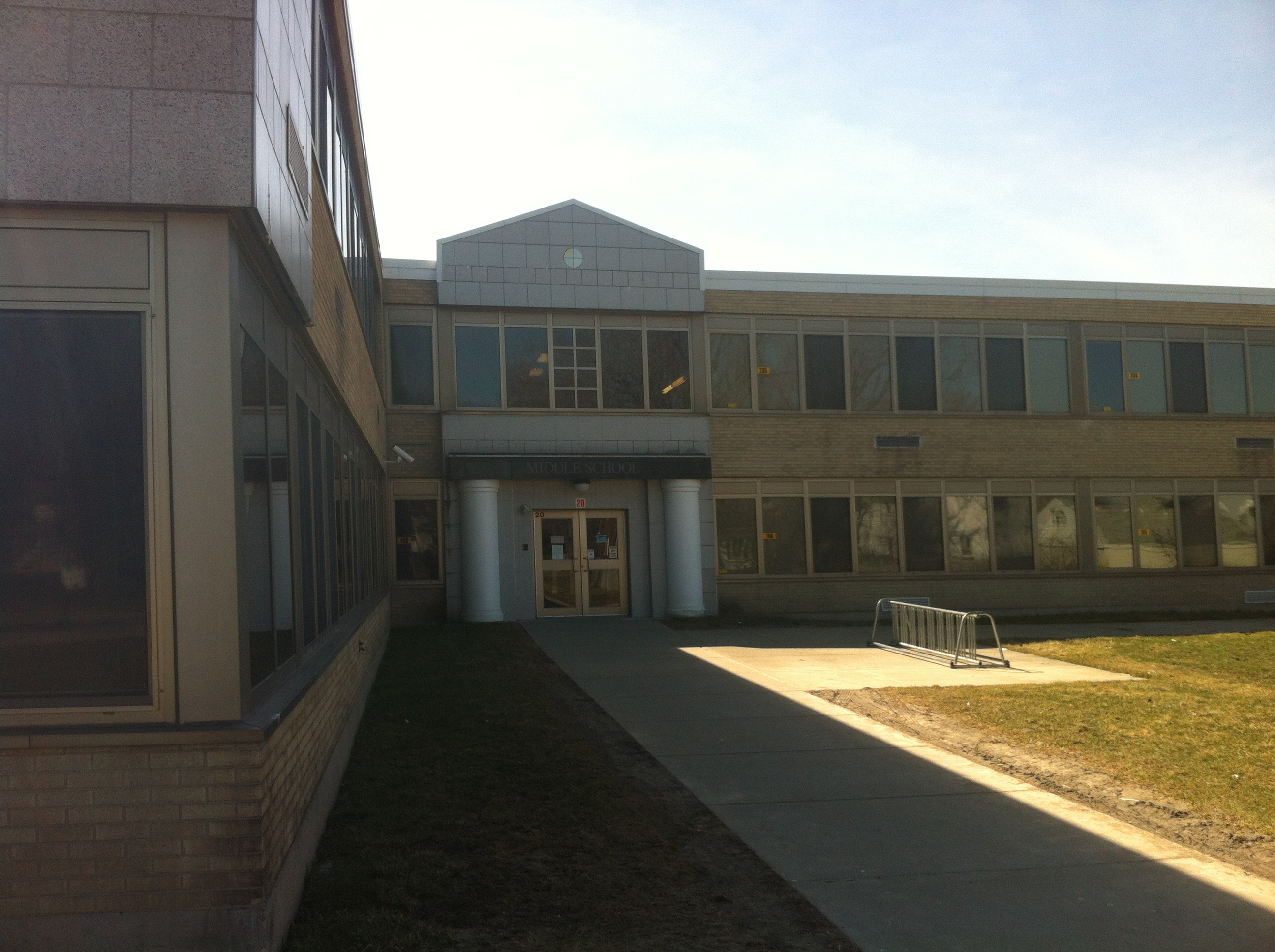

Location
- 305 Cayuga Creek Road; Cheektowaga, Erie, New York 14227

Information
- Principal: Christopher Farrell
- Grades: 6-8
- Team name: Bears
- Website: John F. Kennedy Middle School

John F. Kennedy Middle School is located at 305 Cayuga Creek Road and serves grades 6 through 8. The current principal is Christopher Farrell.

=== History ===
JFK Middle School was formed in 1997. Previously, the middle school grades were housed at John F. Kennedy High School. The school building was reconstructed to house the new middle school.

== Woodrow Wilson Elementary School ==
Woodrow Wilson Elementary
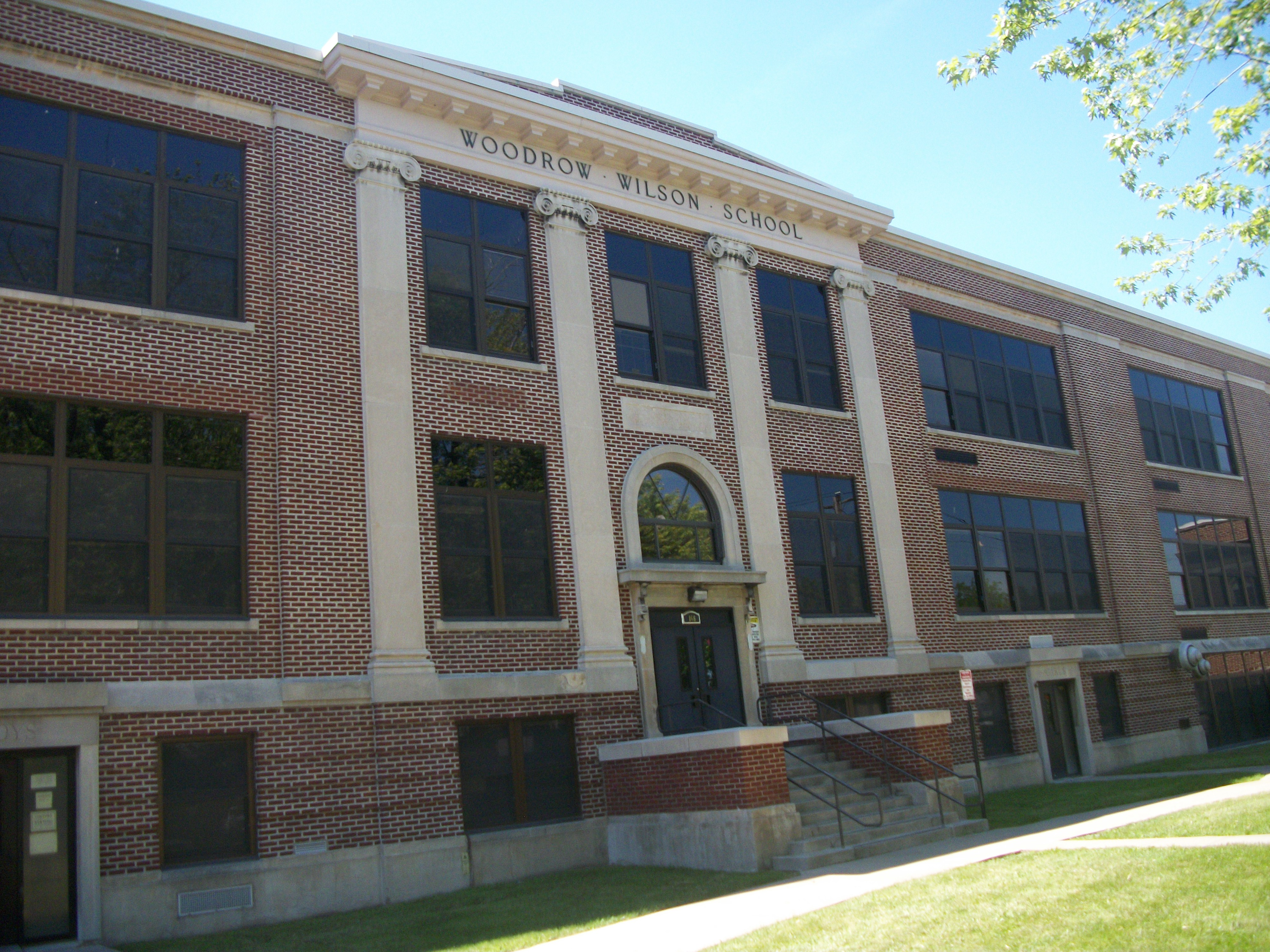

Location
- 166 Halstead Avenue; Sloan, Erie County, New York 14212

Information
- Principal: Elizabeth L. Zaccarine
- Grades: 3-5
- Website: Woodrow Wilson Elementary

Woodrow Wilson Elementary School is located at 166 Halstead Avenue and serves grades 3 through 5. The current principal is Elizabeth Zaccarine.

== Theodore Roosevelt Elementary ==
Theodore Roosevelt Elementary
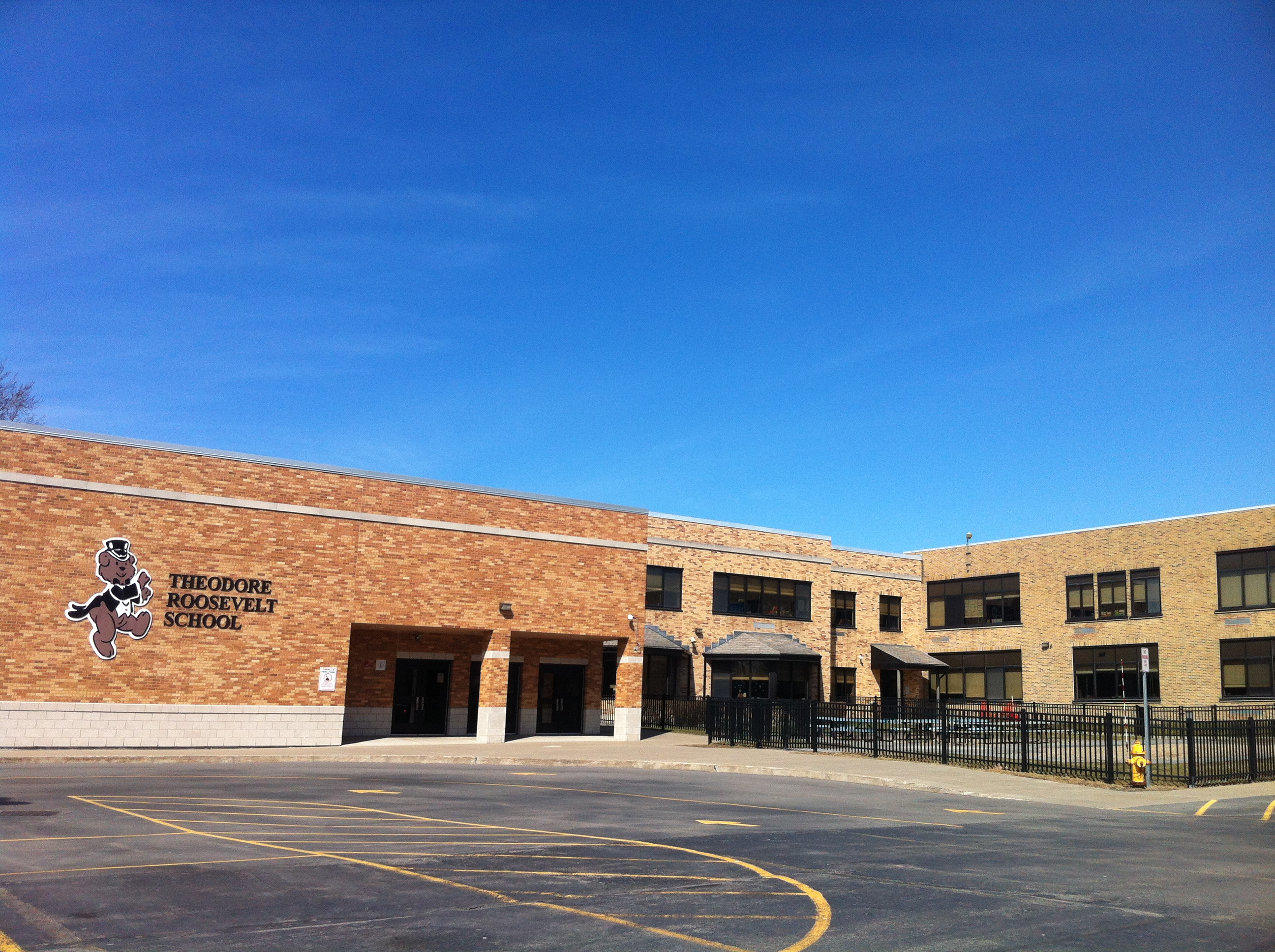

Location
- 2495 William Street; Cheektowaga, Erie, New York 14206

Information
- Principal: Jeffrey S. Mochrie
- Grades: K-2
- Mascot: Teddy Bears
- Website: Theodore Roosevelt Elementary

Theodore Roosevelt Elementary School is located at 2495 William Street and serves grades Pre K through 2. The current principal is Jeffrey Mochrie.
