= Angela Wozniak =

American politician (born 1987)

Angela M. Wozniak
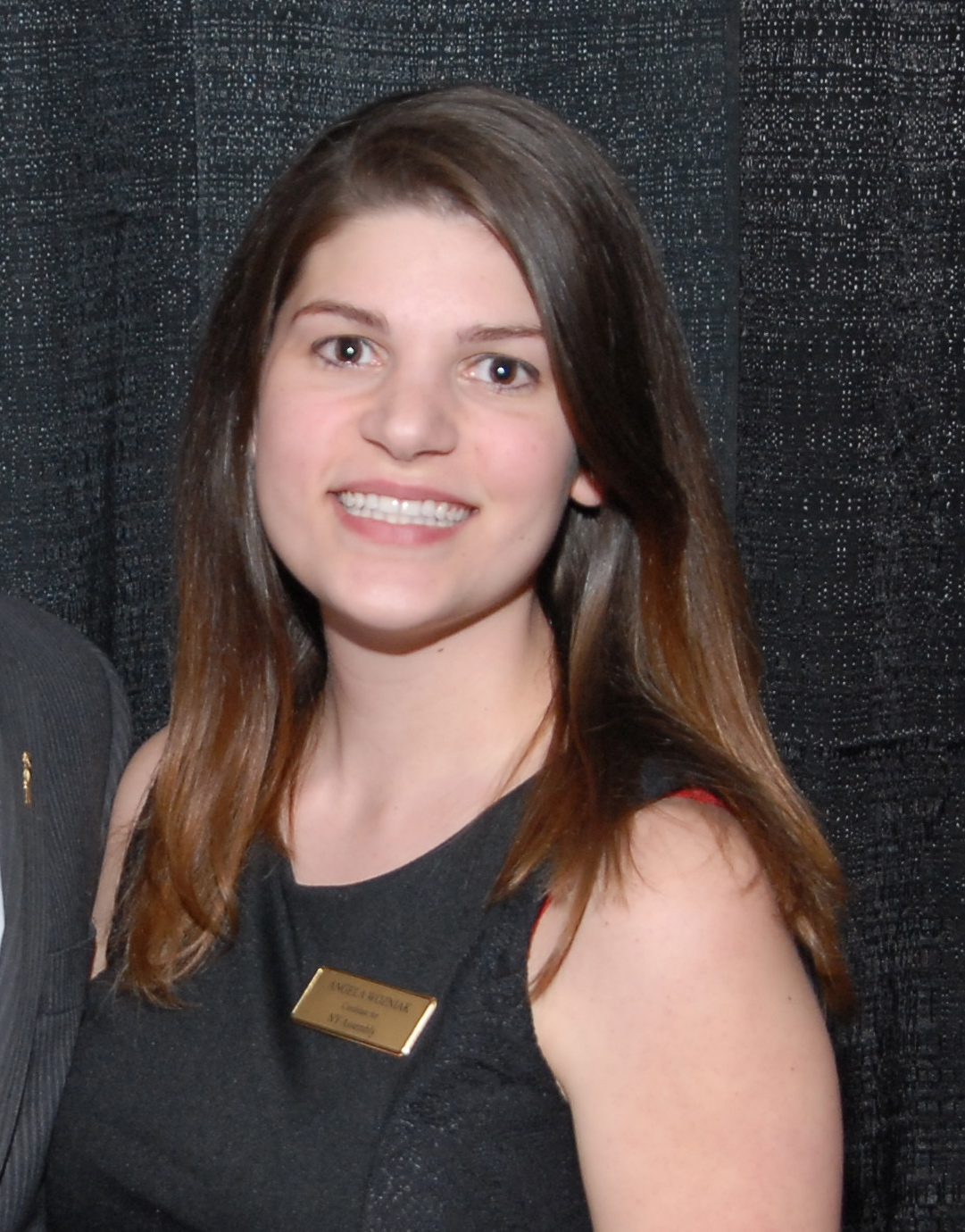

Member of the New York State Assembly from the 143rd district
- In office January 1, 2015 – December 31, 2016
- Preceded by: Dennis Gabryszak
- Succeeded by: Monica P. Wallace

Personal details
- Born: March 11, 1987 (age 39) Buffalo, New York
- Party: Conservative
- Spouse: Phil Drenning
- Children: 1
- Education: D'Youville College (B.B.M.)
- Profession: Insurance Broker
- Website: Assembly Website

Angela Wozniak (born March 11, 1987) is a former member of the New York State Assembly, serving from 2015 to 2016. She represented the 143rd district, which included Cheektowaga, Lancaster, and Depew, New York. A registered Conservative, Wozniak caucused with the Republican minority in the Assembly.

In March 2016, Wozniak was admonished by the Assembly Ethics Committee for having retaliated against a staffer with whom she had engaged in a sexual relationship, in violation of the Assembly's Policy Prohibiting Harassment, Discrimination and Retaliation. In May 2016, Wozniak announced that she would not seek reelection to the Assembly.

== Early life, family, and early career ==
Wozniak was born in Buffalo, New York to a Polish-American family and graduated from Lancaster High School. She graduated from D'Youville College with a degree in business management. She owns an insurance agency.

Wozniak is married to Phil Drenning. They have a son.

In 2011, Wozniak was elected to the Cheektowaga Town Board. During her time on the board, she fought against deliberate overpayment for sidewalk repairs.

== New York State Assembly ==
=== 2014 election ===
In the 2014 election, Wozniak ran for the 143rd State Assembly seat previously vacated by Dennis Gabryszak. She ran on both the Republican and Conservative ballot lines. The seat was considered to be a Democratic stronghold. In an upset, she defeated Democrat Mark M. Mazurek. Wozniak ran on an anti-corruption platform.

=== Tenure ===
One of Wozniak's first legislative actions was to introduce the Public Officers Accountability Act, which would have disqualified felons from receiving government contracts, lobbying or holding public office. She spoke out against unfunded mandates and proposed a moratorium on such mandates. Wozniak opposed letting transgender students use the school bathroom of their choice.

=== Scandal ===
On March 9, 2016, Wozniak was disciplined and banned from hiring interns following an investigation by the Assembly Ethics Committee. The investigation related to allegations made by a staffer with whom Wozniak had engaged in an extramarital affair. While the Committee "found insufficient evidence to conclude that the relationship at any point constituted 'quid pro quo sexual harassment'", it did find that Wozniak had retaliated against the staffer by tarnishing his reputation after their affair ended. Wozniak later apologized for exercising "very poor judgment [by] having [a] relationship with a staffer."

In May 2016, Wozniak announced that she would not seek reelection to her Assembly seat. She was succeeded by Democrat Monica P. Wallace.

As part of a 2019 settlement with New York's Joint Commission on Public Ethics, Wozniak admitted that she had broken state law when she made personnel decisions regarding the staffer with whom she had engaged in an affair.

Political offices
Preceded by Dennis Gabryszak	New York Assembly, 143rd District; 2015–2016	Succeeded by Monica P. Wallace
