= South Cheektowaga, New York =

Coordinates: 42°54′9″N 78°44′40″W

South Cheektowaga
- Neighborhood
- Interactive map of South Cheektowaga
- Country: United States
- State: New York
- County: Erie County
- Time zone: UTC-5 (EST)
  - Summer (DST): UTC-4 (EDT)
- ZIP code: 14225/14227
- Area code: 716

South Cheektowaga is a neighborhood on the West Seneca border near French Road, in the town of Cheektowaga, in Erie County, New York, United States.

It is home to the large South Line Fire Company, as well as Stigimeier Park (Losson Park), where nature trails and sports areas are located, the latter of which is used by area leagues, such as South Cheektowaga Baseball Association and the Cheektowaga Recreation Department. Adjacent to the park is located the Reinstein Woods Nature Preserve, a DEC protected area. The area is mainly residential, with a few larger stores along the main routes.

== Major highways in South Cheektowaga ==
- U.S. Route 20 (Transit Road), North-South roadway that runs concurrently with NY 78 along Cheektowaga's eastern border with Lancaster, south of Depew.
- New York State Route 78 (Transit Road), north-south roadway that provides the eastern border of Cheektowaga with Lancaster, north of Depew.
- New York State Route 277 (Union Rd.), north-south highway through the town from West Seneca north to Amherst.
- New York State Route 354 (Clinton St.), east-west roadway through the extreme southwestern corner of town, and provides the southern border with West Seneca.
