= Sloan, New York =

- Village
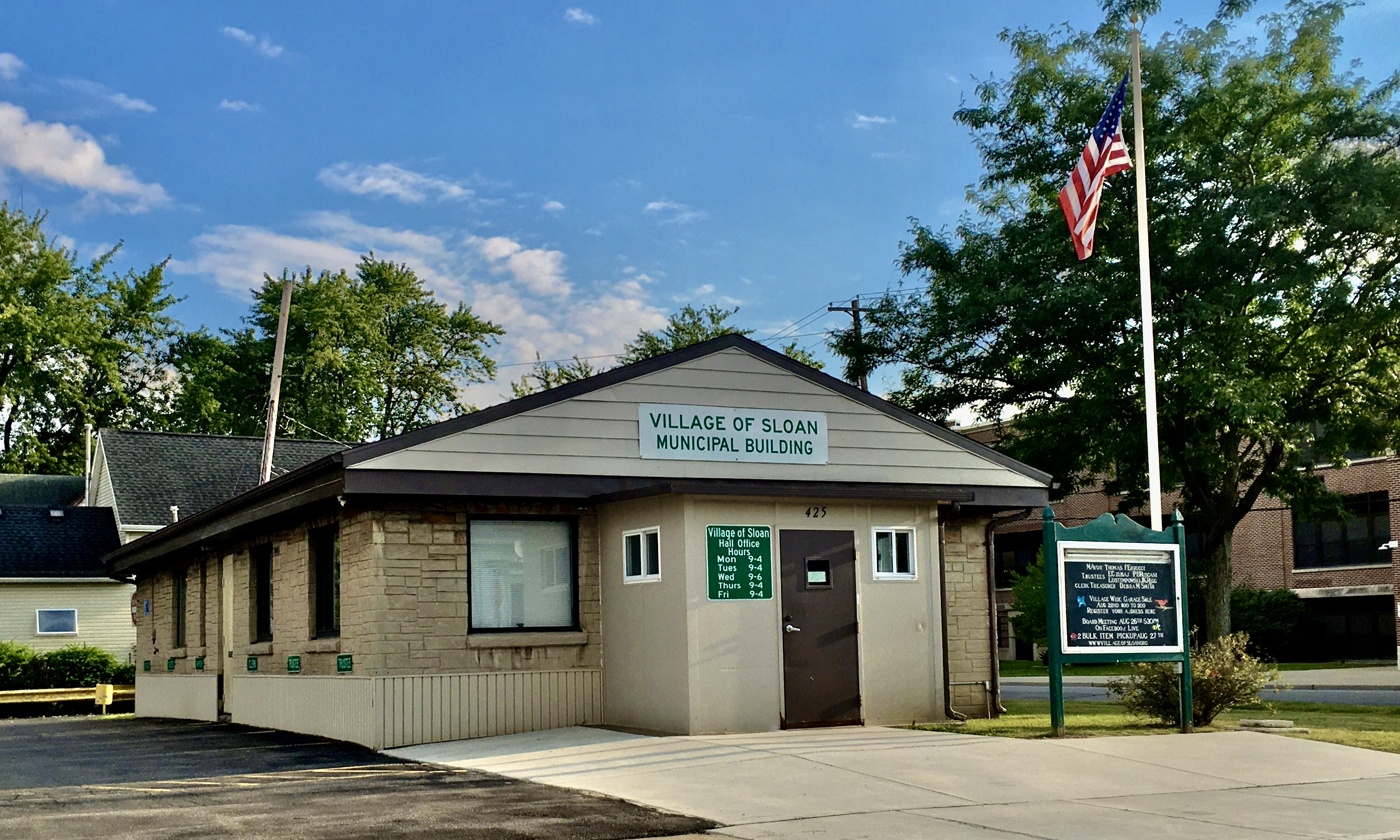
- Sloan Municipal Building

- Seal

- Location in Erie County and the state of New York
- Coordinates: 42°53′40″N 78°47′29″W
- Country: United States
- State: New York
- County: Erie
- Town: Cheektowaga
- Incorporated: 1896

Area
  - Total: 0.79 sq mi (2.04 km^{2})
  - Land: 0.78 sq mi (2.02 km^{2})
  - Water: 0.0077 sq mi (0.02 km^{2})
- Elevation: 614 ft (187 m)

Population (2020)
  - Total: 3,775
  - Density: 4,839.9/sq mi (1,868.69/km^{2})
- Time zone: UTC-5 (Eastern (EST))
  - Summer (DST): UTC-4 (EDT)
- ZIP Codes: 14212 (Sloan); 14206 (Cheektowaga)
- Area code: 716
- FIPS code: 36-67686
- GNIS feature ID: 0965429
- Website: ns.villageofsloan.org

Sloan is a village in Erie County, New York, United States. As of the 2020 census, Sloan had a population of 3,775. It is part of the Buffalo-Niagara Falls metropolitan area and is in the town of Cheektowaga.

== History ==
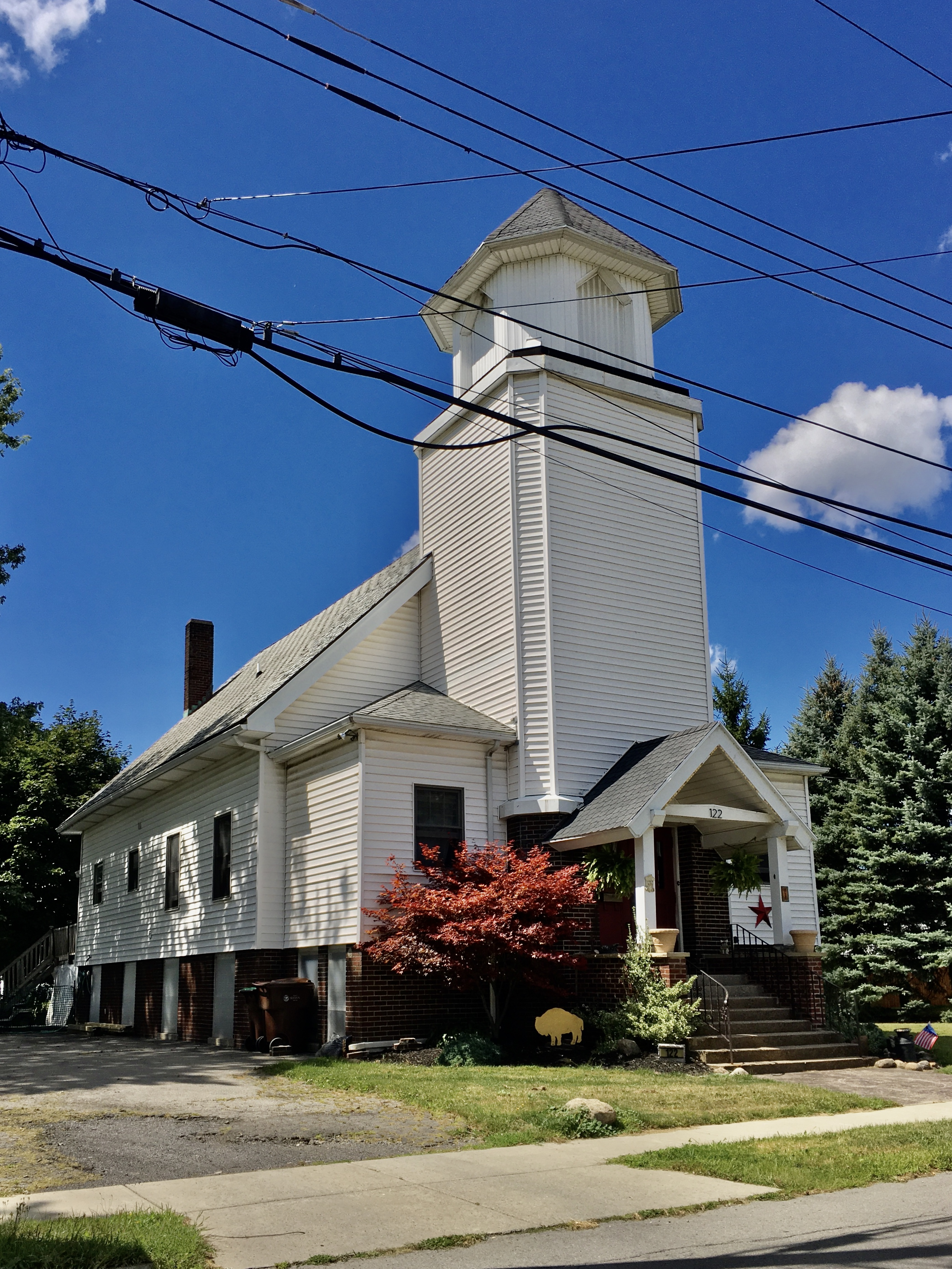
Former Sloan Presbyterian Church

The village was incorporated in 1896 from part of Cheektowaga. With the CSX Frontier yard to the village's north and the Norfolk Southern Bison yard to the village's south, it was a historically important railroad town like nearby Depew. These yards were originally the New York Central and Erie-Lackawanna, respectively.

For much of its history the village had a police force ranging from three to six officers. The force was abolished circa 1978, and the four patrolmen and one captain were absorbed by the Cheektowaga Police Department, which to this day provides police services to the village.

Visniak brand soft drinks were made in Sloan.

== Notable people ==
- Jerry Augustyniak, drummer for 10,000 Maniacs
- Edmund P. Radwan, former US congressman

== Geography ==
Sam Sloan owned the land which extended to the New York State Thruway when it was founded, but it is only 1-square-mile (2.6 km^{2}) today. Sloan is located at 42°53′40″N 78°47′29″W (42.894458, -78.791353).

According to the United States Census Bureau, the village has a total area of 0.8 square miles (2.1 km^{2}), all land.

The village is bounded on the north by New York State Route 130 (Broadway) and on the east by New York State Route 240 (Harlem Road).

== Demographics ==
Historical population
Census	Pop.	Note	%±
1900	873		—
1910	1,259		44.2%
1920	1,791		42.3%
1930	3,482		94.4%
1940	3,836		10.2%
1950	4,698		22.5%
1960	5,803		23.5%
1970	5,216		−10.1%
1980	5,529		6.0%
1990	5,830		5.4%
2000	6,775		16.2%
2010	7,532		11.2%
2020	3,775		−49.9%
U.S. Decennial Census

=== 2020 census ===
As of the 2020 census, Sloan had a population of 3,775. The median age was 39.3 years. 19.9% of residents were under the age of 18 and 15.9% of residents were 65 years of age or older. For every 100 females there were 93.6 males, and for every 100 females age 18 and over there were 91.5 males age 18 and over.

100.0% of residents lived in urban areas, while 0.0% lived in rural areas.

There were 1,684 households in Sloan, of which 26.4% had children under the age of 18 living in them. Of all households, 31.5% were married-couple households, 23.8% were households with a male householder and no spouse or partner present, and 34.4% were households with a female householder and no spouse or partner present. About 35.2% of all households were made up of individuals and 13.8% had someone living alone who was 65 years of age or older.

There were 1,827 housing units, of which 7.8% were vacant. The homeowner vacancy rate was 1.4% and the rental vacancy rate was 8.6%.

Racial composition as of the 2020 census
Race	Number	Percent
White	3,115	82.5%
Black or African American	316	8.4%
American Indian and Alaska Native	17	0.5%
Asian	54	1.4%
Native Hawaiian and Other Pacific Islander	0	0.0%
Some other race	65	1.7%
Two or more races	208	5.5%
Hispanic or Latino (of any race)	189	5.0%

=== 2000 census ===
At the 2000 census there were 3,775 people, 1,680 households, and 1,033 families living in the village. The population density was 4,755.6 inhabitants per square mile (1,836.1/km^{2}). There were 1,789 housing units at an average density of 2,253.7 per square mile (870.2/km^{2}). The racial makeup of the village was 99.05% White, 0.21% African American, 0.13% Native American, 0.13% Asian, 0.16% from other races, and 0.32% from two or more races. Hispanic or Latino of any race were 0.72%.

Of the 1,680 households 24.0% had children under the age of 18 living with them, 44.5% were married couples living together, 12.5% had a female householder with no husband present, and 38.5% were non-families. 33.3% of households were one person and 18.9% were one person aged 65 or older. The average household size was 2.25 and the average family size was 2.89.

The age distribution was 20.1% under the age of 18, 6.5% from 18 to 24, 28.8% from 25 to 44, 20.4% from 45 to 64, and 24.2% 65 or older. The median age was 42 years. For every 100 females, there were 89.3 males. For every 100 females age 18 and over, there were 86.2 males.

The median household income was $29,420 and the median family income was $39,863. Males had a median income of $31,679 versus $23,438 for females. The per capita income for the village was $15,964. About 10.1% of families and 11.5% of the population were below the poverty line, including 19.1% of those under age 18 and 3.9% of those age 65 or over.
