= Maryvale High School (Cheektowaga, New York) =

Coordinates: 42°56′13.94″N 78°45′0.58″W

- 1050 Maryvale Drive, Cheektowaga, New York 14225; Cheektowaga, New York; United States

Information
- Type: Public
- Motto: S.O.A.R.: Safety, Ownership, Appropriate Actions, Respect.
- Established: 1955
- School district: Maryvale Union Free School District
- NCES School ID: 361860001678
- Principal: Jonathan Lattanzio
- Teaching staff: 55.32 (FTE)
- Grades: 9-12
- Enrollment: 647 (2023–2024)
- Student to teacher ratio: 11.70
- Colors: Maroon and white
- Mascot: Pegasus

Maryvale High School is a high school in Cheektowaga, New York, United States. It is a member of the Maryvale Union Free School District. As of the 2017-18 school year, the school has approximately 665 students.

== Athletics ==
Maryvale's sports teams are known as the Flyers.

Their main rivals are Cheektowaga Central (Central) and Depew High Schools. Their longest standing rival has been cross town Cleveland Hill High School which is the closest geographically to Maryvale's main campus. Maryvale's first widely known mascot was the Peanuts character Snoopy, depicted in his World War I goggles and pilot's hat flying after the Red Baron. Maryvale was established in the late 1940s after World War II. Due to its proximity to Buffalo Niagara International Airport (BUF/KBUF) and industries such as Bell Aerospace, Curtis Wright (P-40) and Calspan, Maryvale adopted its title as the Flyers. With the creation of Snoopy in 1950, Maryvale eventually adopted the most worldwide recognized pilot of the time as its mascot. Due to trademark usage/infringement issues (Peanuts Worldwide LLC), Maryvale's mascot has been changed to Pegasus. However Loyola College Prep in Shreveport, La is now the only school in the nation to legally have Snoopy as a World War I pilot as a mascot.

Maryvale has had many championship seasons throughout its history. From the beginning through the 1970s, Maryvale was a powerhouse of champions in all sports. Maryvale consistently sent athletes on to college and universities with partial and sometimes full scholarships. Maryvale graduates have successful careers in business, government, the military, and private sectors. The Maryvale boys’ basketball team won a section championship during the 2005-06 season and again during the 2006-07 season against Depew. Their boys’ soccer team also won a section title in 2010, defeating large school Sweet Home in a shootout. In March 2020, the Maryvale Varsity cheerleading team won the Division 2 small schools championship in the NYSPHSAA cheerleading competition at Rochester Institute of Technology.

== Administration ==
- Jonathan Lattanzio, Principal
- Stephanie Novo, Assistant Principal

== Notable alumni ==
- Andrew Anderson - NBA player
- Bob Charles Beers - Former NHL defenseman, current radio analyst for the Boston Bruins
- Andy DeLuca - 2006 graduate is an artist, nominated for 2 iHeart Radio Awards and an MTV VMA. Spent 2018-2020 traveling with Australian pop band 5 Seconds of Summer
- William Fichtner, Class of 1974 - Actor, as seen in The Dark Knight,"Mom", Prison Break, he also had a main cast role in Armageddon and appeared in The Longest Yard.
- Kevin Jobity Jr. – 2022 graduate is an NFL defensive tackle for the Pittsburgh Steelers
- Chelsea Noble: Actress, wife of Kirk Cameron.
- Pat Occhiuto - 1975 graduate of Maryvale is a retired Italian-American soccer forward who played professionally in the American Soccer League, United Soccer League, Major Indoor Soccer League and National Professional Soccer League.
- Sleepaway - Indie rock band.
