= Cheektowaga, New York =

Cheektowaga, New York Chictawauga (Seneca)
- Town
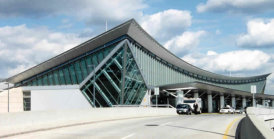
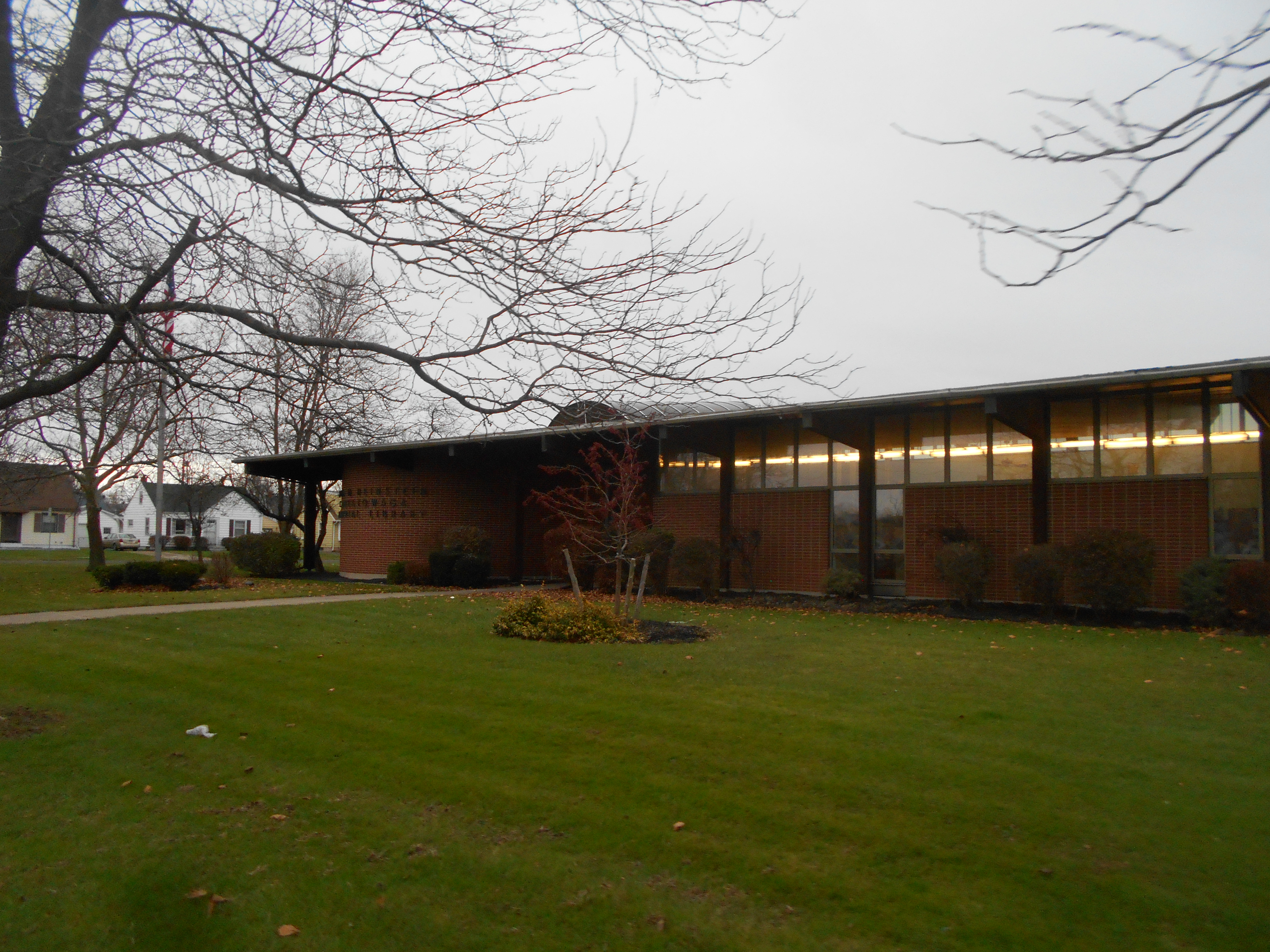
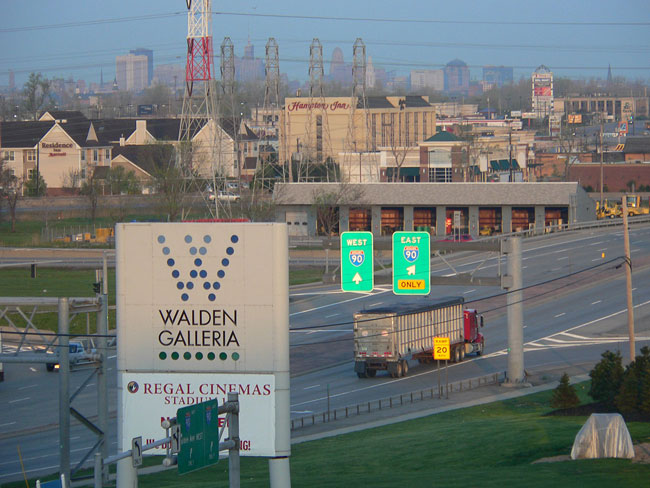
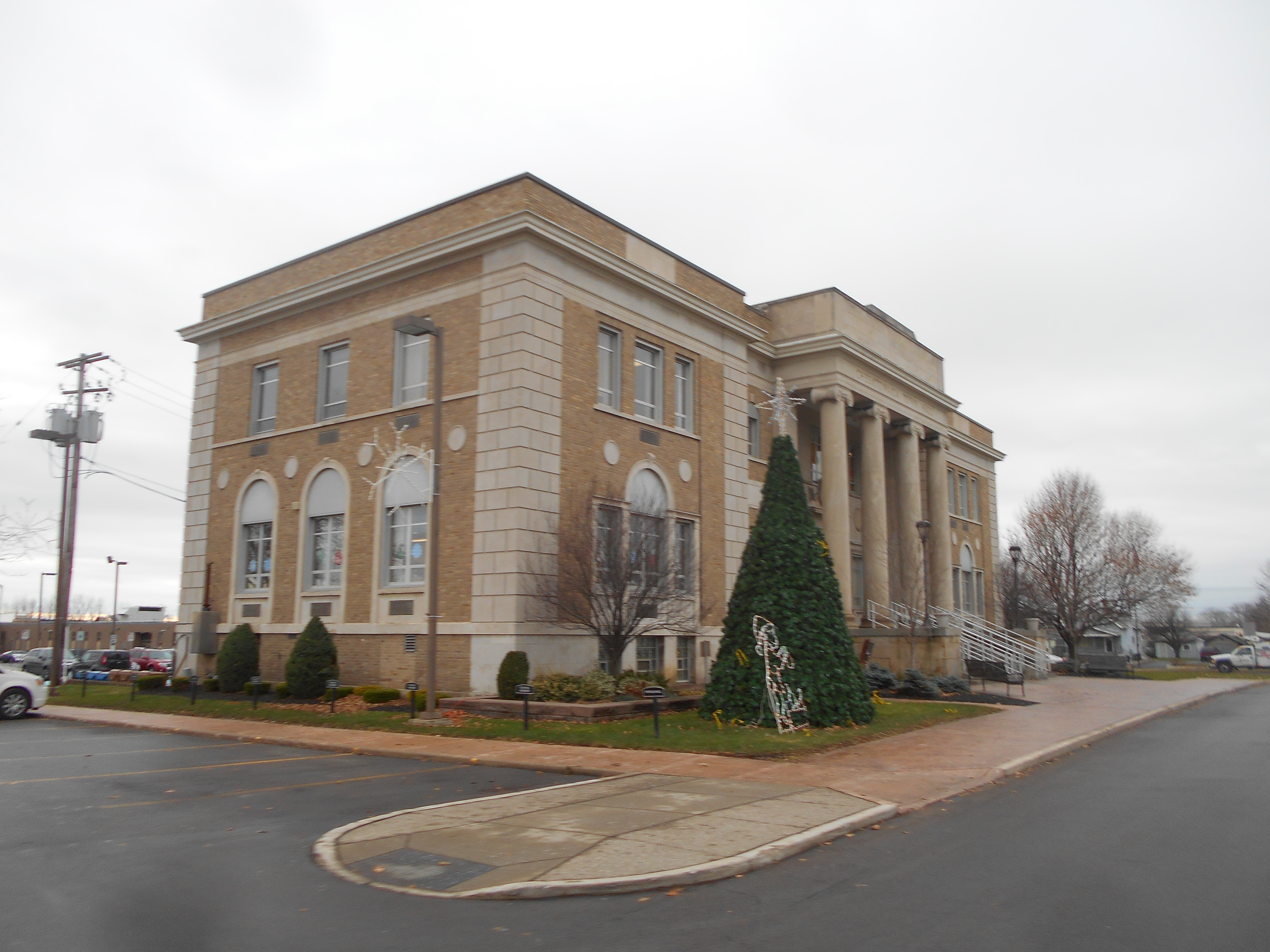
- Left to right from top: Buffalo Niagara International Airport, Anna M. Reinstein Public Library, Walden Galleria, Cheektowaga Town Hall

- Seal

- Location in Erie County and the state of New York.

- Location of New York in the United States
- Coordinates: 42°54′14″N 78°44′38″W
- Country: United States
- State: New York
- County: Erie County
- Incorporated: 1839
- Named for: Crabapples

Government
  - Town Supervisor: Brian Nowak (D)
  - Town Council: Members: Barbara Bakowski (R); Monica Elderkin (D); Tiffany Lewis (D); Stephen Nowicki (D); Brian Pilarski (D); Vernon Thompson (R)

Area
  - Total: 29.49 sq mi (76.39 km^{2})
  - Land: 29.43 sq mi (76.23 km^{2})
  - Water: 0.062 sq mi (0.16 km^{2})
- Elevation: 662 ft (202 m)

Population (2020)
  - Total: 89,877 ▲
  - Density: 2,955.4/sq mi (1,141.08/km^{2})
- Time zone: UTC-5 (EST)
  - Summer (DST): UTC-4 (EDT)
- ZIP Codes: 14225, 14227, 14206, 14215 (Cheektowaga); 14212 (Sloan); 14211 (Buffalo); 14043 (Depew); 14224 (West Seneca)
- Area code: 716
- FIPS code: 36-029-15011
- GNIS feature ID: 0971948
- Website: www.tocny.org

Cheektowaga (/ˌtʃiːktəˈwɑːɡə/ CHEEK-tə-WAH-gə; Seneca: Chictawauga) is a town in Erie County, New York, United States. As of the 2020 census, the town has grown to a population of 89,877. The town is in the north-central part of the county, and is an inner ring suburb of Buffalo. The town is the second-largest suburb of Buffalo, after the Town of Amherst.

The town of Cheektowaga contains the village of Sloan and half of the village of Depew. The remainder, outside the villages, is a census-designated place also named Cheektowaga. The town is home to Buffalo Niagara International Airport, Erie County's principal airport.

Villa Maria College, Empire State University, and the Walden Galleria are in Cheektowaga.

== History ==
Cheektowaga's earliest known historic occupants were the Iroquoian-speaking Neutral people. They were pushed out by the more powerful Seneca people, the most western of the Five Nations of the Haudenosaunee Confederacy, who were seeking to control the fur trade. They named this site as Chictawauga, meaning "land of the crabapples" in the Seneca language.

It was not until well after the American Revolutionary War that European-American settlers began to live here permanently. The Seneca had been forced to cede most of their land to the United States after the war, as they had been British allies. Cheektowaga was formed from the Town of Amherst on March 22, 1839. Upon the formation of West Seneca on October 16, 1851, it was reduced to its present limits—about 30 square miles (78 km^{2}). Throughout the 19th century, it was referred to by its original name, Chictawauga.

Originally a rural farming area, the town was extensively developed for suburban housing during the post-World War II subdivision boom of the 1950s. Aided as well by the construction of highways to serve the area, factories such as the Westinghouse Electric Corporation plant on Genesee Street were built here (since demolished). The plant generated employment to the area for many decades. The town maintains a strong blue-collar presence. Cheektowaga has a large Polish-American community, much of which relocated from Buffalo's East Side, and about 39.9% of population is of Polish heritage.

The Walden Galleria opened in 1989, becoming the Buffalo Niagara region's largest mall.

Cheektowaga is home to St. John Gualbert's Parish, which is a small Catholic church housing the Shrine of the Holy Relics of the Saints, believed to be one of the largest collections in the United States.

Garrison Cemetery, Our Lady Help of Christians Chapel, and Villa Maria Motherhouse Complex are listed on the National Register of Historic Places.

== Geography ==
According to the United States Census Bureau, the town has a total area of 29.5 square miles (76.4 km^{2}), of which 29.4 square miles (76.2 km^{2}) is land and 0.1 square miles (0.2 km^{2}), or 0.21%, is water.

The town is bordered by Lancaster on the east, West Seneca on the south, the city of Buffalo on the west, and on the north by Amherst. The town includes the waterways of Scajaquada Creek, Cayuga Creek and Ellicott Creek.

=== Neighborhoods ===
- Bellevue – A neighborhood between Union Road and the Depew border. It is home to the Bellevue Fire Department and a portion of Cayuga Creek. It is also home to the historic Bellevue Hotel, a local bar and restaurant which has been in existence since the 19th century.
- Cheektowaga – A census-designated place corresponding to all of the town outside the villages of Sloan and Depew.
- Cleveland Hill – A neighborhood located on the north town line; has its own school district.
- Depew – The village of Depew (shared with the town of Lancaster) is in the eastern part of the town.
- Doyle – A neighborhood in the Southwestern Corner of Town, bordered by the city of Buffalo's Kaisertown neighborhood, and Town of West Seneca's Clinton Gardens neighborhood.
- Forks – A former hamlet near Union Road (NY-277) and Broadway (NY-130).
- Maryvale – A neighborhood located just west of the airport, this community is also a school district, containing Maryvale High School.
- Pine Hill – A neighborhood on the border of Buffalo, featuring many cemeteries and Villa Maria College.
- Reinstein Woods Nature Preserve – A conservation area in the south central part of the town.
- Sloan – The village of Sloan, near the Buffalo border. Sloan is the seat of the Cheektowaga-Sloan school district.
- South Cheektowaga / South Line – Neighborhood on the border of West Seneca near French Road and extending towards Stiglmeier Park. Several apartment complexes are located in this area.
- U-Crest – A neighborhood near Union Road (NY-277) and Genesee Street (NY-33).
- Walden – a former name for the neighborhood along Walden Avenue (NY 952Q) next to the Buffalo city line.
- Williamsville – A small part of the village of Williamsville (shared with the town of Amherst)

=== Fire Districts ===
The Town of Cheektowaga is served by 9 Volunteer Fire districts with 10 companies, and 12 Stations, and 2 Volunteer Municipal Fire Departments with 2 stations within the Town Doyle 1 and 2, Rescue Hose, U-Crest Fire, Forks, Bellevue, South Line, Cleveland Hill, Hy-View, Pine Hill, Sloan Active Hose.

=== Weather hazards ===
On July 30, 1987, an F1 tornado touched down in the Union Road and George Urban Boulevard area. It grew to an F2 before dissipating. Homes and business suffered serious damage, but there were no fatalities or severe injuries. This tornado is locally memorable as the one which ripped the roof off the Holiday Showcase Restaurant and damaged a nearby Putt Putt miniature golf center.

On June 30, 2006, another F1 tornado touched down not far from the site of the 1987 tornado. Again, homes and businesses - including the Holiday Showcase, which was remodeled soon after - were damaged, and a tractor trailer was knocked over on the NY State Thruway, but no one was killed.

The Town also falls into the significant "Lake Effect" Snow band that crosses the area, and has been effected by historic Snow events including The Blizzard of '77, the Blizzard of '85, "The October Surprise","Snowvember", and the 2022 Christmas blizzard.

== Demographics ==
Historical population
| Census | Pop. | Note | %± |
|---|---|---|---|
| 1840 | 1,137 | | — |
| 1850 | 3,042 | | 167.5% |
| 1860 | 2,743 | | −9.8% |
| 1870 | 2,465 | | −10.1% |
| 1880 | 2,327 | | −5.6% |
| 1890 | 2,974 | | 27.8% |
| 1900 | 5,156 | | 73.4% |
| 1910 | 7,620 | | 47.8% |
| 1920 | 11,923 | | 56.5% |
| 1930 | 20,849 | | 74.9% |
| 1940 | 25,006 | | 19.9% |
| 1950 | 45,354 | | 81.4% |
| 1960 | 84,056 | | 85.3% |
| 1970 | 113,844 | | 35.4% |
| 1980 | 109,442 | | −3.9% |
| 1990 | 99,314 | | −9.3% |
| 2000 | 94,019 | | −5.3% |
| 2010 | 88,226 | | −6.2% |
| 2020 | 89,877 | | 1.9% |
Historical Population Figures; Cheektowaga (town)

As of the census of 2000, there were 94,019 people, 40,045 households, and 25,869 families residing in the town. The population density was 3,183.8 inhabitants per square mile (1,229.3/km^{2}). There were 41,901 housing units at an average density of 1,418.9 per square mile (547.8/km^{2}). The racial makeup of the town was 94.94% White, 2.93% Black or African American, 0.16% Native American, 0.94% Asian, 0.01% Pacific Islander, 0.27% from other races, and 0.75% from two or more races. Hispanic or Latino of any race were 0.97% of the population.

There were 40,045 households, out of which 25.5% had children under the age of 18 living with them, 49.5% were married couples living together, 11.4% had a female householder with no husband present, and 35.4% were non-families. 30.4% of all households were made up of individuals, and 15.5% had someone living alone who was 65 years of age or older. The average household size was 2.32 and the average family size was 2.91.

In the town, the population was spread out, with 20.6% under the age of 18, 7.1% from 18 to 24, 28.6% from 25 to 44, 23.2% from 45 to 64, and 20.5% who were 65 years of age or older. The median age was 41 years. For every 100 females, there were 88.4 males. For every 100 females age 18 and over, there were 84.6 males.

The median income for a household in the town was $38,121, and the median income for a family was $46,646. Males had a median income of $34,538 versus $25,434 for females. The per capita income for the town was $19,627. About 4.6% of families and 6.5% of the population were below the poverty line, including 8.7% of those under age 18 and 6.4% of those age 65 or over.

Major ancestries in the town are Polish (39.9%), German (29.9%), Italian (16.0%), Irish (14.1%), English (5.8%), and French (2.7%).

== Education ==
=== Higher education ===
There are two separate higher educational institutions with campuses in the town.

- Villa Maria College
- Empire State University

=== Public schools ===
There are eight separate public school districts within the town.

- Cheektowaga Central School District
- Cheektowaga-Sloan Union Free School District
- Cleveland Hill Union Free School District
- Depew Union Free School District
- Lancaster Central School District
- Maryvale Union Free School District
- West Seneca Central School District
- Williamsville Central School District

== Media ==
The town is served by media in Buffalo.

=== Newspapers ===
Cheektowaga's weekly newspaper is the Cheektowaga Bee. It was founded in 1977 and is published by Bee Group Newspapers in Williamsville, New York.

=== Digital-only news ===
The town's first daily hyperlocal news outlet, Cheektowaga Chronicle, launched in February 2017. It is published by Crabapple Media, LLC. The outlet has since ceased operation as of April 2019.

== Infrastructure ==
The east town line is marked by New York State Route 78 (Transit Road). New York State Route 240 (Harlem Road) and New York State Route 277 (Union Road) are major north-south routes through the town. New York State Route 33 (Kensington Expressway), Walden Avenue, and William Street access the New York State Thruway (Interstate 90}, which is also runs north-south through the town, traveling from the Amherst town line in the north, south to the West Seneca town line in the southwest corner of town. New York State Route 130 (Broadway) is an east-west roadway from the Buffalo city line to the Depew village line. Interstate 190, travels in the town from I-90 to Buffalo City Line and beyond into Downtown Buffalo and north to Niagara Falls. U.S. Route 20 (Transit Road) is a north-south roadway that runs concurrently with NY 78 along Cheektowaga's east border with Lancaster, south of Depew. New York State Route 354 (Clinton Street) is an east-west roadway through the extreme southwest corner of town, and provides the southern border with West Seneca.

== Economy ==
Calspan is based in Cheektowaga.

== Notable people ==
- Andrew Anderson, retired pro basketball player who graduated from Maryvale High School in Cheektowaga
- Christine Baranski, actress (The Good Wife, Mamma Mia!)
- Ryan Ciminelli, professional bowler
- William Fichtner, actor, Graduate of Maryvale High School
- Jackson C. Frank, folk musician who survived the Cleveland Hill Elementary fire
- Dennis H. Gabryszak, former New York State Assemblyman who previously served as town supervisor
- Dennis Gorski, former Erie County Executive
- Mickey Harmon, artist and activist
- William J. Hochul, Jr., U.S. Attorney who graduated from Cheektowaga Central
- Liz Johnson, professional bowler and USBC Hall of Famer
- Chelsea Noble, actress and wife of actor Kirk Cameron
- Danny Ozark, former manager of the Philadelphia Phillies
- Mark Pawlak, poet and educator
- Randy Pikuzinski, retired pro soccer player
- Ed Rutkowski, former pro football player and Erie County Executive
- Altemio Sanchez, serial murderer
- Paul Tokasz, retired New York State Assemblyman
- David J. Weber, historian
- Angela Wozniak, former New York State Assemblywoman, former town council member

== Twin towns – sister cities ==
Cheektowaga is twinned with:

- Łowicz, Poland
