= Depew, New York =

Depew
- Village
- Village of Depew
- Seal
- Motto: "The Village of Unexcelled Opportunity" Depew
- Location in Erie County and the state of New York
- Coordinates: 42°54′42″N 78°42′6″W
- Country: United States
- State: New York
- County: Erie
- Towns: Cheektowaga-Lancaster
- Named for: Chauncey Depew

Government
  - Mayor: Kevin Peterson

Area
  - Total: 5.08 sq mi (13.15 km^{2})
  - Land: 5.08 sq mi (13.15 km^{2})
  - Water: 0 sq mi (0.00 km^{2})
- Elevation: 673 ft (205 m)

Population (2020)
  - Total: 15,178
  - Density: 2,989.9/sq mi (1,154.42/km^{2})
- Time zone: UTC-5 (Eastern (EST))
  - Summer (DST): UTC-4 (EDT)
- ZIP code: 14043
- Area code: 716
- FIPS code: 36-20313
- GNIS feature ID: 0948333
- Website: www.villageofdepew.org

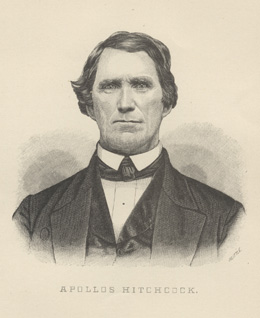
Apollos Hitchcock

Depew (/dəˈpju/) is a village in Erie County, New York. As of the 2020 census, Depew had a population of 15,178. It is part of the Buffalo–Niagara Falls metropolitan area. The village is named for Chauncey Depew, a politician and one of the original investors who bought the land for the village, which was incorporated in 1894.

The village extends across the boundary between the towns of Lancaster and Cheektowaga. The village lies on both sides of NY Route 78 (Transit Road), a major north-south route.

Village residents voted on January 17, 2017, to not dissolve the Village of Depew into the Towns of Lancaster and Cheektowaga, by a margin of 3,006–1,165.

== Geography ==
Depew is located at 42°54′42″N 78°42′6″W (42.911758, -78.701600).

According to the United States Census Bureau, the village has a total area of 5.1 square miles (13 km^{2}), all land.

Depew straddles the towns of Lancaster and Cheektowaga and is 11 miles (18 km) east of downtown Buffalo. Depew is bordered to the east by the village of Lancaster.

== History ==
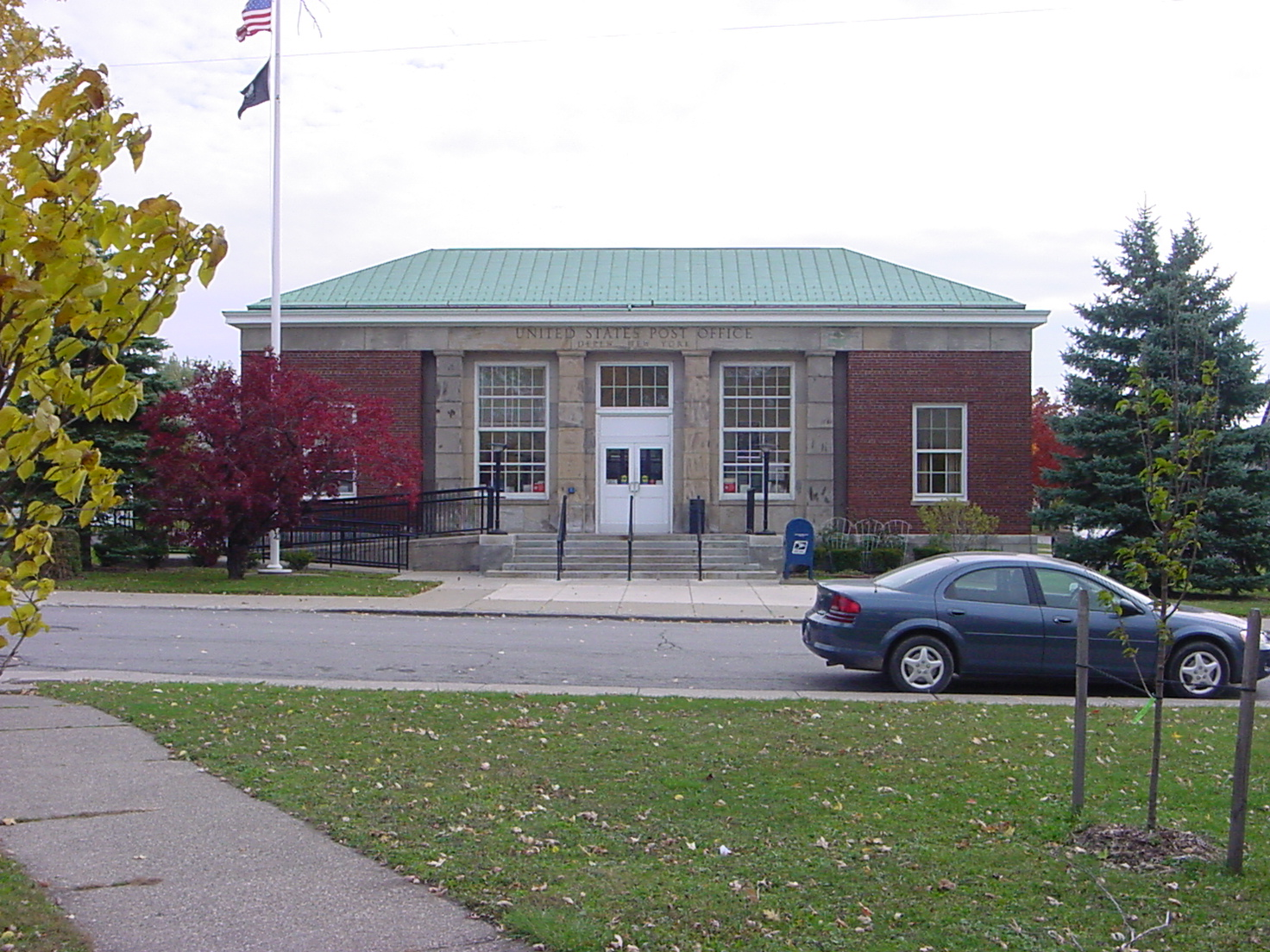
U.S. Post Office - Depew

Part of the area that Depew currently inhabits was first settled in 1808 by Apollos Hitchcock, just north of Cayuga Creek on the main road that connected Buffalo (spelled as "Buffaloe" at the time) with Lancaster village in what was then Jukdowaageh (now Cheektowaga), which some say meant "land of the crab apple" or "land of fruit and flowers". The land had been bought and surveyed by the Holland Land Company.

The following is from Our County and Its People A Descriptive Work of Erie County New York, edited by Truman C. White:

"Depew lies partly in Lancaster and partly in the town of Cheektowaga, but its history is so thoroughly identified with the territory under consideration that it may properly be treated wholly within this chapter. It was named in honor of Chauncey M. Depew, president of the New York Central and Hudson River Railroad Company, to which it owes its existence. That great corporation decided upon this site as a permanent location for its shops and auxiliary establishments, and on May 17, 1892, ground was broken. This was the signal for a general real estate boom in the vicinity. The great shops, covering about six acres, were first opened on April 1, 1893, with forty employees. Before the close of the year 1893 the following establishments had been completed or were well under way: The National Car Wheel Works, the Gould Coupler Company (occupying over six acres), and the Union Car Company (occupying about ten acres). The brass works were burned May 23, 1895, but immediately rebuilt. The first dwelling house was erected in April, 1893, and on May 1 of the same year John T. Lyman and George M. Beeman began the publication of the Depew Herald, which has had several proprietors, the present one being John T. Earl. In 1893 sixteen houses were erected, more than nine miles of plank sidewalk and 6,000 feet of sewers were laid, a fire company was organized, the New Palmer House by Alexander Stoddard and the Cleveland House by William Cleveland were built, and the water works were constructed by the Depew and Lancaster Water Works Company, of which Henry Koons was the first president.

On July 23, 1894, the village was incorporated, and the first officers elected August 21, were Dr. William Fairbanks, president; John Zurbrick, George Waltz and John Graney, trustees; Anthony Hartung, treasurer; Martin Kiefer, collector; J. N. Oswald, clerk. The corporate limits are about two and one-fourth miles square, and the population is about 2,800. In this year (1894) a hose company was organized, the plants of the Buffalo Cleaning and Dyeing Company and the Depew Brewing Company were established, the hardware store of Pratt & Matthews was opened, and the brick block of E. J. Durbin was erected. Union free school district No. 7, of Cheektowaga, taking in a part of the old district No. 4, Lancaster, was also organized, the first president being Franklin Zurbrick. At this time four schools were kept in the village. A brick school house was built on the south side in 1894-95 and another on the north side in 1895, each costing $10,000. The first principal was C. A. Walker. In 1894 the Depew Natural Gas Company was organized and began furnishing gas for lighting and fuel; three wells have been sunk on the north side. The Methodist Episcopal Society was organized July 6, 1894, with E. J. Durbin, B. C. Stoddard and A. W. Southall, trustees; an edifice was erected in 1895.

By February, 1895, the village had a population of 1,814, and by May about 500 dwellings had been erected and few large establishments were in operation employing 2,500 men. Transit Street was macadamized in this year, the German Lutheran church was built, and in December the Swedish Evangelical Lutheran Emmaus Society was organized. A Roman Catholic church and an independent Polish Catholic church were erected in 1896. In 1893 a post-office was established with W. W. Turley as postmaster; he was followed by John Graney and he by Robert Hunter.

Depew has stations on the New York Central, the D., L. & W., the Erie and the Lehigh Valley Railroads; the latter constructed a branch direct to Tonawanda in 1895-96. The Depew Terminal Railroad was built from Depew to Blasdell in 1897. The Depew loop of the Buffalo, Bellevue & Lancaster Electric Railway was opened in 1894. Much of the growth of the village is due to the Depew Improvement Company, which donated the school, and church sites, and which was largely succeeded in 1897 by the Depew Syndicate, capitalized at $100,000."

Named after Chauncey Depew, the village was founded and it became a hub of rapid growth. Founded in 1892 as a rail center, the Village of Depew was incorporated on July 23, 1894. The Depew economy in the 19th century was based primarily on railroad-related industries, such as the Gould Coupler Company, manufacturers of knuckle-type railroad couplers.

In 1904, Quebec political figure William Clendinneng died in Depew after being hit by a train.

Depew High School has a long-standing rivalry, starting in 1919, with Lancaster High School. The rivalry between has been strong and it is still a great battle between the smaller school versus the larger school despite the fact that Lancaster has won a majority of the games between the two rivals.

Shops in Depew, NY in approximately the 1950s, showing Bright Spot Pottery and Depew Pharmacy

== Notable people ==
- Joe Andreessen, Buffalo Bills linebacker
- Lucille Clifton, poet who was born and raised in Depew
- Pat Dobson, former MLB pitcher was born in Depew and attended Lancaster High School
- Dennis H. Gabryszak, New York state assemblyman
- Don Majkowski, former Green Bay Packers quarterback, born and raised in Depew and attended Depew High School
- B. John Tutuska, former Erie County executive
- Dale Volker, former New York state senator

== Government officials ==
Kevin Peterson is the current mayor. Andrew Adolf is the current Deputy Mayor. Patrick Deleney is the current chairman of the Zoning Board of Appeals. Arthur Domino is the current village historian. Trustees include Janelle Kraft.

== Historic places ==
The United States Post Office contains a mural, Beginning of the Day, painted in 1941 by Anne Poor and was listed on the National Register of Historic Places in 1988. Federally commissioned murals were produced from 1934 to 1943 in the United States through the Section of Painting and Sculpture, later called the Section of Fine Arts, of the Treasury Department.

== Demographics ==
Historical population
Census	Pop.	Note	%±
1900	3,379		—
1910	3,921		16.0%
1920	5,850		49.2%
1930	6,536		11.7%
1940	6,084		−6.9%
1950	7,217		18.6%
1960	13,580		88.2%
1970	22,158		63.2%
1980	19,819		−10.6%
1990	17,673		−10.8%
2000	16,629		−5.9%
2010	15,303		−8.0%
2020	15,178		−0.8%
U.S. Decennial Census

=== 2020 census ===
As of the 2020 census, Depew had a population of 15,178. The median age was 41.6 years. 18.2% of residents were under the age of 18 and 19.7% of residents were 65 years of age or older. For every 100 females there were 91.7 males, and for every 100 females age 18 and over there were 90.9 males age 18 and over.

100.0% of residents lived in urban areas, while 0.0% lived in rural areas.

There were 6,880 households in Depew, of which 23.0% had children under the age of 18 living in them. Of all households, 40.2% were married-couple households, 20.5% were households with a male householder and no spouse or partner present, and 30.3% were households with a female householder and no spouse or partner present. About 34.4% of all households were made up of individuals and 13.8% had someone living alone who was 65 years of age or older.

There were 7,270 housing units, of which 5.4% were vacant. The homeowner vacancy rate was 0.8% and the rental vacancy rate was 4.2%.

Racial composition as of the 2020 census
Race	Number	Percent
White	13,663	90.0%
Black or African American	380	2.5%
American Indian and Alaska Native	40	0.3%
Asian	277	1.8%
Native Hawaiian and Other Pacific Islander	4	0.0%
Some other race	157	1.0%
Two or more races	657	4.3%
Hispanic or Latino (of any race)	529	3.5%

=== 2010 census ===
As of the 2010 census, there were 15,303 people, 6,832 households, and 4,625 families residing in the village. The population density was 3,282.0 inhabitants per square mile (1,267.2/km^{2}). There were 7,101 housing units at an average density of 1,401.5 per square mile (541.1/km^{2}). The racial makeup of the village was 93.70% White, 2.30% African American, 0.70% Native American, 0.50% Asian, 0.00% Pacific Islander, 0.18% from other races, and 1.90% from two or more races. Hispanic or Latino of any race were 0.73% of the population.

There were 6,669 households, out of which 27.4% had children under the age of 18 living with them, 51.7% were married couples living together, 12.1% had a female householder with no husband present, and 32.3% were non-families. 27.3% of all households were made up of individuals, and 12.4% had someone living alone who was 65 years of age or older. The average household size was 2.43 and the average family size was 2.96.

In the village, the population was spread out, with 22.0% under the age of 18, 7.2% from 18 to 24, 29.4% from 25 to 44, 24.1% from 45 to 64, and 17.3% who were 65 years of age or older. The median age was 40 years. For every 100 females, there were 92.8 males. For every 100 females age 18 and over, there were 90.1 males.

=== Income and poverty ===
The median income for a household in the village was $57,895, and the median income for a family was $50,021. Males had a median income of $35,219 versus $25,604 for females. The per capita income for the village was $19,914. About 3.6% of families and 5.4% of the population were below the poverty line, including 7.3% of those under age 18 and 3.0% of those age 65 or over.

=== Health ===
According to the New York State Department of Health, residents of the Village of Depew report instances of psychosis and schizotypal personality disorder 28% higher than the statewide average and incidence of Alzheimer's disease 42% higher than the statewide average, adjusted for population.

== Adjacent cities and towns ==
- Town of Cheektowaga - west, southwest, northwest
- Town of Lancaster - east, southeast, northeast
- Village of Lancaster - east

== Transportation ==
- Depew hosts the Buffalo-Depew Amtrak station just inside its western border with Cheektowaga. The main train station for the Buffalo area, it is served by the Lake Shore Limited (Chicago to New York City/Boston), Maple Leaf (Toronto to New York City), and Empire Service (Niagara Falls, NY to New York City).
- U.S. Route 20 (Transit Road, Broadway), U.S. Route 20 runs east-west; however, when entering te Village of Depew concurrent with NY 78 on Transit, it runs north-south. US 20 ends concurrency with NY 78 at Broadway and turns east to travel into the Village of Lancaster.
- New York State Route 78 (Transit Road), north-south route through Depew, runs concurrently with US 20 south of village.
- New York State Route 130 (Broadway), east-west roadway through the village from the Cheektowaga town line at the west to NY 130's end at Transit Rd. (US 20/NY 78). Broadway continues east into Village of Lancaster as US 20.
- New York State Route 952Q (Walden Avenue), East-West highway through the village from Cheektowaga to Lancaster. Walden is the longest non-parkway reference route in New York. Walden's reference route number is not signed, but still has reference markers, and is maintained by New York State Department of Transportation (NYSDOT) as other signed routes are.

== Education ==
Depew is divided between several school districts. Much of Depew is in Depew Union Free School District, while other parts are in Lancaster Central School District, Cheektowaga-Maryvale Union Free School District, and Cheektowaga Central School District.

== See also ==
- Buffalo–Depew station
- Chauncey Depew
