= Edward Rath =

Edward Rath may refer to:

- Edward Rath III, member of the New York State Senate
- Edward A. Rath, American politician, county executive of Erie County, New York
