= 1990 New York State Comptroller election =

- November 6, 1990
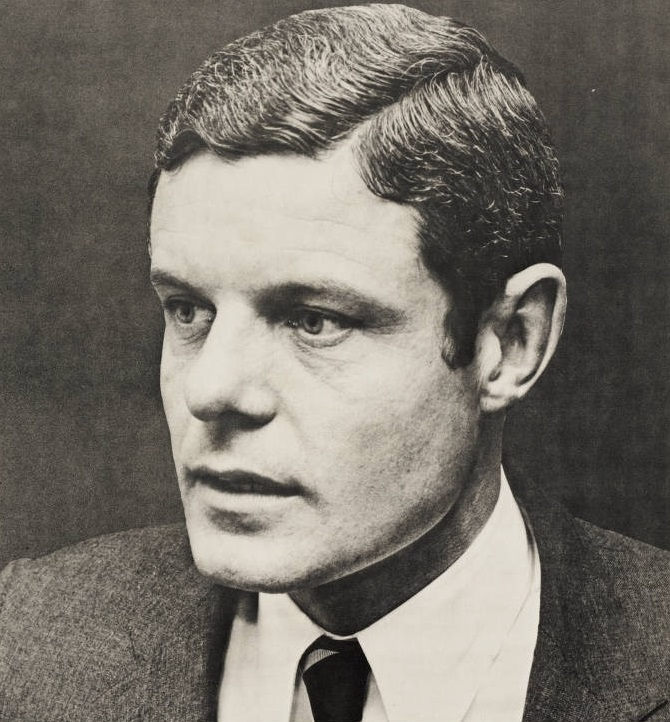

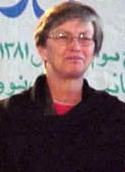
Nominee	Edward Regan	Carol Bellamy
Party	Republican	Democratic
Alliance	Conservative	Liberal
Popular vote	1,942,911	1,841,826
Percentage	49.24%	46.68%
- County results Regan: 40–50% 50–60% 60–70% 70-80% Bellamy: 50–60% 60–70% 70–80%
New York Comptroller before election
Edward Regan
Republican
Elected New York Comptroller
Edward Regan
Republican

The 1990 New York State Comptroller election took place on November 6, 1990. Republican nominee and incumbent Comptroller Edward Regan narrowly defeated Democratic nominee Carol Bellamy, winning a fourth term in office. He staved off attacks from Carol Bellamy that he was an "ineffective watchdog", though such hefty competition made this his closest race in 12 years.

Carol Bellamy was also described by The New York Times as Regan's "most serious challenge to Regan in his 12 years in office". This was in part due to investigations into Regan that, while not producing any charges, resulted in serious public scandal and the release of an embarrassing memorandum from one of his aides. The result of this was attacks from Bellamy that Regan had rewarded contributors with "fat contracts". Regan also produced counter-attacks on the Bellamy campaign, accusing Bellamy of accepting nearly $40,000 from Carl C. Icahn. As of 2026, this is the last time a Republican was elected New York State Comptroller.

== Democratic primary ==
=== Candidates ===
- Andrew J. Spano, Westchester County Clerk
- Carol Bellamy, Former President of the New York City Council

=== Debates ===
Andrew J. Spano (Westchester County Clerk) was reluctant to attack Carol Bellamy in the primary debates, with both candidates primarily aiming their rhetorical fire at republican incumbent Edward V. Regan. Instead, both candidates emphasized their personal strengths in the primary debates, of which there were presumably several.

In one of the debates (this one held after the one referenced earlier), both Spano and Bellamy attacked Governor Mario Cuomo for usage of "one time revenue sources and taping money from the pension funds to ... balance the budget", prompting a response from the Governor's press secretary that the two Democrats were "not well informed". There was also in this debate one attack made, against Carol Bellamy. Andrew Spano argued that Bellamy had "twisted arms" in the Democratic State Convention (held in June) in order to get on the ballot. Bellamy refuted this by reasserting that she was "independent".

=== Democratic fundraising & name recognition ===
As of September 3, 1990, prior to the occurrence of the primary, Bellamy had gathered roughly $700,000 in campaign contributions. Spano had collected $160,000, but his outstripped the $30,000 in cash that he had on hand. Polling as of this date also indicated that Bellamy had a greater level of name recognition than Spano.

=== Results ===
Bellamy won every county in the state except for two: Clinton County and Sparrow's home county of Westchester.

Democratic Party Primary Results 99% Reporting
Party	Candidate	Votes	%
Democratic	Carol Bellamy	241,737	71.0%
Democratic	Andrew J. Spano	98,146	29.0%
Total votes		339,883	100.00%

== General election ==
=== Candidates ===
- Edward V. Regan, Incumbent Comptroller and former Erie County Executive (Republican)
- Carol Bellamy, former President of the New York City Council (Democrat)
- Donna M. Kearney (Right to Life)
- Vicki Kirkland (Libertarian)
- Aaron Ruby (Socialist Workers)
- Emmy Gay (New Alliance)

=== Voter turnout ===
Regan was carried to victory on the backs of Suburban and Upstate voters, which turned out in stronger numbers as a result of the 2 billion dollar environmental bond act. Further, turnout among upstate voters was roughly 55% of eligible voters, while turnout among eligible voters in New York City was only 36%.

=== Results ===
1990 New York State Comptroller Election
Party	Candidate	Votes	%	±%
Republican	Edward Regan (incumbent)	1,942,911	49.24%	N/A
Democratic	Carol Bellamy	1,841,826	46.68%	N/A
Right to Life	Donna M. Kearney	116,743	2.96%	N/A
Libertarian	Vicki Kirkland	17,093	0.43%	N/A
New Alliance	Emmy Gay	15,752	0.40%	N/A
Socialist Workers	Aaron Ruby	11,118	0.28%	N/A
Total votes		3,945,443	100.00%	

== See also ==
Preceded by 1986	New York Comptroller election 1990	Succeeded by 1994
