= Lancaster School District =

Lancaster School District may refer to:

- Lancaster School District (California)
- Lancaster School District (Minnesota)
- Lancaster School District (South Carolina)
- Lancaster Central School District, New York
- School District of Lancaster, Pennsylvania
- Lancaster Independent School District, Texas
