= Tutuska =

Tutuska is a surname. Notable people with the surname include:

- B. John Tutuska (1911–1993), American politician
- George Tutuska (born 1965), American musician
