= Mary Lou Rath =

American politician (born 1937)

Member of the New York State Senate
- In office November 2, 1993 – December 31, 2008
- Preceded by: John B. Sheffer II
- Succeeded by: Michael Ranzenhofer
- Constituency: 60th district (1993–2002); 61st district (2003–2008)

Personal details
- Born: Mary Lou Schmitt; June 17, 1934 (age 92)
- Party: Republican
- Spouse: Edward Rath Jr. (1959-2003) (his death)
- Children: 3, including Edward Rath III
- Education: Buffalo State Teacher's College (BS)

Mary Lou Rath (née Schmitt) (born June 17, 1934) is an American politician who served as a member of New York State Senate from 1993 to 2008. A Republican, she represented the state's 61st district, which consisted of parts of Erie County and all of Genesee County.

== Early life and education ==
Rath was born in Kenmore, New York to Aloysius Casper "Lloyd" Schmitt and Margaret M. Cassidy. Her parents divorced and Rath's mother remarried to George Louis Whetzle. She attended the University at Buffalo before earning a Bachelor of Science degree from the Buffalo State Teacher's College (now Buffalo State College).

== Career ==
She was elected to the Senate in a special election in November 1993 after serving as a member of the Erie County Legislature from 1978 to 1993. During her final four years in the County Legislature, she served as the Minority Leader of the Legislature.

In January 2007, she was appointed to the post of deputy majority leader for state/federal relations, making her the only woman in the Senate Republican leadership. She announced her retirement in 2008 and was succeeded by Erie County Legislator Michael Ranzenhofer. Ranzenhofer had also succeeded Senator Rath as Minority Leader of the Erie County Legislature when Senator Rath stepped down to become a state senator.

During her service in the Senate, Rath served at different times as chairwoman of the Tourism, Recreation and Sports Development Committee, chairwoman of the Children and Families Committee and as chairwoman of the Local Government Committee.

In 1998, she was reportedly considered by Governor George Pataki as his running mate for lieutenant governor. Pataki choose Judge Mary Donohue instead.

== Personal life ==
Rath married her late husband, Edward Rath, Jr. (1930-2003), on January 10, 1959 in Buffalo, New York. Edward Rath, Jr. was a justice of the New York State Supreme Court and her father-in-law, Edward A. Rath, was the first county executive of Erie County. Her son, Edward Rath III, won his election for the Erie County Legislature for her former seat and in 2020 was elected in her seat for New York State Senate. She is a resident of the Village of Williamsville, and has two other children, Allison and Melinda.

Political offices
Preceded by Thomas M. Reynolds	Minority Leader of the Erie County Legislature; 1989–1993	Succeeded by Michael Ranzenhofer
New York State Senate
Preceded by John B. Sheffer II	New York State Senate, 60th District; 1993–2002	Succeeded by Byron Brown
Preceded by George Maziarz	New York State Senate, 61st District; 2003–2008	Succeeded by Michael Ranzenhofer
