= Joe Andreessen =

American football player (born 2000)

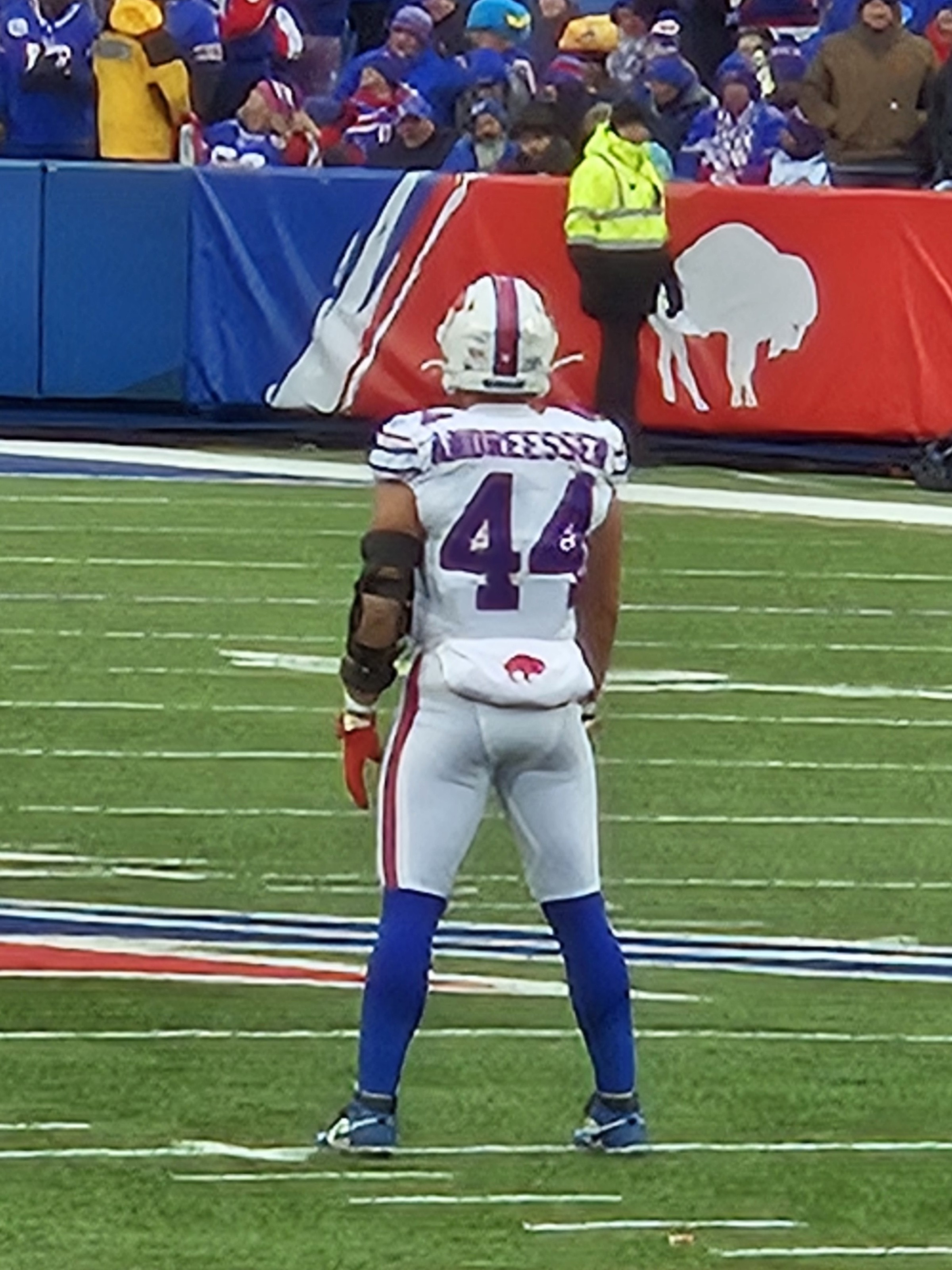
- Andreessen with the Buffalo Bills in 2025

No. 44 – Buffalo Bills
- Position: Linebacker
- Roster status: Active

Personal information
- Born: February 7, 2000 (age 26); Depew, New York, U.S.
- Listed height: 6 ft 1 in (1.85 m)
- Listed weight: 240 lb (109 kg)

Career information
- High school: Lancaster (Lancaster, New York)
- College: Bryant (2018–2022); Buffalo (2023)
- NFL draft: 2024: undrafted

Career history
- Buffalo Bills (2024–present)

Awards and highlights
- Associated Press FCS Second-team All-American (2022); First-team All-Big South Conference (2022); 2× First-team All-Northeast Conference (2020, 2021)

Career NFL statistics as of Week 11, 2026
- Total tackles: 75
- Stats at Pro Football Reference

Joseph Andreessen (born February 7, 2000) is an American professional football linebacker for the Buffalo Bills of the National Football League (NFL). He played college football for the Bryant Bulldogs before playing his final year for the Buffalo Bulls.

== Early life and college ==
A native of the Buffalo–Niagara Falls metropolitan area, Andreessen played little league football before playing for Lancaster High School, where he was noted for his work ethic and won numerous accolades, including Defensive Player of the Year in Western New York. He enrolled at Bryant University, the only school to offer him a football scholarship, before transferring to his hometown University at Buffalo as a graduate transfer. In his final year at Bryant, Andreessen was named an All-American after setting a school record with 112 tackles, ranking eighth in the FCS in 2022, and finishing third in career tackles in Bryant Bulldogs history. He then started 12 games for Buffalo the following year, leading the Bulls in tackles.

== Professional career ==
Pre-draft measurables
Height	Weight	Arm length	Hand span	Wingspan	40-yard dash	10-yard split	20-yard split	20-yard shuttle	Three-cone drill	Vertical jump	Broad jump	Bench press
6 ft 0 1/2 in (1.84 m)	240 lb (109 kg)	30 1/2 in (0.77 m)	9 1/8 in (0.23 m)	6 ft 2 5/8 in (1.90 m)	4.65 s	1.59 s	2.69 s	4.22 s	7.21 s	38.0 in (0.97 m)	10 ft 2 in (3.10 m)	32 reps
All values from Pro Day

After going undrafted in the 2024 NFL draft, Joe Andreessen was signed by his hometown Buffalo Bills on May 11, 2024, after a successful rookie minicamp tryout. Andressen started the second game of the preseason after Matt Milano and Terrel Bernard were sidelined due to injury and precaution, respectively. Playing against the Pittsburgh Steelers' starters and second-stringers, he had a strong performance, finishing with a team-high 12 tackles, including two tackles for loss, one of which was a fourth-down sack of Justin Fields. Quarterback Josh Allen nicknamed Andreessen "Buffalo Joe" following the performance, also paying homage to the latter's upbringing in Buffalo. Andreessen was named to the NFL's "All Preseason team" for his play in the preseason, later making the Bills' initial 53-man roster alongside fellow UB alumnus Ja'Marcus Ingram.

Andreessen's number 44 has historically only rarely been issued to players, being reserved (but not retired) in honor of Elbert Dubenion, a key contributor during the Bills' American Football League era; the number has historically been only used in the preseason and granted to players not expected to make a regular season roster.

Andreessen played mostly on special teams in his rookie season, occasionally playing defensive snaps as a reserve. He received extensive playing time during a week 17 blowout win over the New York Jets, finishing as the Bills' leading tackler in the game.

On October 3, 2026, Andreessen signed a two-year, $5 million contract extension.

== NFL career statistics ==
Legend
**Bold**	Career high

=== Regular season ===
Year	Team	Games		Tackles					Interceptions						Fumbles				
Year	Team	GP	GS	Cmb	Solo	Ast	Sck	TFL	Int	Yds	Avg	Lng	TD	PD	FF	Fmb	FR	Yds	TD
2024	BUF	13	1	26	12	14	0.0	1	0	0	0.0	0	0	0	0	0	0	0	0
2025	BUF	17	2	**35**	**14**	**21**	0.0	**2**	0	0	0.0	0	0	0	0	0	0	0	0
2026	BUF	10	0	14	7	7	0.0	0	0	0	0.0	0	0	0	0	0	0	0	0
Career		40	3	75	33	42	0.0	3	0	0	0.0	0	0	0	0	0	0	0	0

=== Postseason ===
Year	Team	Games		Tackles					Interceptions						Fumbles				
Year	Team	GP	GS	Cmb	Solo	Ast	Sck	TFL	Int	Yds	Avg	Lng	TD	PD	FF	Fmb	FR	Yds	TD
2024	BUF	3	0	**2**	**1**	**1**	0.0	0	0	0	0.0	0	0	0	0	0	0	0	0
2025	BUF	2	0	**2**	**1**	**1**	0.0	0	0	0	0.0	0	0	0	0	0	0	0	0
Career		5	0	4	2	2	0.0	0	0	0	0.0	0	0	0	0	0	0	0	0
