= Jack Phillips (first baseman) =

American baseball player (1921–2009)

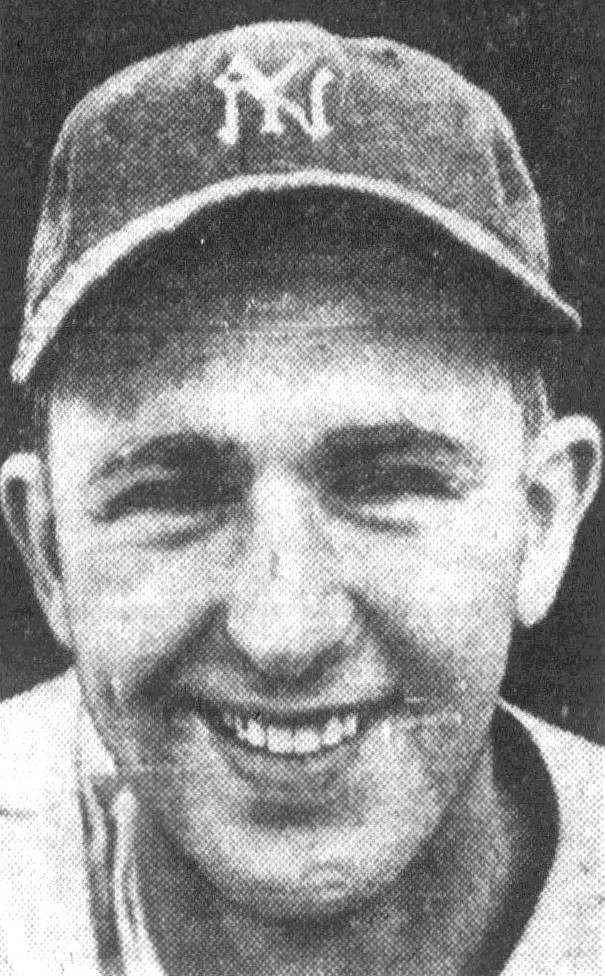
- Phillips, circa 1954
- First baseman
- Born: September 6, 1921; Clarence, New York, U.S.
- Died: August 30, 2009 (aged 87); Chelsea, Michigan, U.S.
- Batted: Right Threw: Right

MLB debut
- August 22, 1947, for the New York Yankees

Last MLB appearance
- April 25, 1957, for the Detroit Tigers

MLB statistics
- Batting average: .283
- Home runs: 9
- Runs batted in: 101
- Stats at Baseball Reference

Teams
- New York Yankees (1947–1949); Pittsburgh Pirates (1949–1952); Detroit Tigers (1955–1957)

Career highlights and awards
- World Series champion (1947)

Jack Dorn Phillips (September 6, 1921 – August 30, 2009) was an American professional baseball player whose career extended from 1943 to 1959. In the Major Leagues, he was a backup first baseman who played for three different teams between the 1947 and 1957 seasons. Listed at 6 ft 4 in (1.93 m) tall and 193 pounds (88 kg), Phillips batted and threw right-handed, and was nicknamed "Stretch" for his flexibility when covering first base.

== Early years ==
A native of Clarence, New York, Phillips graduated from Lancaster High School in 1939 and Clarkson University in 1943. He served in the US Navy during World War II.

== Baseball career ==
Phillips entered the majors in 1947 with the New York Yankees, playing for them two and half years joining the Pittsburgh Pirates (1949–52) and Detroit Tigers (1955–57). His most productive season came in 1956 with the Tigers, when he posted career numbers in home runs (5), runs scored (25) and runs batted in (34), while hitting for a .293 average in 69 games.

The highlight of Phillips’ career was his ultimate grand slam (a walk-off grand slam that erases a three-run deficit) on July 8, 1950, which he hit against the St. Louis Cardinals, with the ball tipping off the end of Stan Musial's glove as it went over the outfield fence. Through the end of the 2016 season, Phillips is one of just 28 players in major league history to hit an ultimate grand slam.

In a nine-season career, Phillips was a .283 hitter (252-for-892) in 343 games, including 111 runs, 101 RBIs, 42 doubles, 16 triples, nine home runs and five stolen bases.

A member of the 1947 World Champions New York Yankees, Phillips also earned Pacific Coast League MVP honors in 1954, after hitting .300 with 17 homers for Triple-A Hollywood Stars. In 11 minor league seasons, he hit a combined .278 in 1,212 games for five different teams between 1943 and 1959.

== Later years ==
After a brief minor league managerial career, Phillips returned to Clarkson University where he devoted himself to coaching baseball, spanning 24 seasons as the Golden Knights’ skipper, amassing nearly 200 victories. In 1992, Phillips was inducted into the Clarkson University Athletic Hall of Fame. On May 3, 2008, Phillips was further honored when the Golden Knights renamed their baseball facility Jack Phillips Stadium at Snell Field.

Phillips died in 2009 in Chelsea, Michigan, at the age of 87.

== See also ==
- List of Major League Baseball ultimate grand slams
