= Kathleen Waldron =

American academic administrator

Kathleen Waldron is an American academic administrator who served as president of William Paterson University of New Jersey (2010-2018) and president of Baruch College of the City University of New York (2004-2009) before retiring in 2018. She also served as Dean of the College of Business, Public Administration and Information Sciences at Long Island University from 1998 to 2004 and had an international banking career for 15 years. Waldron graduated from Stony Brook University in 1970 and received her doctorate in Latin American history from Indiana University in 1977. Waldron started her academic career as an assistant professor of Latin American history at Bowdoin College in Maine. During that time she obtained a Fulbright Fellowship and taught at the Universidad Catolica de Andres Bello in Caracas, Venezuela. Waldron left her academic career in 1980 and joined Chemical Bank in New York before moving to Citibank where she remained for 13 years. During that time, she led the strategic planning efforts of the global private banking division and also served as president of Citibank International in Miami from 1991-1996. Waldron developed the division's first comprehensive global executive training program before deciding to return to university life in 1998. At Baruch College, Waldron significantly increased the institution's endowment, raising over $50 million in her first year as president. At William Paterson University, she guided the 10,000 student public institution to become a leader in community cooperation, increasing student diversity while improving student retention and graduation rates. She oversaw the physical renovation of the campus and introduced new doctoral and masters' programs. Now retired as president emerita of William Paterson University, she continues to lecture and publish about leadership in higher education.

Waldron is the co-author of Higher Education Leadership: Pathways and Insights with Professor Sharmila Pixy Ferris of William Paterson University which was published in 2021. Waldron has presented at numerous academic and professional meetings including those held by the American Council of Education; HERS at Bryn Mawr; TIAA-CREF; the National Communication Association; the International Communication Association; the Lilly Foundation; and the American Historical Association. She also has spoken about issues in higher education on various television programs including NJ Spotlight and the Steve Adubato One on One show.

Waldron has extensive fundraising and board experience in business, the not-for-profit sector and higher education. She served on the board of Shands Hospital in Gainesville, Florida; the Hamilton Partnership for Paterson, creating a new national park; NJEDGE, a higher education tech consortium; the Tinker Foundation dedicated to promoting development and democracy in Latin America; the Commerce and Industry Association of New Jersey; the New Jersey Presidents Council; the New Jersey Association of State Colleges and Universities; the MetroTech BID in Brooklyn, New York, a community development agency; Accion, an international development non-governmental organization; and the Fulbright Association. She also served on the board of the Baruch Foundation and the boards of William Paterson University and the William Paterson Foundation.

Academic offices
Preceded by Edward Regan	President of Baruch College; 2004–2009	Succeeded by Stan Altman (interim)
