= Ja'Marcus Ingram =

American football player (born 1997)

No. 20 – Houston Texans
- Position: Cornerback
- Roster status: Active

Personal information
- Born: September 2, 1997 (age 29); Dallas, Texas, U.S.
- Listed height: 6 ft 2 in (1.88 m)
- Listed weight: 190 lb (86 kg)

Career information
- High school: South Oak Cliff (Dallas)
- College: Utah State (2017–2018); Texas Tech (2019–2020); Buffalo (2021)
- NFL draft: 2022: undrafted

Career history
- Buffalo Bills (2022–2025); Houston Texans (2025–present)

Career NFL statistics as of 2025
- Total tackles: 39
- Sacks: 1.0
- Pass deflections: 6
- Interceptions: 2
- Defensive touchdowns: 1
- Stats at Pro Football Reference

Ja'Marcus Ingram (born September 2, 1997) is an American professional football cornerback for the Houston Texans of the National Football League (NFL). He played college football for the Utah State Aggies, later transferring to Texas Tech before joining Buffalo as a graduate transfer. He signed with the Bills as an undrafted free agent on May 16, 2022.

== Early life and college ==
Ingram grew up in Carthage, Texas and then later moved to Dallas and attended South Oak Cliff High School. One of nine siblings, Ingram played receiver in high school, not making his varsity team until his senior year due to his small, 5'10", 140 lb. frame as a junior. After being unrecruited, he walked on at Utah State University, where he would play 37 games in two years with the Aggies as a starter. He later transferred to Texas Tech University, following head coach Matt Wells there, obtaining playing time as a backup for the Red Raiders and earning a degree in sociology before working on a master's degree. Due to the COVID-19 pandemic, Ingram was granted one final year of eligibility, which he chose to play at Buffalo over Central Arkansas as a graduate transfer. Ingram started 11 games for the Bulls. Ingram declared for the 2022 NFL Draft alongside his cousin, former Texas & USC and current Chiefs running back Keaontay Ingram. Ja’Marcus signed as an undrafted free agent with the Buffalo Bills and played in Buffalo from 2022 to midseason of 2025. He is now a member of the Houston Texans after being claimed off of waivers in late 2025.

== Professional career ==
Pre-draft measurables
Height	Weight	Arm length	Hand span	Wingspan	40-yard dash	10-yard split	20-yard split	20-yard shuttle	Three-cone drill	Vertical jump	Broad jump	Bench press
6 ft 1 in (1.85 m)	185 lb (84 kg)	31 5/8 in (0.80 m)	9 1/4 in (0.23 m)	6 ft 3 7/8 in (1.93 m)	4.60 s	1.54 s	2.60 s	4.34 s	7.06 s	36.0 in (0.91 m)	10 ft 5 in (3.18 m)	12 reps
All values from Pro Day

=== Buffalo Bills ===
Ingram signed with the Buffalo Bills as an undrafted free agent on May 16, 2022. Throughout his first two years, Ingram was mainly on the practice squad, being elevated to the active roster five times. In his two games in 2022, Ingram logged three total tackles, but failed to record stats in 2023 and mainly played on special teams.

After a strong preseason in 2024, Ingram finally made the Bills' initial 53-man roster alongside rookie linebacker and fellow undrafted UB alumnus Joe Andreessen. He made a crucial defensive play at the end of the Bills' season opener against the Arizona Cardinals, denying a last-second Hail Mary pass attempt from Kyler Murray and allowing Buffalo to hold on and win 34–28, thus preventing a repeat of the Hail Murray from four years earlier between the two teams. The following Thursday against the Miami Dolphins, Ingram, starting in place of injured slot corner Taron Johnson, recorded his first two career interceptions off of Dolphins quarterback Tua Tagovailoa, including one for his first career touchdown, as Buffalo won 31–10.

On December 3, 2025, Ingram was released by the Bills.

=== Houston Texans ===
On December 4, 2025, Ingram was claimed off waivers by the Houston Texans. Set to become a exclusive-rights free agent in the 2026 offseason, he re-signed with the Texans on March 3, 2026.
