= United States Post Office (Depew, New York) =

- US Post Office--Depew
- U.S. National Register of Historic Places
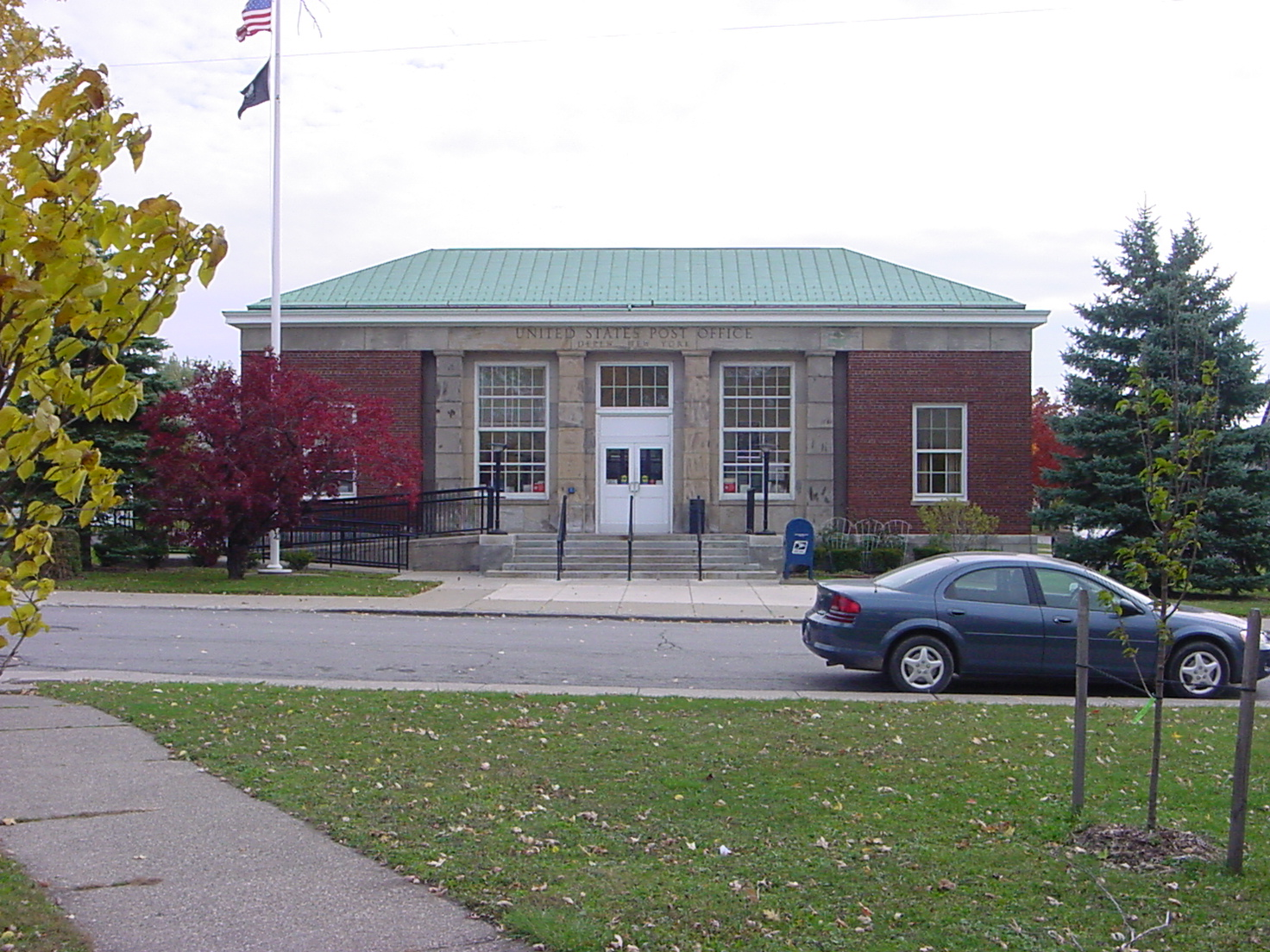
- U.S. Post Office, October 2009

- Location within New York Location within the United States
- Interactive map showing the location for U.S. Post Office-Depew
- Location: 165 Warsaw St. Depew, New York
- Coordinates: 42°54′14″N 78°41′25″W
- Built: 1938
- Architect: Louis A. Simon, Anne Poor
- Architectural style: Colonial Revival
- MPS: US Post Offices in New York State, 1858-1943, TR
- NRHP reference No.: 88002481
- Added to NRHP: November 17, 1988

US Post Office—Depew is a historic post office building located at Depew in Erie County, New York. It was designed and built 1938–1939, and is one of a number of post offices in New York State designed by the Office of the Supervising Architect of the Treasury Department, Louis A. Simon. The building is in the Colonial Revival style. The interior features a mural by Anne Poor painted in 1941 and titled "Beginning the Day."

It was listed on the National Register of Historic Places in 1989.
