= Depew Union Free School District =

School district in New York, United States

Location
- Depew, New York United States

District information
- Motto: Inspiring, Challenging, Achieving
- Grades: K-12
- Superintendent: Jeffrey R. Rabey
- Schools: 3

Students and staff
- Athletic conference: Section VI
- District mascot: Wildcats
- Colors: Blue and White

Other information
- Website: Depew Union Free School District

Depew Union Free School District is a school district in Depew, New York, United States. The superintendent is Jeffrey Rabey. The district operates three schools: Depew High School, Depew Middle School, and Cayuga Heights Elementary School.

== Administration ==
The district offices are located at 5201 Transit Road, inside of Depew High School and Middle School. The current superintendent is Mr. Jeffrey Rabey.

=== Selected former superintendents ===
- William F. Phelan
- Marco F. Guerra–1959-1974 (Director of Guidance - Depew High School, retired)
- George J. Drescher–1974-1988 (Principal - Cayuga Heights Elementary School, resigned)
- Raymond Morningstar [interim]–1988-1989 (Assistant Superintendent - Depew Union Free School District, retired)
- Judith P. Staples [interim] (Assistant Superintendent - Depew Union Free School District, returned to position)
- Peter M. Brenner–1990-1992 (Superintendent - Schulyersville Central School District, named Superintendent of Washingtonville Central School District)
- Eugene Hale–1992-1998 (Principal - Cayuga Heights Elementary School, retired)
- Merton L. Haynes–1998-1998 [interim] (Interim Superintendent - Alden Central School District, retired)
- Robert D. Olczak–1998-2001 (Superintendent - Starpoint Central School District, named Superintendent of Cattaraugus-Allegany BOCES)
- Robert F. Defilippo–2001-2007 (Assistant Superintendent - Depew Union Free School District, retired)
- Kimberly Mueller–2007-2010 (Director of Elementary Education - Lancaster Central School District, named Superintendent of Wellsville Central School District)
- Dennis Ford–2010 [interim] (Superintendent - Amherst Central School District, named Interim Superintendent of Akron Central School District)

== Depew Middle/High School ==
Depew Middle/High School
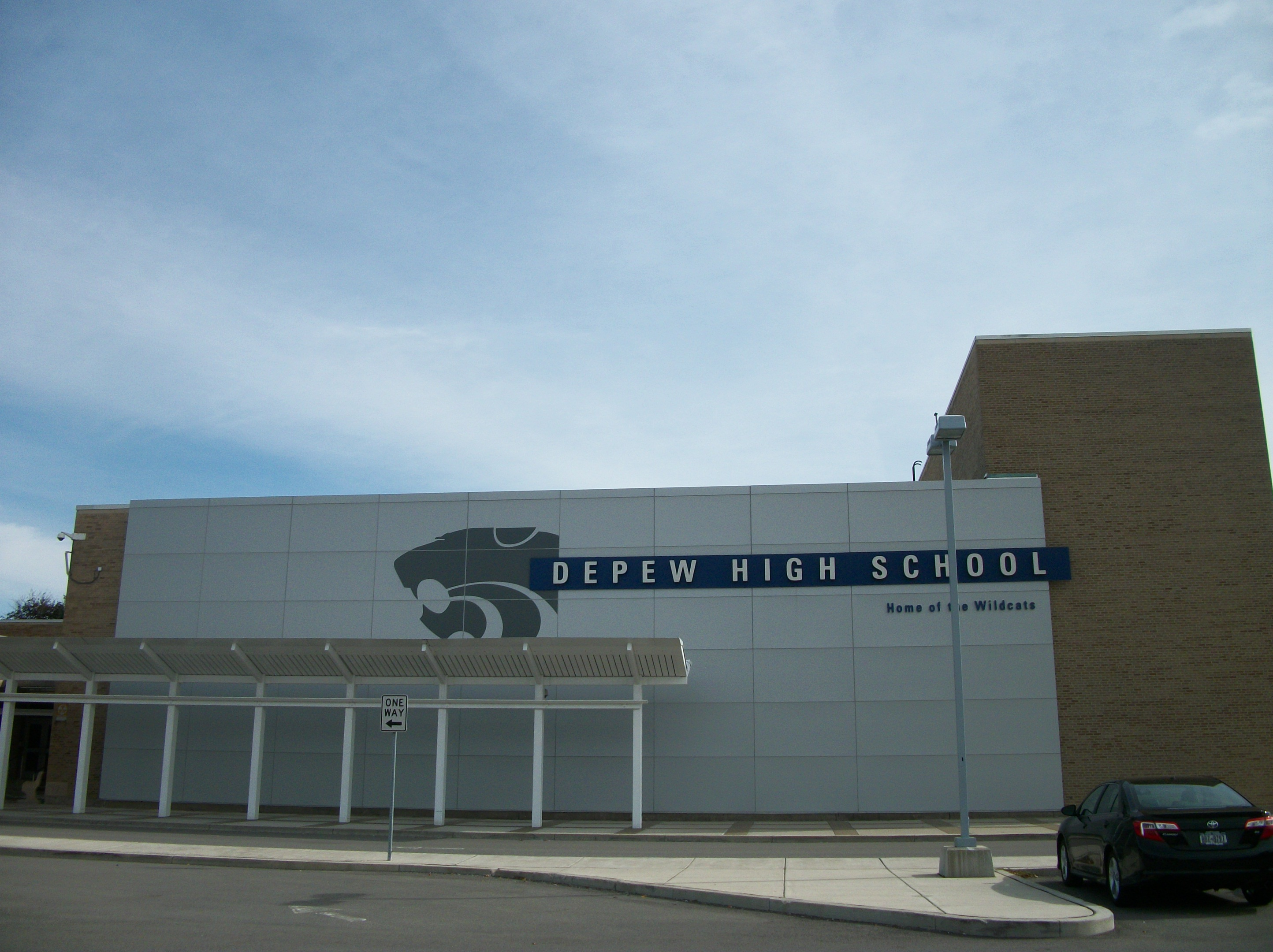

Location
- 5201 Transit Road

Information
- Motto: Once A Wildcat Always A Wildcat.
- NCES School ID: 360903000689
- Executive Principal: James J. Lupini
- Grades: 6-12
- Colors: Columbia blue and white
- Rival: Lancaster High School
- Yearbook: The Sentinel
- Website: Depew High School, Depew Middle School

Depew Middle/High School is located at 5201 Transit Road and serves grades 6 through 12. The current principal is Mr. James Lupini.

=== History ===
Depew High School was housed at Depew Central School until September 8, 1954 when the current building opened. It was dedicated on June 9, 1955. It consolidated with the middle school in 2020.

==== Selected former principals ====
Previous assignment and previous assignment denoted in parentheses

- Elizabeth W. Earle–1929-1954 (Teacher - Depew School, retired)
- Francis S. Kozub–1954-1979 (Social Studies teacher - Depew High School, retired)
- Robert Farkas–1980-1990 (Vice Principal - Depew High School, retired)
- George L. Morse–1990-1997 (Assistant Principal - Amherst Central High School, named Director of Curriculum & Instruction for Depew Union Free School District)
- Edward E. Balaban–1997-2003 (Assistant Principal - Olean High School, resigned)
- Carol A. Townsend–2003-2020 (Vice Principal - Depew High School, retired)

==== Notable alumni ====
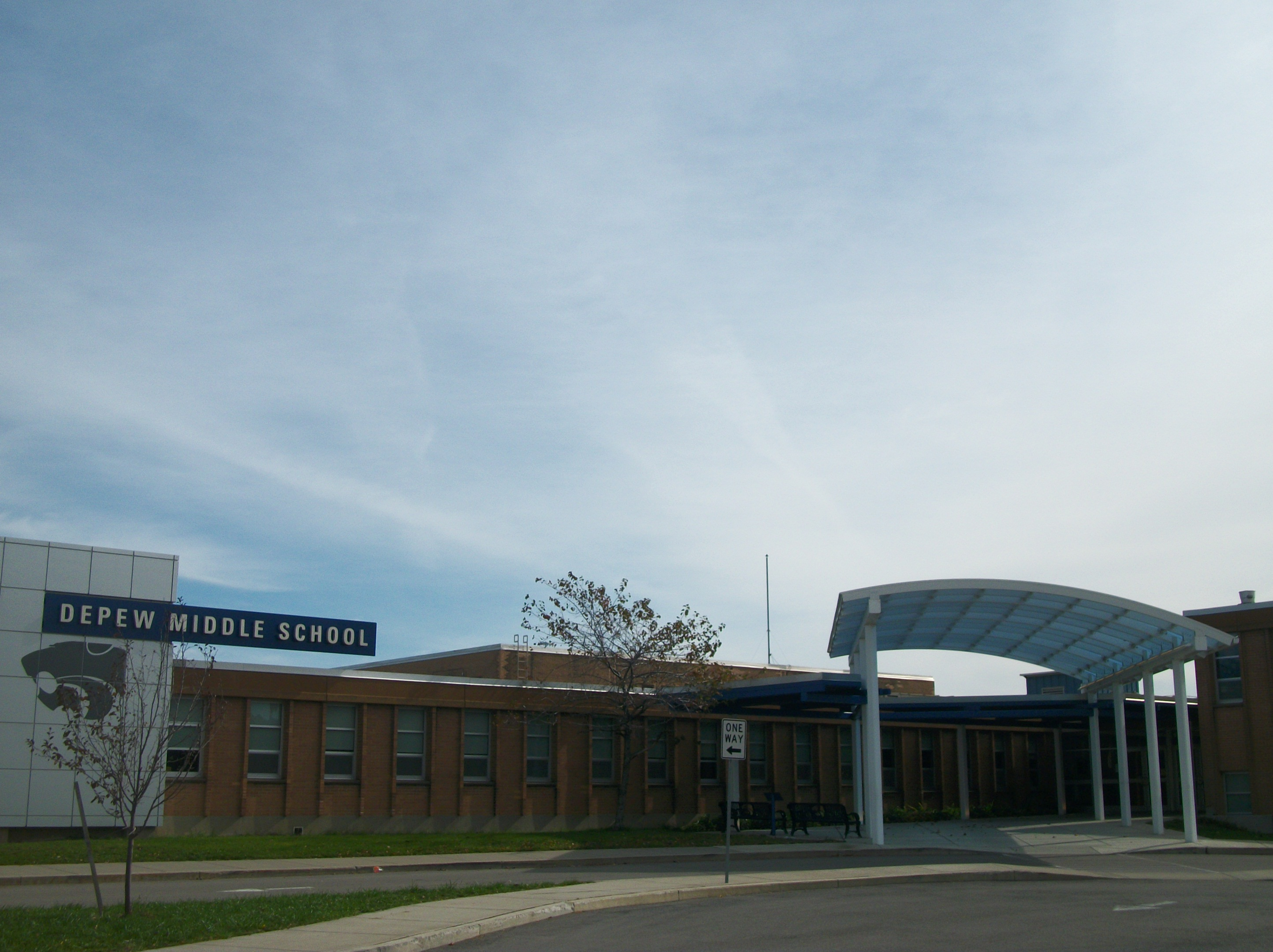
Depew Middle School entrance

- Don Majkowski– Former Green Bay Packers quarterback; Green Bay Packers Hall of Fame Inductee - Class of 2005

== Cayuga Heights Elementary ==
Cayuga Heights Elementary
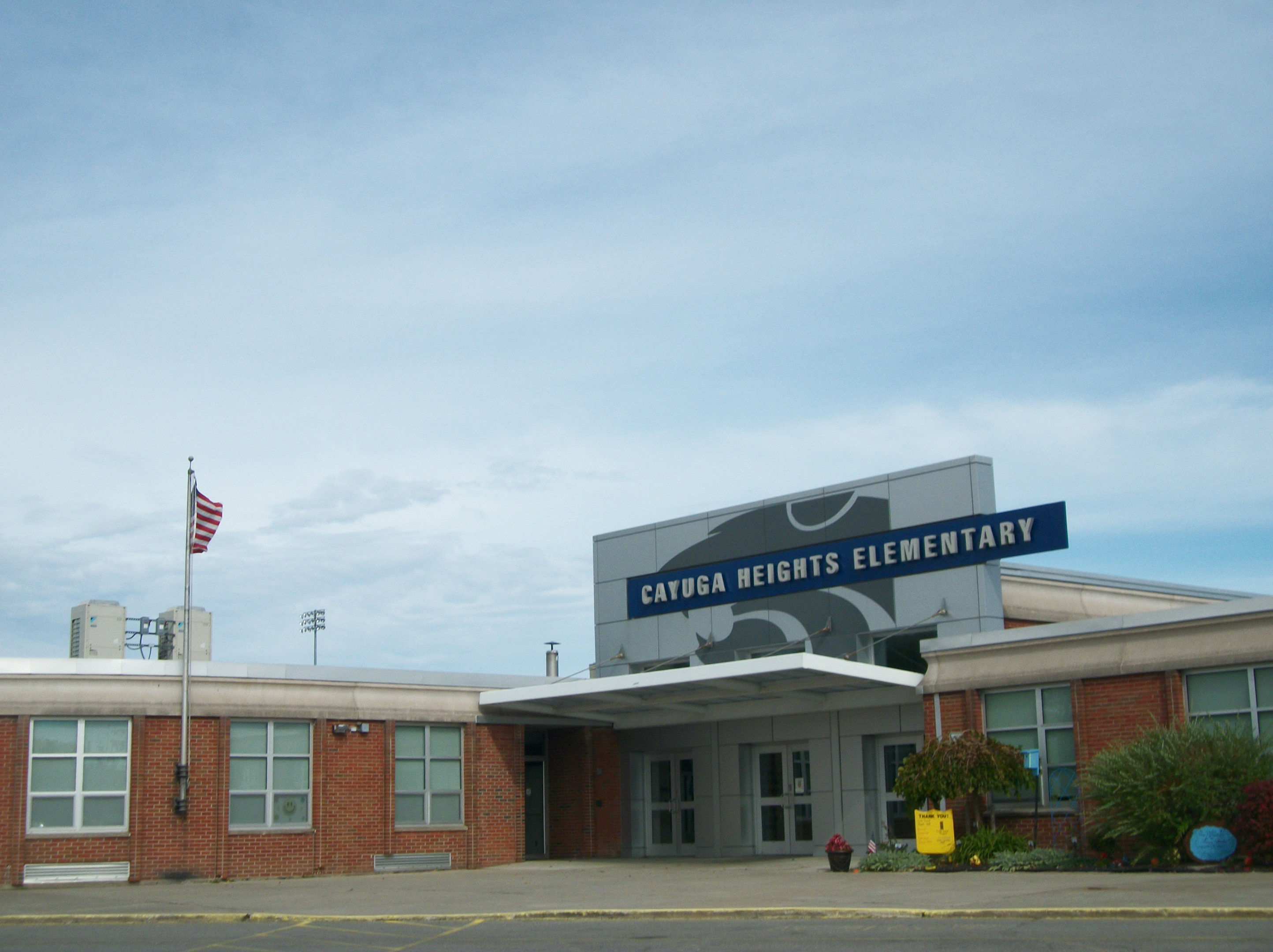

Location
- 1780 Como Park Boulevard

Information
- Principal: Michelle Kulda
- Grades: K-5
- Website: Cayuga Heights Elementary

Cayuga Heights Elementary is located at 1780 Como Park Boulevard and serves grades K through 5. The current principal is Michelle Kudla.

=== History ===
Cayuga Heights Elementary School was built and opened in 1970. The school was dedicated on November 22, 1970.

==== Selected former principals ====
Previous assignment and reason for departure denoted in parentheses

- George Drescher–1970-1974 (unknown, named Superintendent of Depew Union Free School District)
- Eugene Hale–1979-1992 (Music Coordinator - Depew Union Free School District, named Superintendent of Depew Union Free School District)
- Vicki Wright–1992-1995 (Principal - Fricano Elementary School, resigned)
- Timothy Olsen–1995-1999 (Teacher - Cloverbank Elementary School, named Director of Special Programs for Depew Union Free Schools)
- Robert J. Puchalski–1999-2011 (Assistant Principal - Cayuga Heights Elementary, placed on leave)
