= Michael Ranzenhofer =

American politician

Michael H. Ranzenhofer
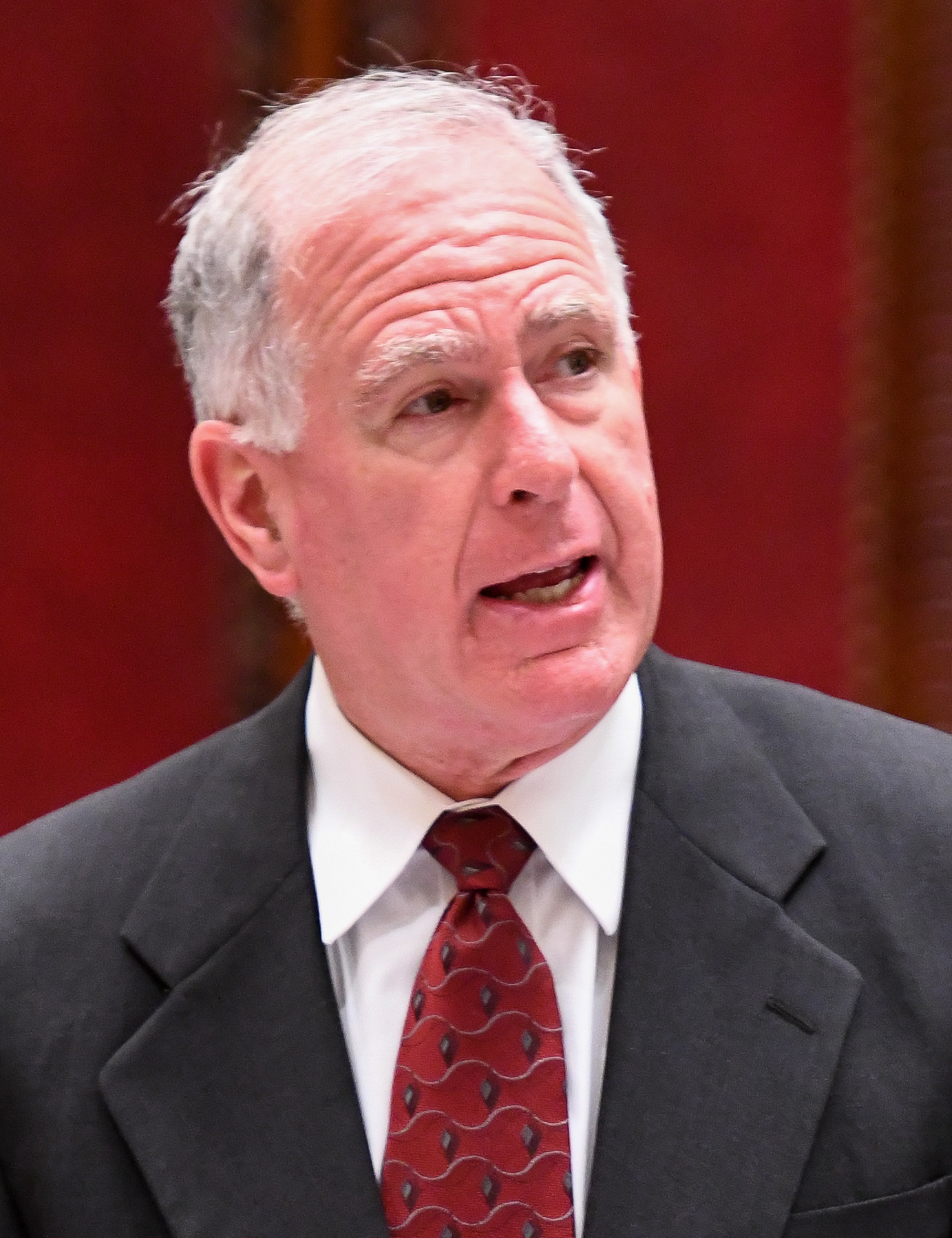

Member of the New York State Senate from the 61st district
- In office January 1, 2009 – December 31, 2020
- Preceded by: Mary Lou Rath
- Succeeded by: Edward Rath III

Member of the Erie County Legislature
- In office 1989–2008
- Preceded by: Richard R. Anderson
- Succeeded by: Edward A. Rath III
- Constituency: 16th district 6th district

Personal details
- Born: August 15, 1954 (age 71) Queens, New York, U.S.
- Party: Republican
- Spouse: Sue
- Children: 2
- Education: University at Albany, SUNY (BA); University at Buffalo (JD)
- Website: Official website

Michael H. Ranzenhofer (born August 15, 1954) is an American politician from the state of New York. From 2009 until 2020, Ranzenhofer was a Republican member of the New York State Senate from the 61st district.

== Education ==
Ranzenhofer earned a Bachelor of Arts degree from the University at Albany, SUNY 1976 and a Juris Doctor from the SUNY at Buffalo School of Law in 1979.

== Career ==
He is a partner at the law firm of Friedman and Ranzenhofer.

Ranzenhofer served in the Erie County Legislature from 1989 through 2008. While a legislator, he has served as the Legislature's Majority Leader during the budget crisis with then County Executive Joel Giambra and Minority Leader. He served on the Community Enrichment Committee and the Human Services Committee. He reportedly considered a race for Justice of the New York State Supreme Court during his tenure in the County Legislature.

Ranzenhofer was first elected to the State Senate on November 4, 2008.

In 2011, Ranzenhofer voted against the Marriage Equality Act allowing same-sex marriage in New York.

In 2014, Ranzenhofer appeared on The Daily Show to talk about yogurt legislation in New York State, which the host called "absurd".

In December 2019, Ranzenhofer announced that he would not seek re-election the following fall. He was succeeded by fellow Republican Edward Rath III.

== Personal life ==
Ranzenhofer is a longtime resident of the town of Amherst, New York. He and his wife Sue have two children: Lisa and David.

== See also ==
- 2009 New York State Senate leadership crisis

Political offices
Preceded by Mary Lou Rath	New York State Senate, 61st District; 2009–2020	Succeeded by Edward Rath III
