= Martha Stark =

American politician

Martha Stark is an American politician, formerly the Finance Commissioner of New York City. A tax attorney, she served as Finance Commissioner in the Cabinet of Mayor Michael Bloomberg from 2002 until 2009. She previously worked for the Manhattan Borough President, served as a White House Fellow at the United States Department of State and for the Finance Department before becoming commissioner. On April 28, 2009, Stark tendered her resignation due to an investigation into her conduct.

In January 2007, she applied to the New York State Legislature for election to the vacant office of New York State Comptroller, following the resignation of former Comptroller Alan Hevesi. She testified before the Legislature and the search committee and was selected as one of three finalists by the search committee consisting of former State Comptroller Edward Regan, former State Comptroller Carl McCall and former New York City Comptroller Harrison J. Goldin. State Assembly Speaker Sheldon Silver, upset that a member of the Assembly was not on the finalist list, announced that the new comptroller would not come off the list of finalists and would be an assemblymember.
