= Edward Regan =

American politician

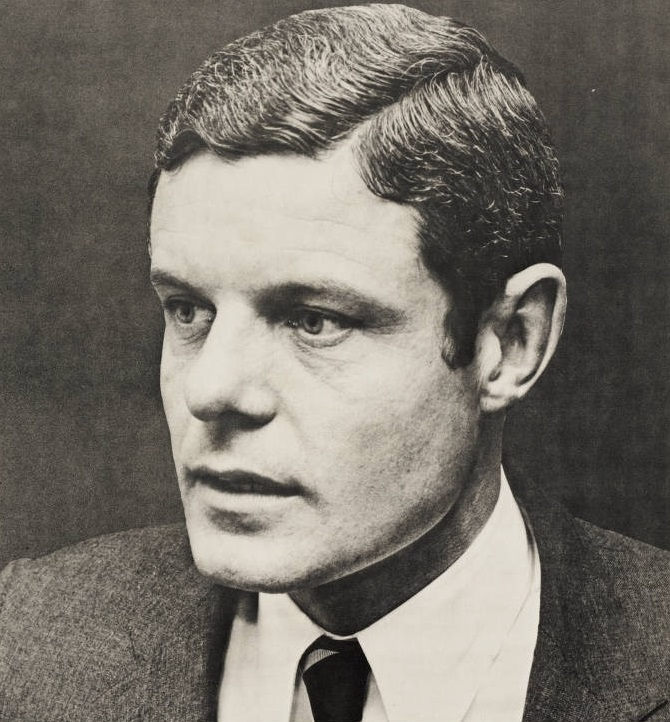

1st Chairman of the Erie County Fiscal Stability Authority
- In office 2005–2006
- Preceded by: Position established
- Succeeded by: Anthony Baynes Sr.

8th President of Baruch College
- In office 2000–2004
- Preceded by: Sidney I. Lirtzman
- Succeeded by: Kathleen Waldron

51st Comptroller of New York
- In office January 1, 1979 – May 7, 1993
- Governor: Hugh Carey; Mario Cuomo
- Preceded by: Arthur Levitt Sr.
- Succeeded by: Carl McCall

3rd Executive of Erie County
- In office 1972–1978
- Preceded by: B. John Tutuska
- Succeeded by: Ed Rutkowski

Personal details
- Born: Edward Van Buren Regan; May 14, 1930 Plainfield, New Jersey, U.S.
- Died: October 18, 2014 (aged 84) Greenwich, Connecticut, U.S.
- Party: Republican
- Education: Hobart College; University at Buffalo Law School
- Profession: Businessman; Public official

Edward Van Buren Regan (May 14, 1930 – October 18, 2014) (nicknamed Ned) was an American politician and public figure from New York State. He was a member of the Republican Party.

Regan's political career began on the Buffalo Common Council. He rose to prominence as the third Erie County Executive during the 1970s. Regan then became New York State Comptroller, and served in that role for nearly 15 years. He appeared on the Republican ticket in five statewide elections, more than any politician in the history of New York. From 2000 to 2004, Regan was president of Baruch College of the City University of New York, where he also served as a professor.

== Early life and education ==
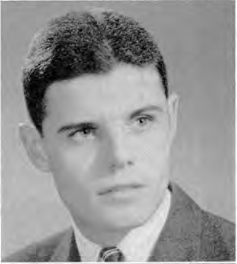
Reagan as a student at Hobart College, 1952.

Born in Plainfield, New Jersey to William and Allison (née Van Buren) Regan, Edward Van Buren Regan was raised in Utica, New York. He attended Nichols School, a prep school in Buffalo, New York, graduating in 1947.

He graduated an economics major in the Hobart Class of 1952 at Hobart and William Smith Colleges, where he was a member of Kappa Alpha Society. He served in the United States Navy as an intelligence officer from 1952 to 1953, then returned to Buffalo to help run his family's liquor business. He graduated cum laude from University at Buffalo Law School in 1964.

== Political career ==
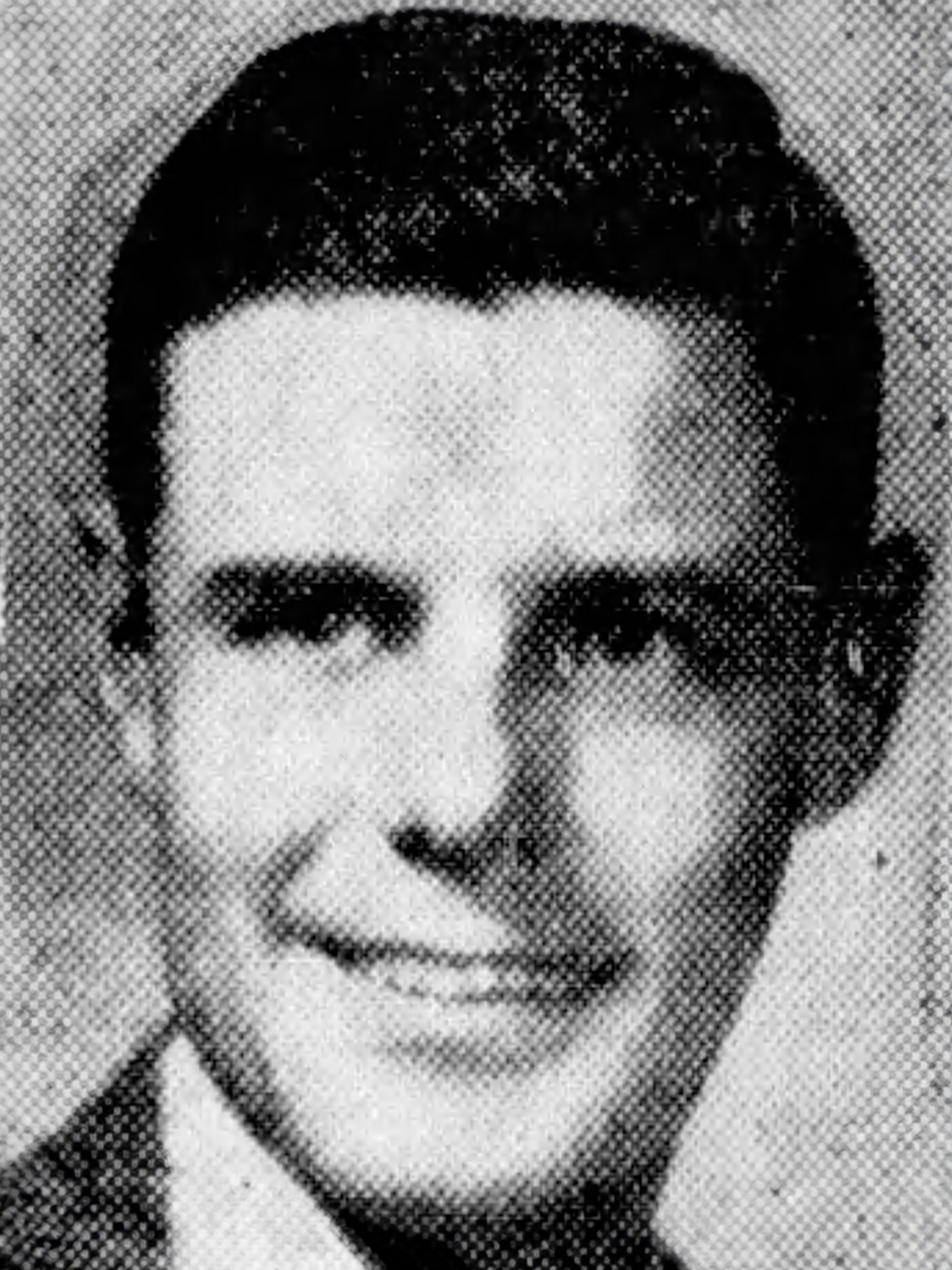
Regan in 1965.

Prior to becoming Comptroller, Regan served as County Executive of Erie County. He also served as a councilman in Buffalo. In 1970, he was defeated by the incumbent Comptroller Arthur Levitt Sr., but was elected New York State Comptroller in 1978, and re-elected in 1982, 1986 and 1990. He remained in office until May 7, 1993 when he resigned. He was succeeded by Carl McCall who was elected by the New York State Legislature to fill the unexpired term. In 1988, Regan was investigated by law enforcement officials after the disclosure of a memo written by members of his staff, one of which pointedly said of campaign contributors that "Those who give will get." He denied any impropriety.

Regan was briefly a candidate for the Republican nomination for Governor of New York in 1982, but withdrew from the race. Regan was Chairman of the Municipal Assistance Corporation for New York City in the 1990s. The corporation was set up in the 1970s to assist with the financial recovery of New York City following the city's fiscal crisis and near bankruptcy.

In the early 1990s, Regan served as a member of the US Competitiveness Policy Council and ably led its efforts on Corporation Governance. After leaving the comptroller's office, Regan served as a board member of numerous business and nonprofit organizations. He was President of Baruch College in New York from 2000-04.

== Post-political career ==
After retiring from the Baruch presidency, Regan became a professor at the Graduate Center of the City University of New York. He served as a trustee of the Financial Accounting Foundation and was a consultant to the Chairman of the Financial Accounting Standards Board (FASB) on matters of the convergence of GAAP with international accounting standards. For several months in 2005 and 2006, he served as the first chairman of the Erie County Fiscal Stability Authority, which was set up by the state in order to oversee the county's finances and make recommendations to the county government on financial affairs. The authority, considered a "soft" control board, was created in response to the Erie County fiscal crisis of 2005.

In January 2007, he served on the search committee for a new State Comptroller, following the resignation of Comptroller Alan Hevesi. The other search committee members were former State Comptroller Carl McCall and former New York City Comptroller Harrison J. Goldin. The committee recommended New York City Finance Commissioner Martha Stark, Nassau County Comptroller Howard Weizman and businessman William Mulrow to the State Legislature for consideration, but the Legislature elected Thomas DiNapoli instead.

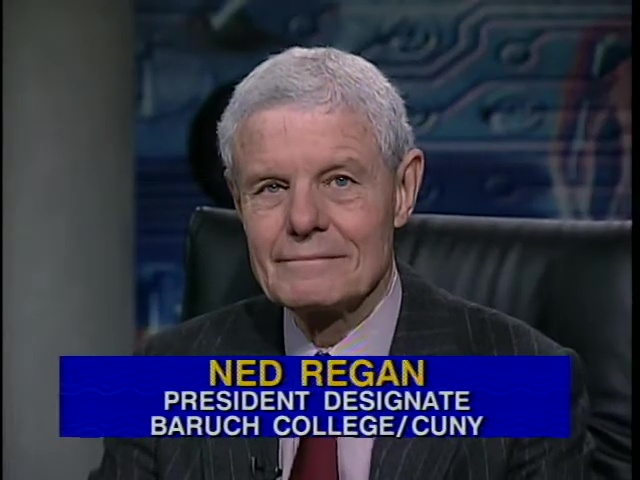
Regan on CUNY TV's Education Forum, 2000

Regan was a faculty member at the City University of New York (CUNY), holding the title of "Distinguished Professor" at Baruch College and the Graduate Center, and also teaching at the Macaulay Honors College on the civic and economic issues affecting New York City. He was a consultant to the chairman of the Financial Accounting Standards Board (FASB) working on a project with the International Accounting Standards Board (IASB) to create a global set of high-quality financial reporting standards. He was active in many civic organizations such as the Council on Foreign Relations, the Committee for Economic Development and the New York Economic Club.

== Death ==
On October 18, 2014, Regan died at a hospital in Greenwich, Connecticut at the age of 84. At the time of his death he had Alzheimer's disease and lived in a retirement home in Rye, New York.

== Political campaigns ==
=== 1970 NYS Republican ticket ===
- Governor: Nelson Rockefeller
- Lieutenant Governor: Malcolm Wilson
- Comptroller: Edward Regan
- Attorney General: Louis Lefkowitz
- U.S. Senate: Charles Goodell

=== 1978 NYS Republican ticket ===
- Governor: Perry B. Duryea Jr.
- Lieutenant Governor: Bruce Caputo
- Comptroller: Edward Regan
- Attorney General: Michael Roth

=== 1982 NYS Republican ticket ===
- Governor: Lewis Lehrman
- Lieutenant Governor: James L. Emery
- Comptroller: Edward Regan
- Attorney General: Frances Sclafani
- U.S. Senate: Florence Sullivan

=== 1986 NYS Republican ticket ===
- Governor: Andrew O'Rourke
- Lieutenant Governor: E. Michael Kavanagh
- Comptroller: Edward Regan
- Attorney General: Peter T. King
- U.S. Senate: Alfonse D'Amato

=== 1990 NYS Republican ticket ===
- Governor: Pierre Rinfret
- Lieutenant Governor: George Yancey
- Comptroller: Edward Regan
- Attorney General: Bernard C. Smith

== Sources ==
- "Regan, Under Fire, Comptroller Tends to Job, Not Image". The New York Times. March 9, 1989.
- His resignation from Baruch, in The Ticker on February 2, 2004
- Sack, Kevin (February 19, 1993). "Comptroller Resigns Albany Post To Head Institute at Bard College". The New York Times.

== See also ==
- Edward Regan Obituary

Party political offices
Preceded by Charles T. Lanigan	Republican nominee for New York State Comptroller; 1970	Succeeded by Stephen May
Preceded by Stephen May	Republican nominee for New York State Comptroller; 1978, 1982, 1986, 1990	Succeeded by Herbert London
Political offices
Preceded by B. John Tutuska	Erie County Executive; 1972–1978	Succeeded by Ed Rutkowski
Preceded by Arthur Levitt Sr.	New York State Comptroller; 1979–1993	Succeeded by Carl McCall
Preceded by New Position	Chairman of the Erie County Fiscal Stability Authority; 2005–2006	Succeeded by Anthony Baynes Sr.
Academic offices
Preceded by Sidney I. Lirtzman	President of Baruch College; 2000–2004	Succeeded by Kathleen Waldron
