= Lancaster High School (New York) =

Location
- 1 Forton Drive; Lancaster, New York 14086; United States; 42.929955°N 78.670993°W

Information
- School type: Public, high school
- Motto: Dedicated to excellence.
- Established: 1894
- Status: Open
- School district: Lancaster Central School District
- NCES District ID: 3616680
- CEEB code: 332765
- NCES School ID: 361668001488
- Principal: Michael Candella
- Faculty: 137.93 (on an FTE basis)
- Grades: 9-12
- Gender: Co-ed
- Enrollment: 1,682 (2024-2025)
- Student to teacher ratio: 12.19
- Campus: Suburban
- Colors: Red and black
- Mascot: Legends
- Yearbook: The Cayugan
- Website: Lancaster High School

Lancaster High School is a high school in Lancaster, New York, United States that serves grades 9-12. It is operated by the Lancaster Central School District.

== History ==
Lancaster High School was established in 1894.

=== Former principals ===
Previous assignment and reason for departure denoted in parentheses

- Burt B. Farnsworth: 1894–1904
- William J. Burr: 1904–1907
- Levi L. Higley: 1907–1910
- D.J. Zellman: 1910–1919
- Nora A. Kinnicutt: 1919–1930
- John J. White: 1930–1939
- Frank Cosgrove: 1939–1941
- Milton W. Brown: 1941–1945
- H. William Kling: 1948–1964 (principal of Lancaster Junior High School, retired)
- Larry A. Prince: 1964–1965 (principal of Silver Creek High School, resigned)
- Leo Koeser: 1965
- Oscar Roaldi: 1965–1990 (mathematics teacher at Lancaster High School, retired)
- Daniel Paveljack: 1990–2011 (principal of Warsaw Central School, retired)
- Cesar Marchioli: 2011–2021

== Academics ==
Lancaster High School offers a wide variety of courses. Many are structured in a fashion that prepares students for the New York State Regents Examinations that are required by the state for graduation. For students interested in a certain area of study, half- and full-year elective courses are offered in specific areas of study, such as Shakespeare and oceanography.

=== English Department ===
The English department of Lancaster High School offers many courses beyond the state-required yearly courses. Courses on historical fiction, mythology, creative writing, journalism, drama, and Shakespeare are offered to expand students' views on literature and writing.

== Music ==
Lancaster's music department includes eight in-school performance groups, in addition to extra-curricular performing groups. In 2018, the Lancaster Central School District Music Department was named one of the best communities in America for Music Education by the NAMM Foundation.

=== Band program ===
Lancaster High School has three bands that rehearse during school hours. The Concert Band is the entry-level band, the Wind Symphony is the mid-level band, and the Symphonic Band is the most prestigious. In 2010, all three attained a score of Gold or Gold with Distinction at their yearly NYSSMA evaluation. Lancaster also has a jazz ensemble and a successful marching band. In 2011 and 2013, the Lancaster High School Marching Redskins won the New York State Field Band Conference State Championship, Large School 2 division. The Lancaster Marching Redskins were officially promoted to the "National Class" of the New York State Field Band Conference on February 20, 2014.

=== Choral program ===
Lancaster has two in-school choral groups. the entry level choir for all incoming Fresman is the Mixed Choir and Concert Choir is the most prestigious. In 2011, Women's Choir and Mixed Choir attained a score of Gold at their NYSSMA evaluations, while Concert Choir attained Gold with Distinction. Out of school hours, the choral department has a show choir and a vocal jazz group. The Lancaster Men's Choir consists of the combined tenor and bass sections of both Mixed Choir and Concert Choir. The Lancaster Men's Choir attained a score of Gold at its 2011 NYSSMA evaluation.

=== Musicals ===
The Performing Arts Society presents a musical each year. In 2022, Lancaster's production of Catch Me If You Can won the Kenny Award for Outstanding Musical Production. In 1999, Lancaster's production of Fiddler on the Roof won the Kenny Award for Best Musical.

=== Marching band ===
The Lancaster Central School District has two marching bands, one at the middle school level and one at the high school level. The Lancaster Middle Schools participates in many spring events such as the Holland Tulip Festival and parade pageants in Springville and Batavia, New York. The Lancaster High School Marching band has its prime season during the summer and fall months, when the students perform in the New York State Field Band Conference. The Lancaster High School Marching Band has been an active member of the New York State Field Band Conference since 1998, winning two state championships during that time. Those championships include the 2011 performance of Alfred Hitchcock's The Birds and the 2013 performance of A Soldier's Creed. In February 2014, the marching band was promoted to the top tier class of the Field Band Conference, the National Class. The Lancaster Marching Band has performed all over the country, including the AutoZone Liberty Bowl in Memphis, Tennessee; Walt Disney World Main Street USA parades in Orlando, Florida; the Gator Bowl in Jacksonville, Florida; Jacksonville Jaguars and Buffalo Bills halftime shows; Band of America (BOA) performances in Indianapolis, Indiana; and at the Pearl Harbor Memorial Parade in Waikiki, Hawaii. The Lancaster High School Marching Band entered its 25th season in the New York State Field Band Conference in fall 2023, with a show titled "Believe Again".

== Academies ==
Lancaster High School contains eight academies, small learning communities that focus on a certain subject. Students apply for five of the academies halfway through their freshman year, while the sixth (Project Lead the Way) has entry requirements based entirely on academic performance in eighth grade. Students in an academy are required to take certain academy-based courses. Failing an academy course will result in expulsion from the academy.

=== Finance ===
The Academy of Finance focuses on accounting, banking, insurance, finance, and stock markets. Finance students are required to take a paid summer internship in the finance field between their junior and senior years. The Academy of Finance operates a satellite branch of Bank of Akron that is located at Lancaster High School. Finance students have the opportunity to earn college credit from Erie Community College. The Academy of Finance is a member of the National Academy Foundation. The Academy of Finance received the Aldo Papone award for excellence from NAF in 2010. Based on a leading internship program, the Academy of Finance received a $5000 award to continue promoting student excellence.

=== Project Lead the Way ===
Lancaster High School is a member of the national Project Lead the Way pre-engineering program. This program allows students to take engineering courses that can allow them to earn college credit from the Rochester Institute of Technology. As of 2010, Lancaster offered six Project Lead the Way Courses. These courses include Introduction to Engineering Design, Computer Integrated Manufacturing, Digital Electronics, Principles of Engineering, Biotechnical Engineering, and Engineering Design and Development. Project Lead the Way is recommended by the United States Department of Education as an exemplary program, and is partnered with companies such as Autodesk, National Instruments, and Fischertechnik and sponsored by companies such as 3M, Intel, and Lockheed Martin. Project Lead the Way is a partner of the National Academy Foundation.

== Athletics ==
Lancaster High School has teams in many sports, including baseball, American football, soccer, tennis, swimming, and basketball. The school's football team made it to the Section 6 Class AA championships in 2009, losing to 2009's eventual state champion, North Tonawanda High School. Len Jankiewicz ('69) was the Varsity football coach for 25 years, until the 2010 season. Coach "Jank" won the section VI championships in 1988 and 1999. In 2016 Eric Rupp became the head coach. Since then Lancaster has won the section VI championship title in 2016, 2017, 2018 and 2019. The school's rival is the Depew High School Wildcats, and the two varsity football teams meet every year for a non-league game as a part of the Great American Rivalry Series, presented by the US Army.

=== Redskins mascot ===
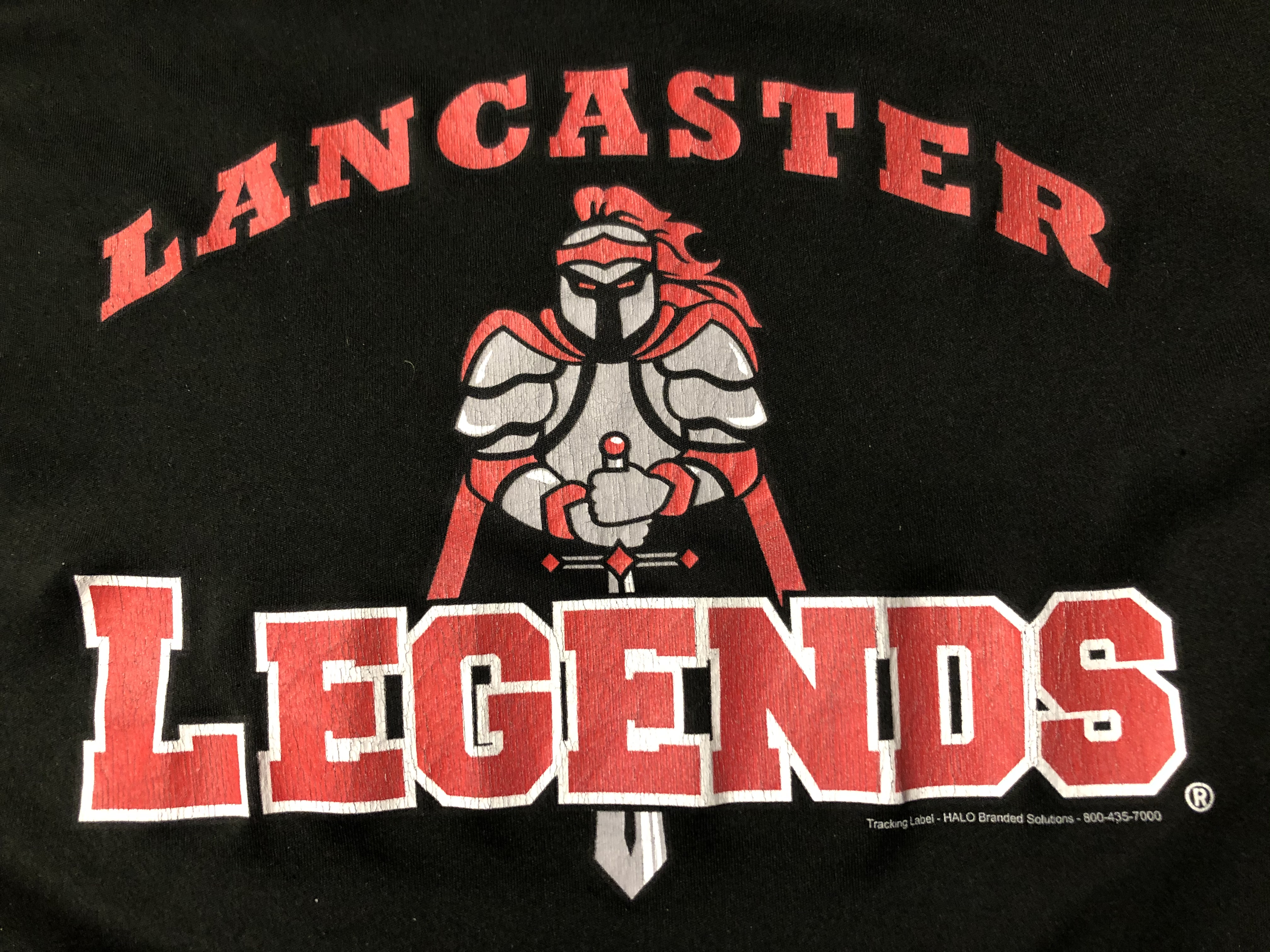
Logo of the Lancaster Legends

For more than 60 years, the Redskin name had been a part of the Lancaster Central School District. But on March 16, 2015, the Lancaster School Board voted to discontinue the use of the nickname "Redskins".

Beginning in 2001, the U.S. Commission of Civil Rights advocated for non-Native American schools to avoid using images and references that could have a negative prejudice or bias against Native American people. With this, the Lancaster School District started to slowly phase out the Redskin name by doing things such as ordering uniform's without any reference to the mascot name. The school district than announced it would make a decision in the 2017–2018 school year, but this came with opposition as some people wanted this timeline to be accelerated. During the school's spring lacrosse season, the Akron, Niagara Wheatfield and Lake Shore school districts boycotted Lancaster lacrosse games due to a large amount of Native American athletes on each of their respective teams. Due to these actions, the Lancaster School Board decided to immediately make a decision regarding the district's mascot name. In reaction to this decision to change Redskin name, there were some protests, including one by students of the Lancaster School District. About 10% of the student body of the Lancaster School District participated in a walkout in response of the name change on March 19, 2015. These protests weren't successful as the district was dedicated to its decision. Although previously scheduled for May 27, on June 2 and 3 of 2015 the students of the Lancaster High School, Lancaster Middle School, and William Street School voted for the new mascot name. The students were given seven choices to vote on: the Lancaster Alphas, the Lancaster Dragons, the Lancaster Jaguars, the Lancaster Knights, the Lancaster Legends, the Lancaster Pride, and the Lancaster Red Hawks.

After receiving 1,106 votes out of 3,072 total votes, it was announced on June 3 that the winning mascot name was the Lancaster Legends. The Legends logo was designed by an 8th grader named Korissa Gozdziak. To conclude this process, the Lancaster School Board finalized the new mascot name on June 8, 2015.

== Alumni ==
- Joe Andreessen – NFL player
- Pat Dobson – baseball player
- Christopher A. Kojm – deputy director of the 9/11 Commission; professor of international relations at George Washington University
- Jim McCloskey – baseball player
- Jack Philips – baseball player
- Mary Saxer – pole vaulter
- Ryan Vinz – ice hockey goalie
- Angela Wozniak – New York State legislator
