= 1986 New York State Comptroller election =

- November 4, 1986
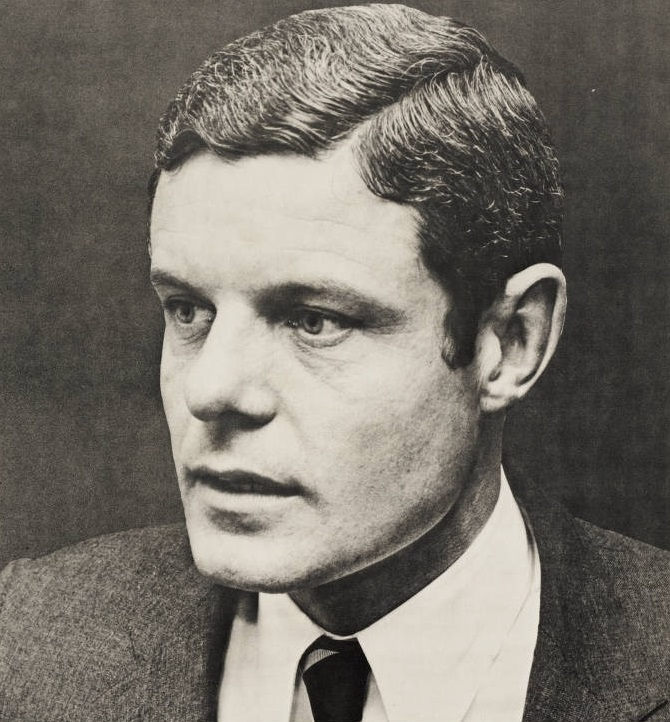

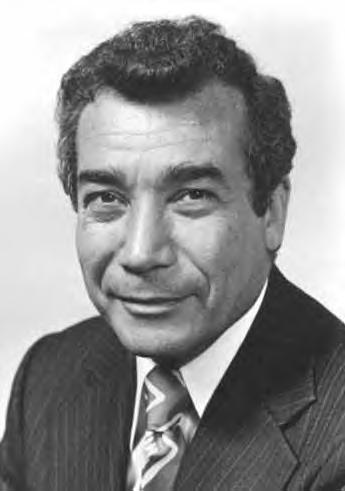
Nominee	Edward Regan	Herman Badillo
Party	Republican	Democratic
Alliance	Conservative	Liberal
Popular vote	2,274,548	1,593,174
Percentage	57.20%	40.07%
- County results Regan: 50–60% 60–70% 70–80% 80–90% Badillo: 50–60% 60–70%
New York Comptroller before election
Edward Regan
Republican
Elected New York Comptroller
Edward Regan
Republican

The 1986 New York State Comptroller election took place on November 4, 1986, to elect a candidate to the position of Comptroller. Republican nominee and incumbent Comptroller Edward Regan defeated Democratic nominee Herman Badillo, resulting in his election to the third of four consecutive terms he held as comptroller.

Regan was the only Republican candidate to win a statewide election for a position in the New York State Government in 1986, as Democratic candidates won both the gubernatorial and Attorney General elections. However, the Republicans won the concurrent U.S. Senate election.

== Republican convention ==
Edward Regan was the only Republican incumbent out of four statewide elected officials; He won the Republican nomination by acclamation in May along with all other Republican candidates on the statewide ballot.

The Republican ticket had a decided tilt in favor of Westchester County, with four out of five Republican candidates being from the county. This drew criticism from Republican Rockland County Clerk Joseph R. Holland, among others. Erie County Republican leader Victor Farley described a shift in power between sociological classes by stating "The party of Rockefeller, Teddy Roosevelt, the patroons and the millionaires is now the party of D'Amato, O'Rourke, [Anthony J.] Colavita and even Farley,".

As part of this gradual shift in power from the White Anglo-Saxon Protestants living north and west of New York City to the urban-dwelling Italian and Irish Catholics, the Republican Party began to bank on the suburbs more heavily than in previous years. The shift in power was partially fueled by the assumption that upstate voters would vote Republican no matter what; It was also fueled by easier access to money downstate. Upstate counties, which provided the Republican Party with 60% of their vote, were not at all represented in their statewide ticket. Though Regan was once a notable rural Republican himself, he moved to Katonah, Westchester County, three years prior to the convention. His upstate affiliations and Rockefeller Republican stances led to him being described as the "last link" to the bygone Rockefeller era by The New York Times.

== Democratic Convention ==
Similarly to Regan, Herman Badillo also won his party's nomination by acclamation, preventing the need for any primary. The nomination was won in June. John S. Dyson's candidacy for the Democratic nomination to U.S. Senate was a significant factor in this, as it cleared the way for an unopposed Badillo nomination to the position of Comptroller. Had Dyson instead decided to continue his run for Comptroller, it is likely a primary would have ensued.

Dyson sought and attained the support of Governor Cuomo and other party leaders, however his opponent Mark Green obtained 34.7% of the vote share in the convention, causing the nomination for senate to go to a September 9 primary ballot that he then lost. This was part of an ideological battle in the New York Democratic Party at the time between liberals and moderates that also incorporated identity politics; The reason for Cuomo's encouragement for Dyson to run for the U.S. Senate nomination was in part due to the desire to have a Black or Hispanic candidate such as Badillo be the Comptroller nominee.

Identity politics were such a significant factor in the convention that it spurred a protest among a dozen members of the state committee who were black, though not all of the black leaders were present. For example, Manhattan Borough President David Dinkins was notably absent, in what appeared to party members to be competitiveness among their leaders of color. The protest centered on the fact that there was no black person on the Democratic Party's ticket. Democratic Party leaders such as Mario Cuomo publicly stated that they could not find a suitable candidate of color for Lieutenant Governor or Comptroller, however privately Cuomo aides voiced their worry that a black person on the ticket for Lieutenant Governor would incite racial biases among the voter base, and thereby hurt Cuomo's chances at re-election. Had Cuomo decided to run for president, his Lieutenant Governor would have succeeded him for the position of Governor, making this protest significant for both the Comptroller election and the gubernatorial election.

In an attempt to appease the African-American community that would be crucial to his election chances, Badillo chose H. Carl McCall, who had represented Harlem in the state senate, as one of the chairs of his campaign on June 22, 1986. McCall was at the time an executive for Citibank, and his unsuccessful attempt to woo Democrats to nominate him as candidate for Lieutenant Governor in 1982 prompted Badillo to say that McCall was the most-accomplished political operative at the state level in the African-American community. The rift with black elected officials that he was trying to resolve went back to 1985, when several high-ranking blacks prevented an alliance of groups opposed to New York City Mayor Ed Koch from selecting Badillo as the candidate . After the blockade in 1985, Badillo answered by endorsing and energetically campaigning for the opposition of the preferred candidate of the black leaders. That same preferred candidate later on endorsed Badillo, expressing that "the appointment of Carl McCall will ... make him the Comptroller". Other black leaders were less convinced, but still in support of the nomination.

It was later uncovered that Badillo had given Cuomo's campaign $20,000, however this was a non-issue in the election. Badillo stated that the campaign donations had no connection to the Governor supporting them as candidates.

== Minor party conventions ==
Mary Jane Tobin, the founder of the Right to Life Party and candidate for Governor in 1978, was unanimously endorsed to be the Right to Life Party's candidate for Comptroller on June 2, 1986.

== Debate ==
There were several debates held between the two candidates, including a televised debate on October 19, 1986, on WNBC's "New4orum" Sunday program, and a debate between the two major candidates on September 30, 1986, at The New York Times.

=== WNBC debate ===
Prior to the debate, Regan had a three-page letter delivered to Badillo's campaign headquarters, in which Regan demanded that Badillo address his potentially unethical dealings and the conflict of interest in his connection to the Horizons Hotel Corporation and its June acquisition of the Hotel Carib-Inn Tennis Club and Resort. Regan asserted that Badillo's corporate activity, occurring concurrently as he chaired the New York Mortgage Agency, raised "serious questions". Regan also presented a number of inquires into these alleged activities by Badillo.

During the WNBC debate, two of the major points brought up were the accusations that Badillo had a conflict of interest with a Puerto Rican resort corporation, and a charge that Regan had been slow to act against corruption. Both were denied by the accused party in each case.

=== New York Times debate ===
There is more lasting coverage on the New York Times' debate, where four major issues besides the summary were discussed: state audits, an audit of the convention center, divestment from South Africa, and a tax windfall.

During the first portion of the debate, centered around audits, Badillo once again made the claim that since Regan's audits were delivered years overdue, they were worthless. He then cited several examples of such, while also accusing longtime incumbent Regan of cozying up to state officials. Regan responded to such accusations by re-affirming that his 1,900 audits had "a savings of $160 million ... savings to taxpayers". He then went on to note the further beneficial effects of his audits, and refuted the claim by Badillo that he had been too slow to act. The portion of the debate on the Convention center focused on Regan's attempt to do a concurrent audit in a diversion from standard audit practice, which Badillo claimed cost the state $112 million. Regan admitted mistakes had been made with the Convention center, but that the attempt to diverge from the norm had been worthwhile. In this portion of the debate, several spending issues were brought to the table, including concerns over the increasingly expensive penal system prisons and medicaid, expense accounts, and more. Later on October 27, following criticism that Regan hadn't called attention to scandal at the city's Parking Violations Bureau, Regan predicted the release of an audit that would be "critical" of several state and local agencies.

On the topic of divesting from South Africa, the two candidates cemented themselves into somewhat similar but still differing positions on the topic; Badillo made it clear that he supported full divestment from South Africa on account of their human rights violations, while Regan stated that he firmly believed in the moral issue, opposed the President's veto of the Comprehensive Anti-Apartheid Act, and supported partial divestment. Regan wanted only some states and colleges to divest, and no private or union pension systems. He also preferred pressuring companies to withdraw via stock-holder resolutions rather than legislation. Badillo made it a point that doing business in South Africa was both "morally wrong ... and it's also financially wrong", while Regan in his argument focused on protecting and expanding the pension funds.

Both candidates took a nearly indistinguishable stance on the tax windfall, with both agreeing to use the $2 billion tax windfall for some sort of tax reform, provided that the tax reform be done after the reception of the tax windfall rather than simultaneously during the reception, and further provided that the windfall be returned to the taxpayers rather than trying to shift relief to the poor. The pair then summarized and closed the debate by re-emphasizing their strengths and reasons for running.

== General election ==
=== Candidates ===
- Edward Regan, incumbent Comptroller and former Erie County Executive (Republican, allied with the Conservative Party)
- Herman Badillo, former U.S. Representative (Democratic, allied with the Liberal Party)
- Mary Jane Tobin (Right to Life), candidate for Governor from the Right to Life party in 1978
- Mary Fridley (New Alliance)

=== Campaign ===
In the September before the election, both major candidates characterized themselves to The New York Times as being in an uphill battle for the position; Regan described himself as "swimming against a political tide" of democratic strength, and Badillo stated that he was in an "uphill race". There was therefore heavy campaigning on both sides, though Badillo was at a disadvantage due to political infighting and low turnout in his core voter base of Puerto Ricans.

==== Advertising ====
In a mishap by CBS, one of Edward Regan's commercials appeared by accident on network television halfway across the country in Upper Sandusky, Ohio. It was thirty seconds of prime time coverage, worth at least $100,000. Maureen R. Connelly, Regan's political consultant, comically stated "Our votes in Upper Sandusky went up substantially". This coverage had a very limited impact for Regan, as the election was being held in New York rather than Ohio.

Otherwise, there were significant advertising efforts from both sides, such as the Liberal Party's advertising campaign to promote turnout on the liberal line. In particular, the liberal party spent $14,000 on advertising on four radio stations with largely Hispanic audiences.

Regan's advertising emphasized that he was an "independent" rather than a Republican. The televised advertisements he began running in the middle of September repeated the theme, "Experience is the bottom line." Literature and commercials also emphasized Regan's over 1,900 audits of state agencies and local governments. He had a non-partisan perception, and relatively poor relations with his own party.

Badillo had an extreme financial handicap compared to Regan, and as of July 11 he had only spent $280; Mario Cuomo held a $1,000 a ticket fundraiser for Badillo to help narrow the gap. His campaign primarily focused on his credentials, such as the fact that he had been the first Puerto Rican Borough president. It was predicted that he could run for Mayor if he lost the Comptroller election, if he had a decent performance in the election.

==== Canvassing and rallies ====
On November 3, the last day of campaigning and the day before the election, the Republican Party candidates traveled over Republican leaning areas of New York State, generally emphasizing three major themes: lower taxes, anti corruption measures, and a criminal justice system overhaul. In several places where they feared low voter apathy, they also made a call for large turnout. The trip was funded by the huge war chests of Regan and D'Amato, who were both heavily favored. There was also worry about how the Cuomo administration would handle the tax windfall if re-elected.

On the Democratic side, popular Governor Mario Cuomo also pleaded for increased voter turnout among a crowd in lower Manhattan, asking for residents to defy predictions of low voter turnout. Then, near Second Avenue, he appeared alongside Democratic candidate Mark Green to speak out against President Reagan's reduction in entitlement funding.

=== Notable endorsements ===
==== Edward Regan ====
- The New York Times
- El Diario, in a shocking turn that was seen as bad news for Badillo's campaign
- Several public employee unions

==== Herman Badillo ====
- Public Employees Federation of professional workers

=== Fundraising ===
==== October 4 ====
As of October 4, Regan had spent nearly all of the total $1.2 million he had raised, and had $254,695 on hand. Badillo had raised about $102,000 in total, with $38,800 on hand after expenditures. Badillo said to the times "For the first time in my life, I'm solvent,"; this was due to him previously running many campaigns on low budgets.

==== October 27 ====
According to reports filed with the State Board of Elections ten days prior to the election, incumbent comptroller Edward Regan had raised almost $1.9 million in total funds, and had $122,000 on hand. Herman Badillo, his democratic opponent, had raised a total of just $267,000, and had slightly less cash on hand than Regan.

=== Results ===
The result of the 1986 New York State Comptroller election was Edward Regan handily winning a third term as comptroller with a 3–2 margin. The Republican Party held strong in the suburbs and Long Island, which they had banked on. The election featured record levels of ticket-splitting, to a magnitude that hadn't been seen before in the state's history. It also featured a low level of voter turnout, with 55.5% of registered voters turning up to the polls. This was the lowest voting turnout in a gubernatorial election in at least 50 years, and it defied logic at the time which suggested that split-ticket voting and low voter turnout didn't agree. The results were officially confirmed in December 1986.

A total of 505,314 blank, void, and scattering votes are not counted for in the election box below.

1986 New York State Comptroller election
Party	Candidate	Votes	%
Republican	Edward Regan	2,051,745	51.60%
Conservative	Edward Regan	222,803	5.60%
Total	Edward Regan (incumbent)	2,274,548	57.20%
Democratic	Herman Badillo	1,500,609	37.74%
Liberal	Herman Badillo	92,565	2.33%
Total	Herman Badillo	1,593,174	40.07%
Right to Life	Mary Jane Tobin	91,236	2.29%
New Alliance	Mary Fridley	17,447	0.44%
Total votes		4,976,399	100%

== See also ==
- New York State Comptroller elections
