= New York's 61st State Senate district =

American legislative district

Senator
| Jeremy Zellner; D–Tonawanda |
- Registration: 37.8% Democratic; 33.6% Republican; 21.0% No party preference
- Demographics: 78% White; 11% Black; 4% Hispanic; 5% Asian
- Population (2017): 293,439
- Registered voters: 200,693

New York's 61st State Senate district is one of 63 districts in the New York State Senate. The seat has been represented by Jeremy Zellner since 2026, following then-incumbent Sean Ryan's resignation on December 31, 2025 to serve as Mayor of Buffalo.

== Geography ==
District 61 encompasses Grand Island, Amherst, the Town of Tonawanda, the City of Tonawanda, and parts of Buffalo's Delaware, Ellicott, Masten, Niagara, North, and University wards.

The district is fully contained in New York's 26th congressional district, and contains parts or all of the 140th, 141st, 145th, 146th, and 149th districts of the New York State Assembly.

== Recent election results ==
=== 2026 general ===
2026 New York State Senate election, District 61
Primary election
| Party | Candidate | Votes | % |
|---|---|---|---|
| Democratic | Jonathan Rivera | 10,222 | 54.8 |
| Democratic | Jeremy Zellner (incumbent) | 8,412 | 45.1 |
| Write-in | | 29 | 0.1 |
| Total votes | | 18,663 | 100.0 |
General election
| Democratic | Jonathan Rivera | | |
| Working Families | Jonathan Rivera | | |
| Total | Jonathan Rivera | | |
| Republican | Christopher McMaster | | |
| Conservative | Christopher McMaster | | |
| Total | Christopher McMaster | | |
| Write-in | | | |
| Total votes | | | |

=== 2026 special ===
Incumbent Sean Ryan resigned his seat on December 31, 2025 to serve as Mayor of Buffalo, triggering a special election. In special elections for state legislative offices, primaries are not held - county committee members for each party select nominees.

2026 New York State Senate special election, District 61
| Party | Candidate | Votes | % |
|---|---|---|---|
| Democratic | Jeremy Zellner | 19,341 | 59.7 |
| Republican | Dan Gagliardo | 9,853 | |
| Conservative | Dan Gagliardo | 3,033 | |
| Total | Dan Gagliardo | 12,886 | 39.8 |
| Write-in | | 175 | 0.5 |
| Total votes | | 32,402 | 100.0 |
| Democratic hold | | | |

=== 2024 ===
2024 New York State Senate election, District 61
| Party | Candidate | Votes | % |
|---|---|---|---|
| Democratic | Sean Ryan | 80,274 | |
| Working Families | Sean Ryan | 8,146 | |
| Total | Sean Ryan (incumbent) | 88,420 | 61.7 |
| Republican | Christine Czarnik | 46,343 | |
| Conservative | Christine Czarnik | 8,323 | |
| Total | Christine Czarnik | 54,666 | 38.2 |
| Write-in | | 160 | 0.1 |
| Total votes | | 143,246 | 100.0 |
| Democratic hold | | | |

=== 2022 (redistricting) ===
2022 New York State Senate election, District 61
Primary election
| Party | Candidate | Votes | % |
|---|---|---|---|
| Democratic | Sean Ryan | 11,448 | 86.1 |
| Democratic | Benjamin Carlisle | 1,798 | 13.5 |
| Write-in | | 51 | 0.4 |
| Total votes | | 13,297 | 100.0 |
| Republican | Edward Rath III | 3,712 | 78.0 |
| Republican | Joel Giambra | 994 | 20.9 |
| Write-in | | 54 | 1.1 |
| Total votes | | 4,760 | 100.0 |
| Conservative | Edward Rath III | 203 | 83.9 |
| Conservative | Joel Giambra | 37 | 15.3 |
| Write-in | | 2 | 0.8 |
| Total votes | | 242 | 100.0 |
General election
| Democratic | Sean Ryan | 57,616 | |
| Working Families | Sean Ryan | 6,285 | |
| Total | Sean Ryan (incumbent) | 63,901 | 56.6 |
| Republican | Edward Rath III | 39,305 | |
| Conservative | Edward Rath III | 9,500 | |
| Total | Edward Rath III (incumbent) | 48,805 | 43.3 |
| Write-in | | 90 | 0.1 |
| Total votes | | 112,796 | 100.0 |
| Democratic win (new boundaries) | | | |

=== 2020 ===
2020 New York State Senate election, District 61
Primary election
| Party | Candidate | Votes | % |
|---|---|---|---|
| Democratic | Jacqualine Berger | 9,386 | 38.6 |
| Democratic | Kim Smith | 9,232 | 37.9 |
| Democratic | Joan Seamans | 5,577 | 22.9 |
| Write-in | | 133 | 0.6 |
| Total votes | | 24,328 | 100.0 |
| Independence | Edward Rath III | 1,003 | 70.2 |
| Independence | Andrew Gruszka | 397 | 27.8 |
| Write-in | | 28 | 2.0 |
| Total votes | | 1,428 | 100.0 |
General election
| Republican | Edward Rath III | 66,085 | |
| Conservative | Edward Rath III | 10,753 | |
| Independence | Edward Rath III | 2,492 | |
| SAM | Edward Rath III | 127 | |
| Total | Edward Rath III | 79,457 | 53.7 |
| Democratic | Jacqualine Berger | 68,230 | 46.2 |
| Write-in | | 131 | 0.1 |
| Total votes | | 147,818 | 100.0 |
| Republican hold | | | |

=== 2018 ===
2018 New York State Senate election, District 61
| Party | Candidate | Votes | % |
|---|---|---|---|
| Republican | Michael Ranzenhofer | 49,410 | |
| Conservative | Michael Ranzenhofer | 9,199 | |
| Independence | Michael Ranzenhofer | 1,746 | |
| Reform | Michael Ranzenhofer | 425 | |
| Total | Michael Ranzenhofer (incumbent) | 60,780 | 54.1 |
| Democratic | Joan Seamans | 48,279 | |
| Working Families | Joan Seamans | 2,010 | |
| Women's Equality | Joan Seamans | 1,182 | |
| Total | Joan Seamans | 51,471 | 45.8 |
| Write-in | | 20 | 0.1 |
| Total votes | | 112,271 | 100.0 |
| Republican hold | | | |

=== 2016 ===
2016 New York State Senate election, District 61
Primary election
| Party | Candidate | Votes | % |
|---|---|---|---|
| Working Families | Thomas Loughran | 46 | 80.0 |
| Working Families | Andre Liszka | 13 | 20.0 |
| Write-in | | 0 | 0.0 |
| Total votes | | 59 | 100.0 |
| Reform | Michael Ranzenhofer (incumbent) | 14 | 100.0 |
| Write-in | | 0 | 0.0 |
| Total votes | | 14 | 100.0 |
General election
| Republican | Michael Ranzenhofer | 60,480 | |
| Conservative | Michael Ranzenhofer | 10,964 | |
| Independence | Michael Ranzenhofer | 3,338 | |
| Reform | Michael Ranzenhofer | 473 | |
| Total | Michael Ranzenhofer (incumbent) | 75,255 | 57.6 |
| Democratic | Thomas Loughran | 49,316 | |
| Working Families | Thomas Loughran | 2,954 | |
| Women's Equality | Thomas Loughran | 1,093 | |
| Total | Thomas Loughran | 53,363 | 40.9 |
| Green | Ruben Cartagena Jr. | 2,012 | 1.5 |
| Write-in | | 29 | 0.0 |
| Total votes | | 130,630 | 100.0 |
| Republican hold | | | |

=== 2014 ===
2014 New York State Senate election, District 61
| Party | Candidate | Votes | % |
|---|---|---|---|
| Republican | Michael Ranzenhofer | 38,845 | |
| Conservative | Michael Ranzenhofer | 9,265 | |
| Independence | Michael Ranzenhofer | 2,974 | |
| Stop Common Core | Michael Ranzenhofer | 627 | |
| Total | Michael Ranzenhofer (incumbent) | 51,711 | 65.8 |
| Democratic | Elaine Altman | 23,632 | |
| Working Families | Elaine Altman | 3,204 | |
| Total | Elaine Altman | 26,836 | 34.2 |
| Write-in | | 26 | 0.0 |
| Total votes | | 78,573 | 100.0 |
| Republican hold | | | |

=== 2012 ===
2012 New York State Senate election, District 61
| Party | Candidate | Votes | % |
|---|---|---|---|
| Republican | Michael Ranzenhofer | 60,866 | |
| Conservative | Michael Ranzenhofer | 8,492 | |
| Independence | Michael Ranzenhofer | 3,745 | |
| Total | Michael Ranzenhofer (incumbent) | 73,103 | 59.0 |
| Democratic | Justin Rooney | 46,990 | |
| Working Families | Justin Rooney | 3,899 | |
| Total | Justin Rooney | 50,889 | 41.0 |
| Write-in | | 31 | 0.0 |
| Total votes | | 124,023 | 100.0 |
| Republican hold | | | |

=== Federal results in District 61 ===
| Year | Office | Results |
|---|---|---|
| 2020 | President | Biden 52.9 – 44.9% |
| 2016 | President | Trump 47.8 – 47.3% |
| 2012 | President | Obama 50.2 – 48.1% |
| 2012 | Senate | Gillibrand 60.5 – 38.0% |
