= Edward Rath III =

American politician

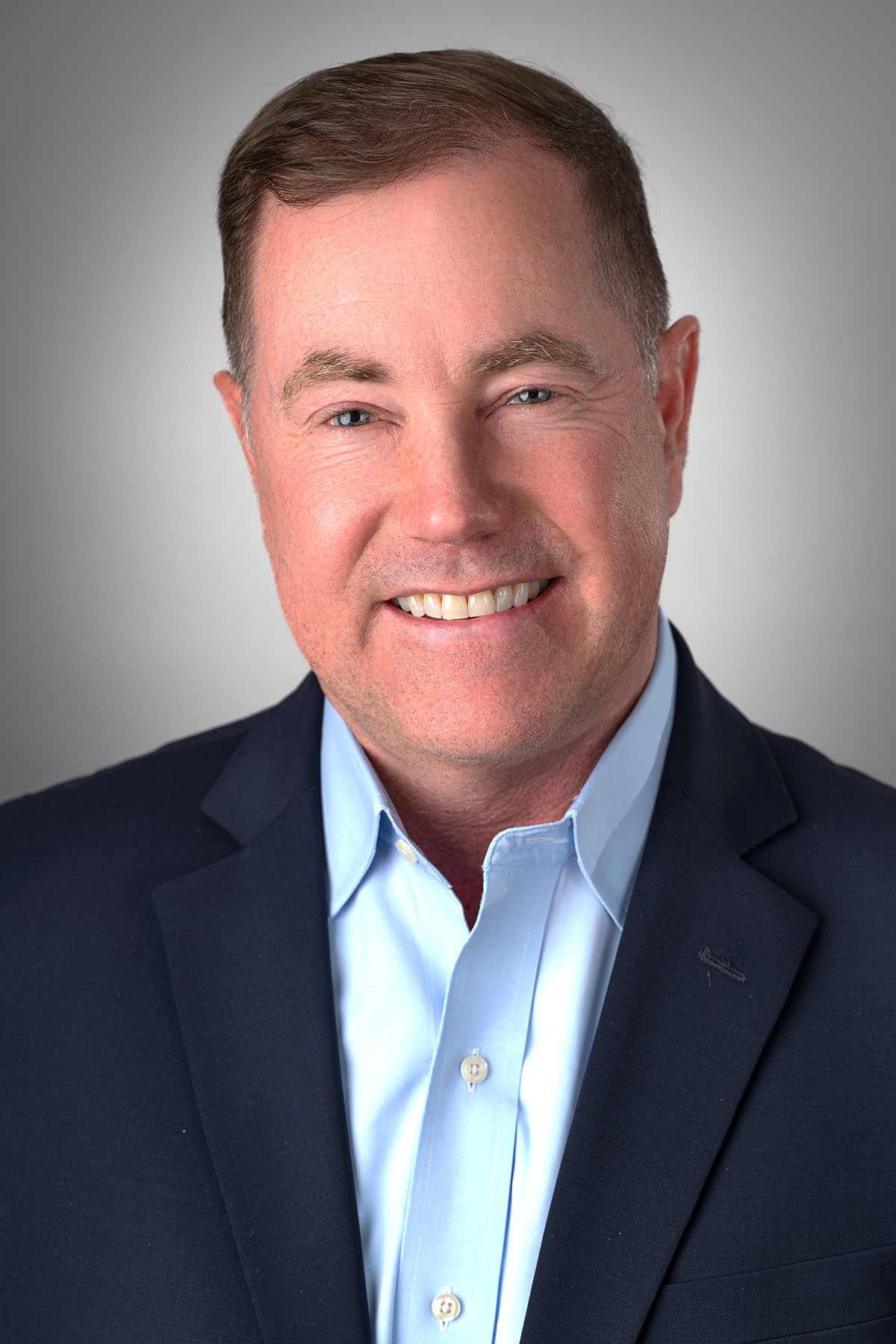

Member of the New York State Senate from the 61st district
- In office January 6, 2021 – December 31, 2022
- Preceded by: Michael Ranzenhofer
- Succeeded by: Sean Ryan

Member of the Erie County Legislature from the 6th district
- In office January 2008 – January 2021
- Preceded by: Michael Ranzenhofer
- Succeeded by: Christopher Greene

Personal details
- Born: Edward August Rath III Amherst, New York, U.S.
- Party: Republican
- Spouse: Amy E. Palleschi
- Relations: Mary Lou Rath (mother); Edward A. Rath (grandfather)
- Children: 3
- Education: Syracuse University (BA); Canisius College (MBA)

Edward August Rath III is an American politician who served as a member of the New York State Senate from the 61st district. Elected in November 2020, he assumed office on January 6, 2021.

== Early life and education ==
Rath was born in Amherst, New York. His mother, Mary Lou Rath, served as a member of the New York State Senate from 1993 to 2008. His grandfather, Edward A. Rath, was the first county executive of Erie County. Rath's father, Edward Rath Jr., was a justice of the New York Supreme Court. After graduating from the Nichols School, Rath earned a Bachelor of Arts degree in political science and history from Syracuse University and a Master of Business Administration from Canisius College.

== Career ==
From 2001 to 2003, Rath worked as a consultant for ProLiance Energy. He was later a consultant at the NOCO Energy Corporation and a sales manager for Gateway Energy. From 2012 to 2014, Rath was a manager at APG&E.

In 2008, he was elected to the Erie County Legislature, representing the sixth district. During his tenure in the legislature, he served as a member of the Public Safety Committee and drafted legislation to create a Property Tax Stabilization Fund. Rath was elected to the New York State Senate in November 2020 and assumed office on January 6, 2021.
