= B. John Tutuska =

American politician

2nd Executive of Erie County
- In office 1969–1971
- Preceded by: Edward C. Rath
- Succeeded by: Edward V. Regan

47th Erie County Sheriff
- In office 1959–1969
- Preceded by: Robert A. Glasser
- Succeeded by: Thomas W. Ryan

Personal details
- Born: December 4, 1911
- Died: July 30, 1993 (aged 81)
- Party: Republican

B. John Tutuska (December 4, 1911 – July 30, 1993) was the second county executive in Erie County, New York, serving from 1969 to 1971. The Depew, New York-born Tutuska succeeded Edward C. Rath in 1969 after Rath died in office. Prior to being appointed county executive, Tutuska served as Erie County Sheriff from 1959 to 1969.

== Biography ==
Tutuska defeated then Common Council member Stanley M. Makowski, future mayor of Buffalo, New York in a special election held on November 4, 1969, 55% - 45%. During that election, a major campaign issue was the claim by Makowski that Tutuska was responsible for the failed Buffalo Bills domed stadium project. Tutuska was the endorsed GOP candidate for reelection in 1971 when he suffered a heart attack. While he was recuperating from his heart attack he was challenged to a primary election by Ned Regan. Rather than run in the primary, he withdrew from the race and the GOP nomination went to Regan, who subsequently defeated Frank A. Sedita, mayor of Buffalo, in the general election.

Political offices
Preceded by Edward C. Rath	Erie County, New York County Executive; 1969 –1971	Succeeded by Edward V. Regan
