= Edward A. Rath =

American politician

1st Executive of Erie County
- In office 1961–1968
- Preceded by: Position established
- Succeeded by: B. John Tutuska

County Clerk of Erie County
- In office 1952–1960
- Preceded by: Steven Pankow
- Succeeded by: Robert W. Grimm, Sr.

Personal details
- Born: Edward August Rath; April 17, 1907 Buffalo, New York, U.S.
- Died: October 28, 1968 (aged 61) Buffalo, New York, U.S.
- Party: Republican
- Spouse: Mildred K. Rath (née Gates)
- Relations: Edward Rath III (grandson)

Edward August Rath (April 17, 1907 – October 28, 1968) was an American politician who served as the first county executive of Erie County, New York.

== Career ==
Following the transition from the board of supervisors form of government for Erie County to a County Executive form, Rath was elected in 1960 to an initial three-year term. The Edward A. Rath County Office Building, is named in his honor.

Rath was re-elected as County Executive in 1963 and 1967. He died in office in 1968 and was succeeded by Sheriff B. John Tutuska.

== Personal life ==
Rath was the patriarch of a prominent Western New York political family. His son, Edward A. Rath, Jr. (1930-2003), served as a justice of the New York State Supreme Court and his daughter-in-law, Mary Lou Rath was a member of the New York State Senate and a former minority leader of the Erie County Legislature. His grandson, Edward Rath III, is a member of the New York State Senate.

Political offices
Preceded by newly created	Erie County Executive; 1961 – 1969	Succeeded by B. John Tutuska
