= Lancaster Central School District =

School district in New York, United States

Location
- Erie County Lancaster, New York United States

District information
- Type: Public
- Motto: "Centers of Learning and Growth"
- Grades: K-12
- Superintendent: Andrew P. Kufel, Ph.D.
- Schools: 7

Students and staff
- District mascot: Legends
- Colors: Red and Black

Other information
- Website: Lancaster Central Schools

The Lancaster Central School District is a New York school district including the area surrounding Lancaster, New York. The district consists of 7 schools and for the 2015-2016 school year has a total enrollment of 5,278 students . The current Superintendent is Dr. Andrew P. Kufel. The school district had received national media attention due to controversy over the school's former mascot, the Lancaster Redskins.

== District ==
Lancaster's District Offices are located at 177 Central Avenue. The current superintendent is Dr. Andrew P. Kufel.

== District history ==
=== Former superintendents ===
Previous assignment and reason for departure noted in parentheses

- Joseph L. Girardi–1986-2003 (Assistant Superintendent - Oneida City School District, retired)
- Thomas J. Markle–2003-2007 (Superintendent - Springville-Griffith Institute Central School District, named Superintendent of Seaford Central School District)
- Edward Myszka–2007-2013 (Assistant Superintendent of Business and Support Services - Lancaster Central School District, retired)

== Schools ==
- Lancaster High School (Built in 1955) Cornerstone laid on June 27, 1957, and has 1955 inscribed on it. Opened on September 5, 1957 and dedicated on November 17, 1957
- Lancaster Middle School (Opened on September 4, 1923 as Lancaster Junior-Senior High School and dedicated on November 21, 1924)
- William Street School (Built in 1998) Dedicated on September 2, 1998 and opened on September 9, 1998
- Como Park Elementary School (Built in 1952) Opened on April 21, 1952 and dedicated on June 13, 1952
- Court Street Elementary School (Built in 1955) Cornerstone laid on October 8, 1955. Opened on September 5, 1956. Dedicated on February 10, 1957.
- Hillview Elementary School (Built in 1946) Cornerstone laid on May 5, 1946 and opened on September 3, 1946
- John A. Sciole Elementary School - Opened on September 8, 1965 and dedicated on November 8, 1965

== Former Schools ==
- Bowmansville Elementary School - Opened on September 6, 1949 and closed in June 1983
- Central Avenue Elementary School (grades K-3), Opened on September 2, 1952 and dedicated on November 10, 1952. Closed in June 2010
- Westinghouse Elementary School
