= Southtowns =

Term for southern suburbs of Buffalo, NY

Coordinates: 42°42′N 78°44′W

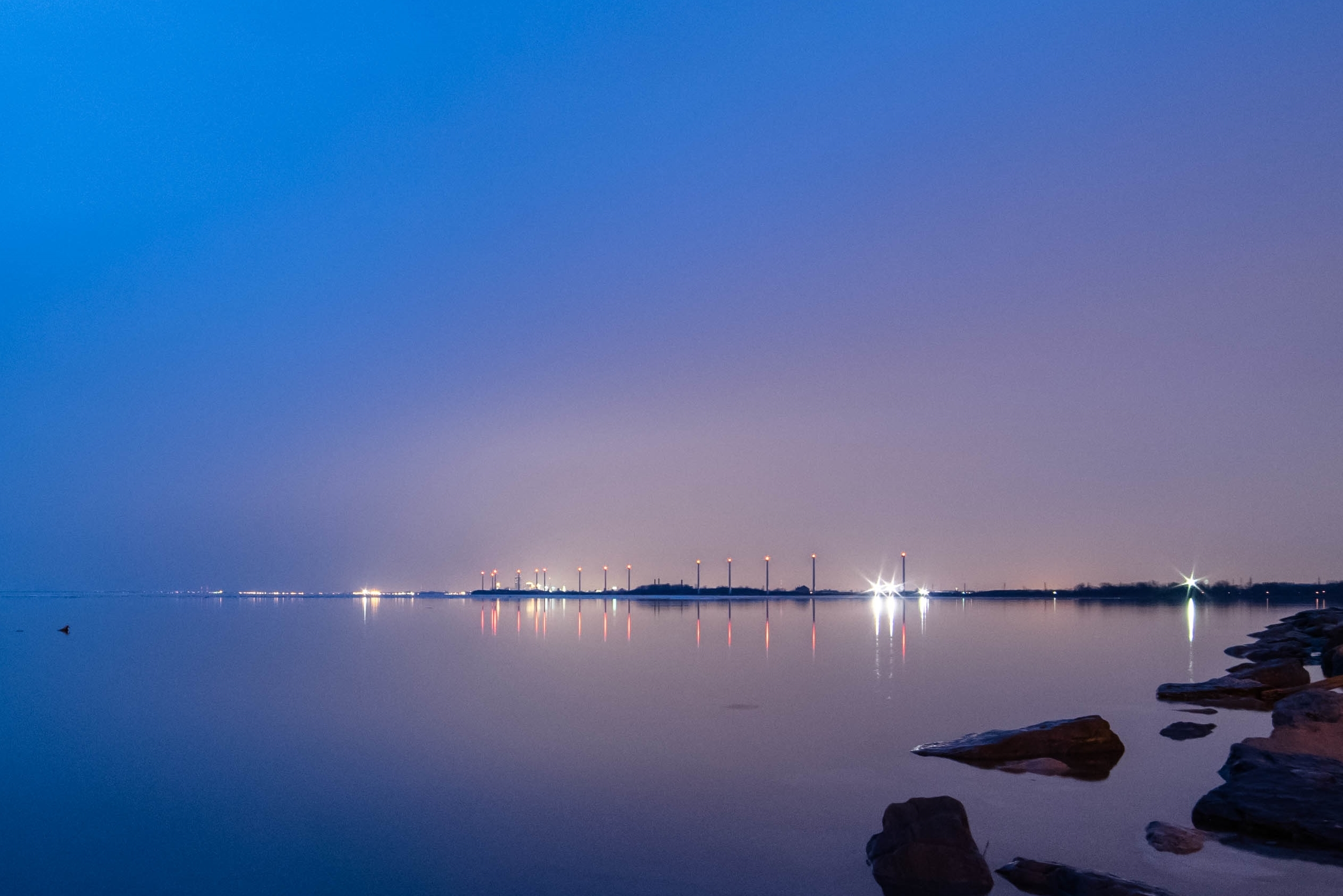
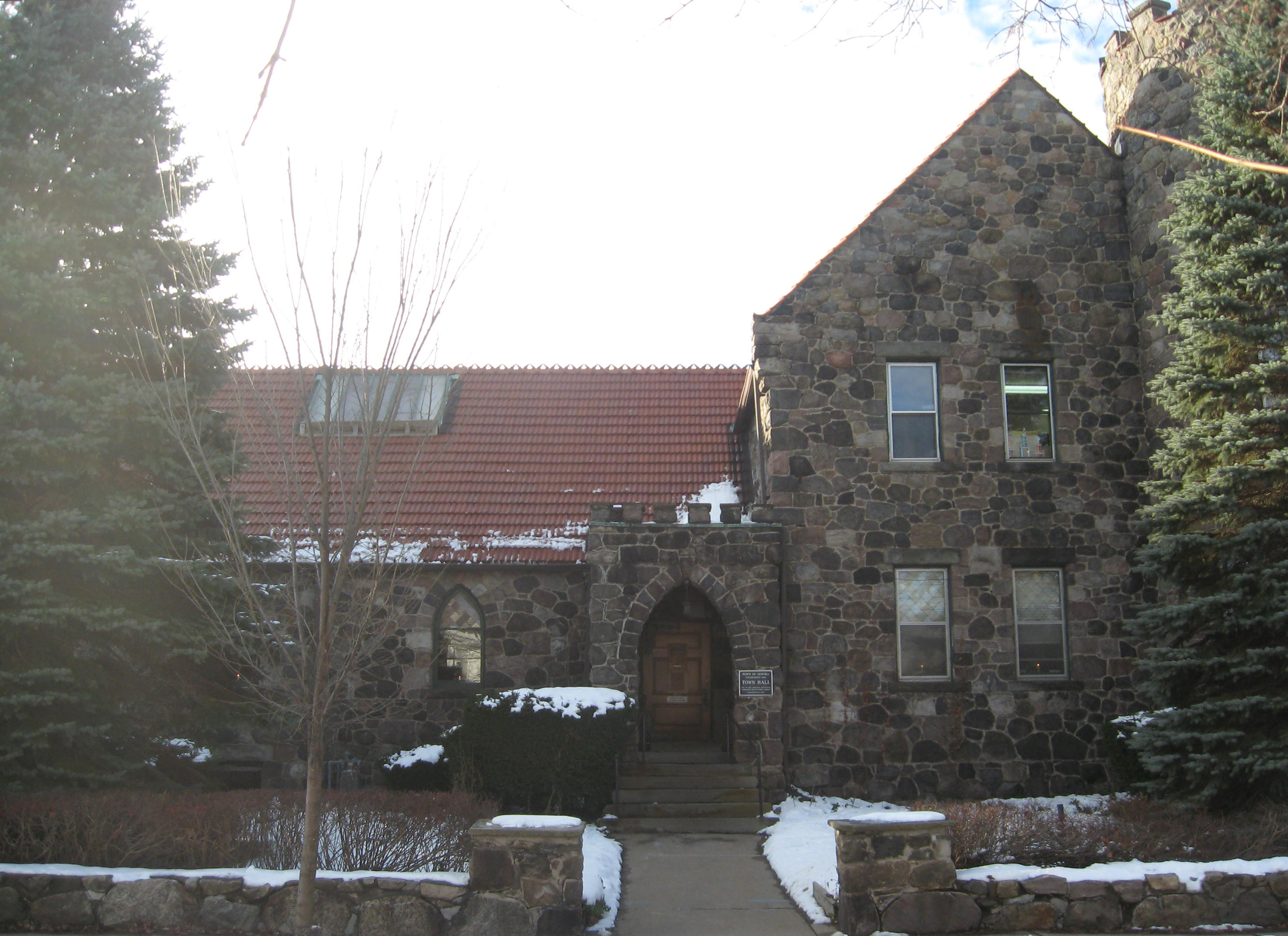
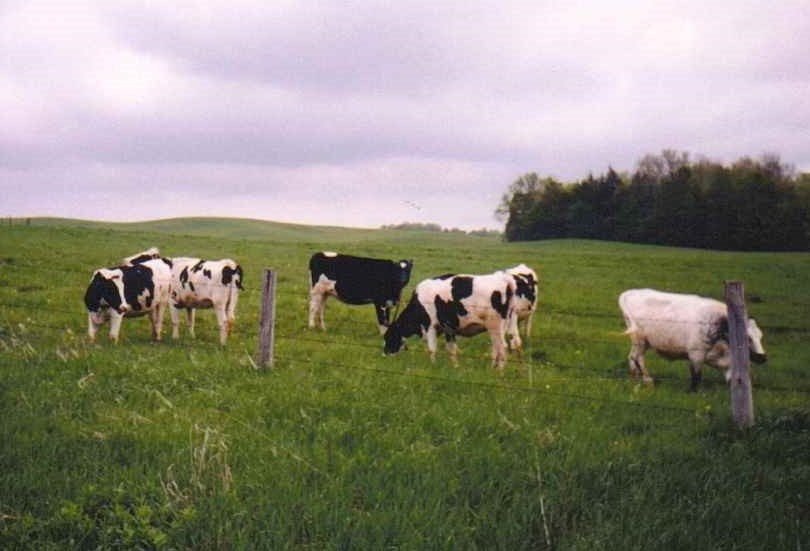
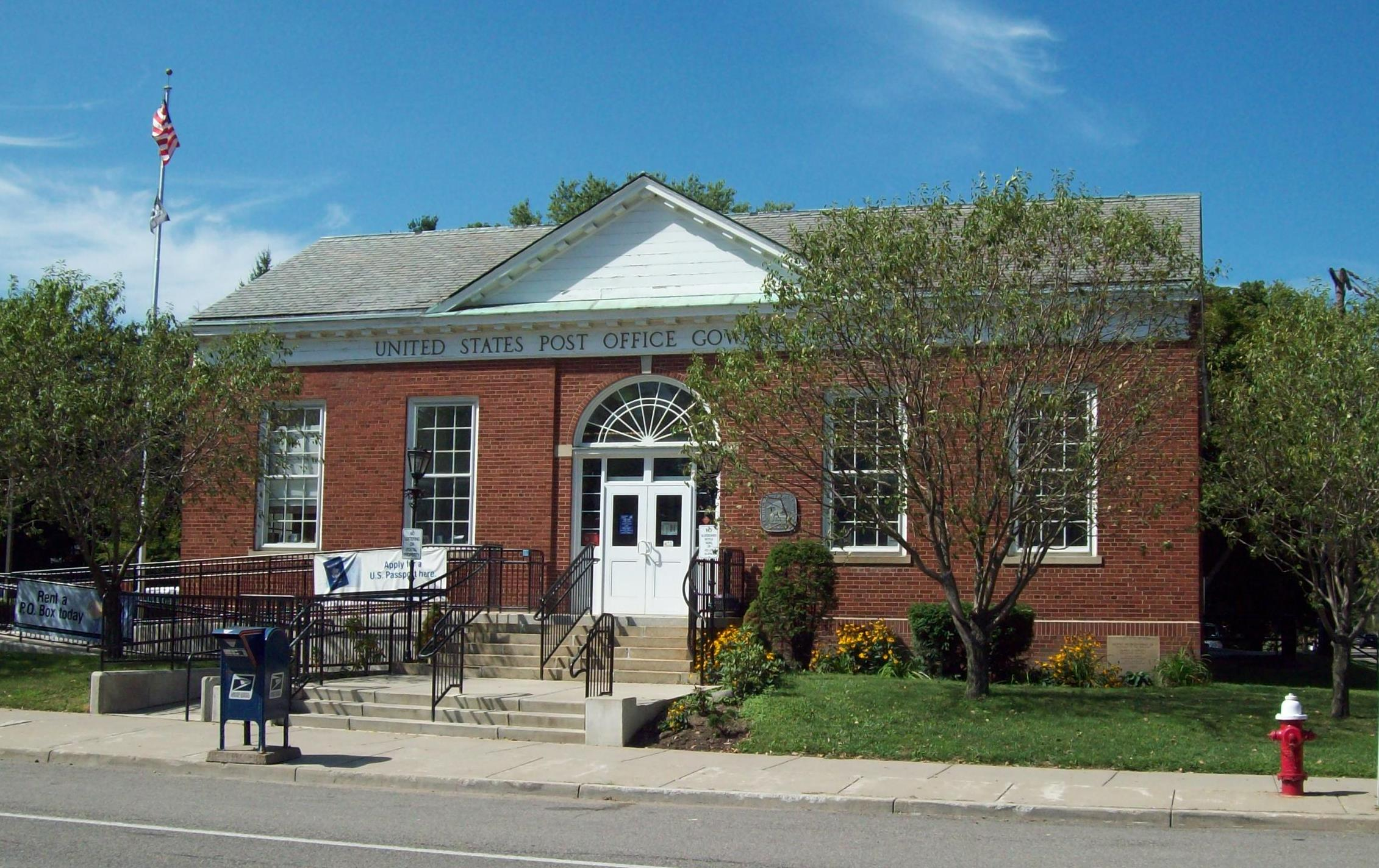
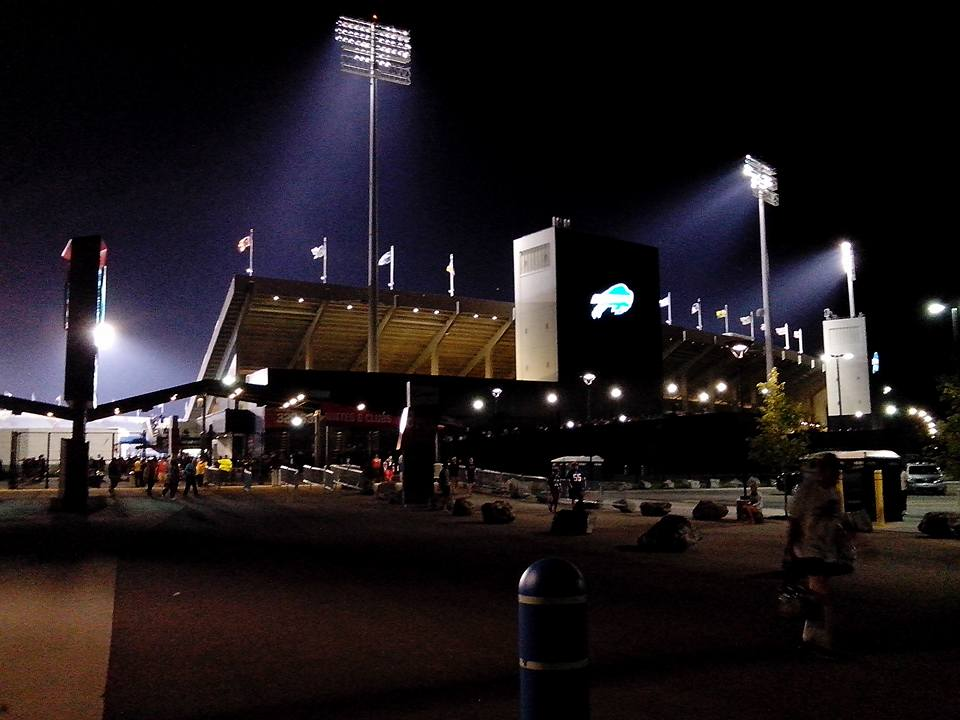
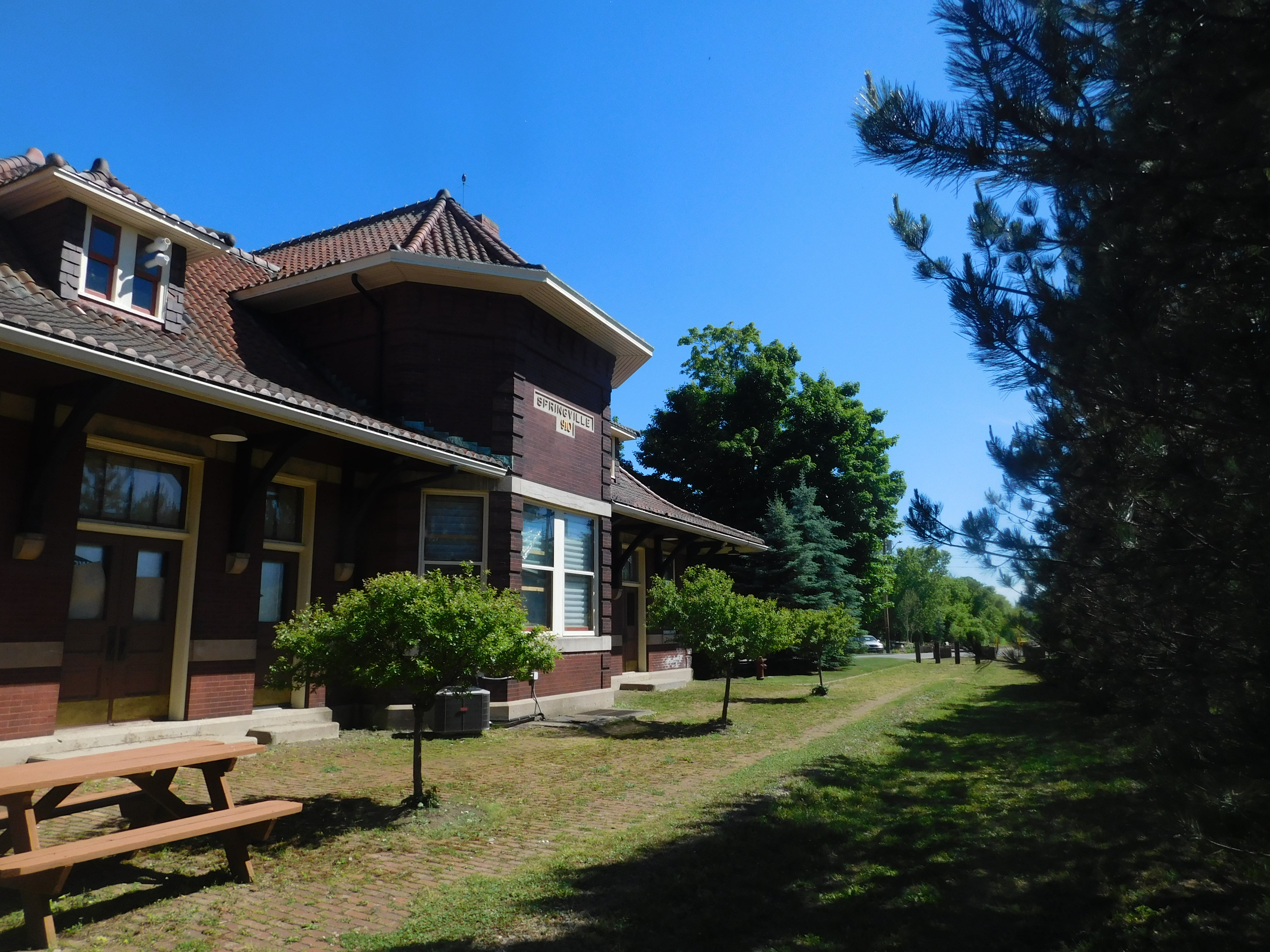
- Southtowns; Left to right from top: View of Lake Erie from Hamburg, Aurora Town Hall, Dairy Cows in Collins Center, U.S. Post Office in Gowanda, Highmark Stadium, Springville station

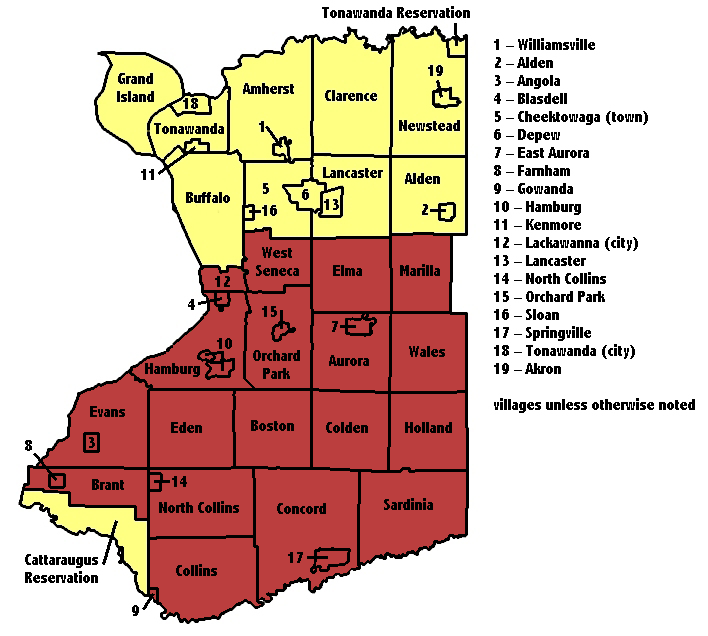
- Location of the Southtowns in Erie County. Northtowns & Reservations Southtowns
- Country: United States
- State: New York
- County: Erie County
- Largest Village: Hamburg

The Southtowns (also known as the Buffalo Southtowns, the South Towns, or Southtown) is a region of Western New York, United States, that lies within the snowbelt or ski country. It includes the southern suburbs of Buffalo, New York. This is the common name for the southern part of Erie County, New York.

Its most notable resident was United States President Millard Fillmore, whose former home is a National Historic Landmark. The region has numerous historic landmarks, especially in Springville and East Aurora.

== Details ==
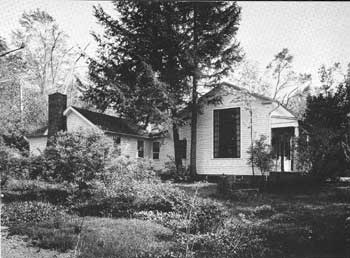

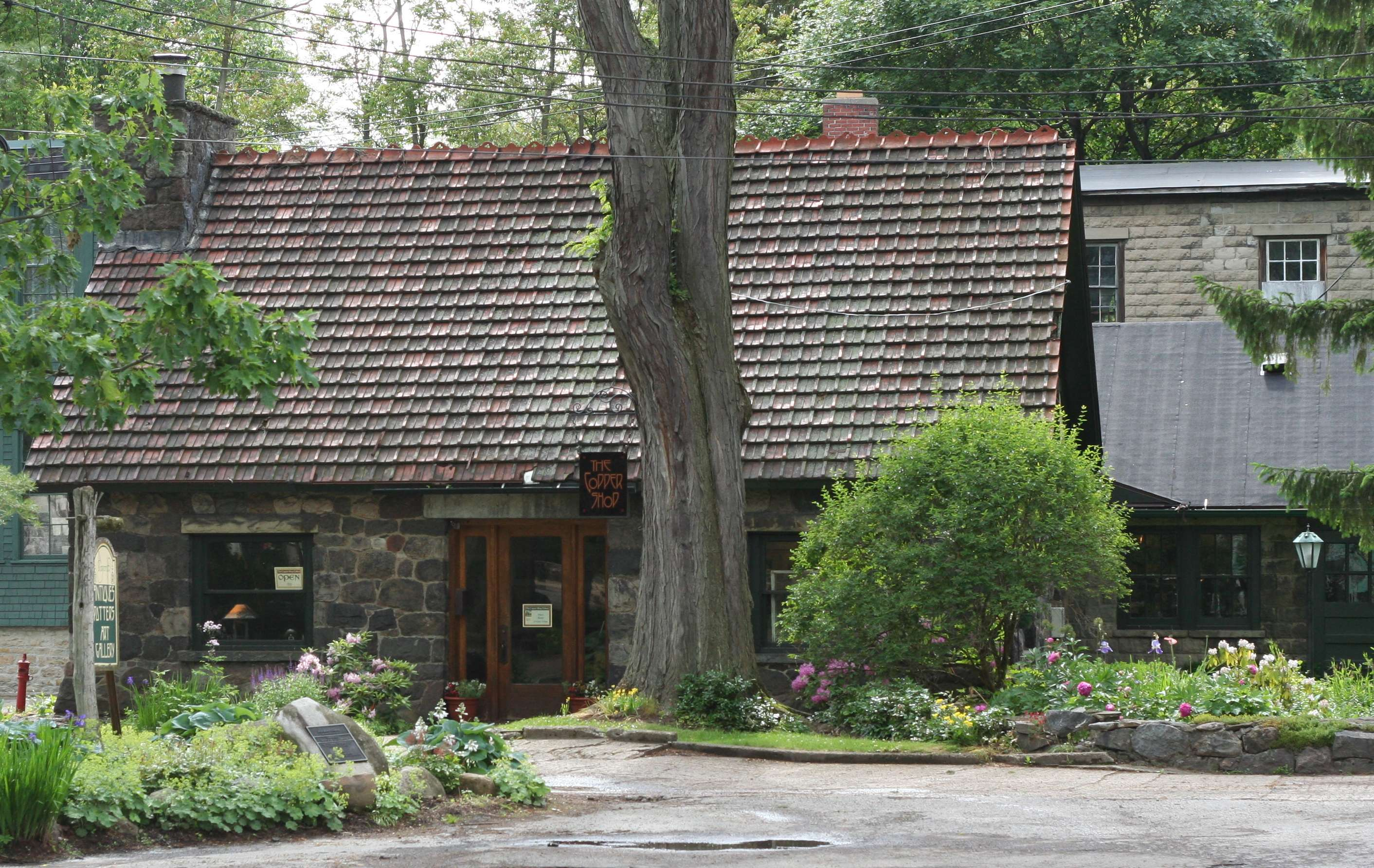
The Fillmore House (top) and Roycroft are both National Historic Landmarks.

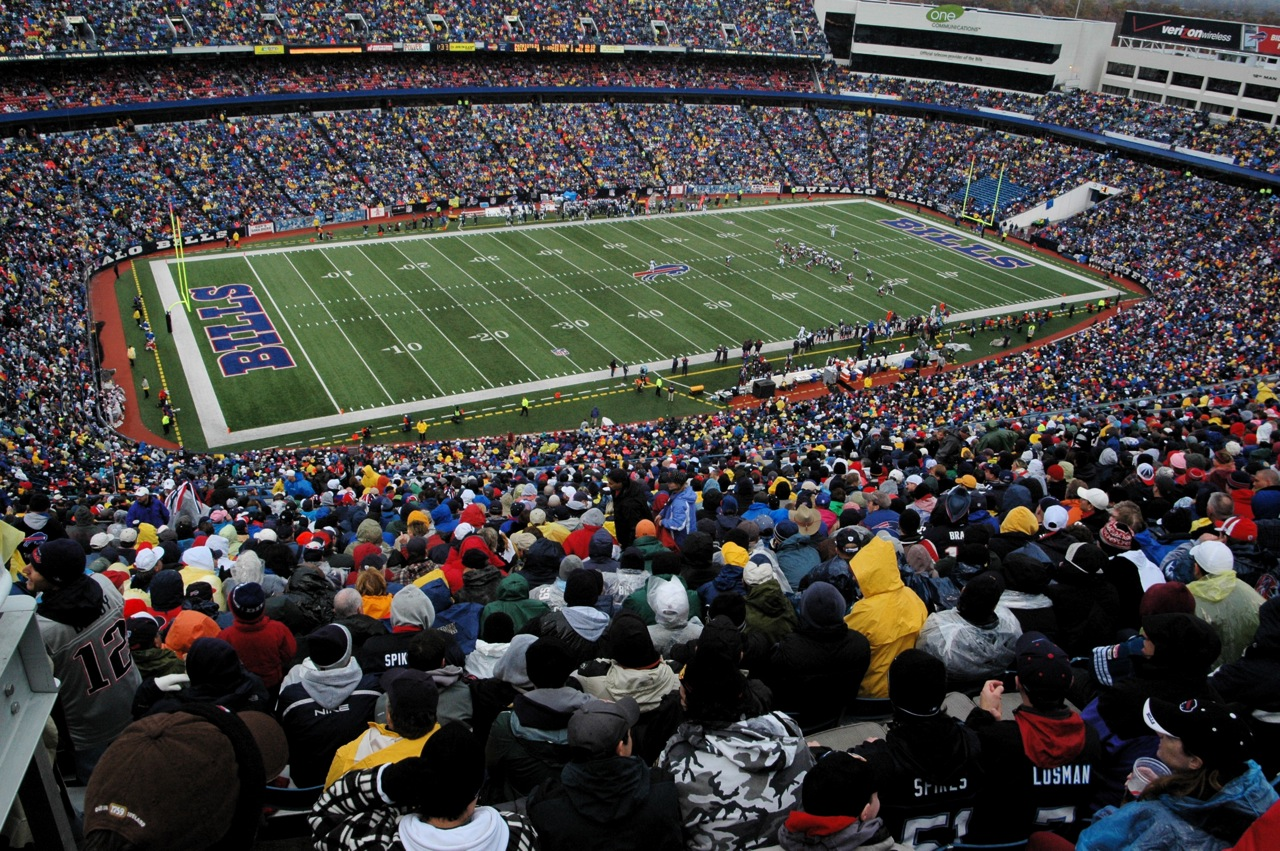
Ralph Wilson Stadium, the home field of the Buffalo Bills from 1973 to 2025.

According to a telephone directory that formerly published specific editions for the area, this region includes Aurora, Blasdell, East Aurora, Elma, Hamburg, and Orchard Park. Several other towns in the snowbelt south of Buffalo are also considered part of the Southtowns. According to one source the entire southern part of Erie County, West Seneca, Elma, Marilla, and southward are part of the Buffalo Southtowns. This region is the northwesternmost foothills of the Appalachian Mountains. The New York State Department of Transportation's Scenic Byways Advisory Board created Western New York's first Scenic Byway, WNY Southtowns Scenic Byway, which travels through the townships of Orchard Park, Boston, Concord, Colden and Aurora, the three villages of Orchard Park, Springville and East Aurora and several rural hamlets including the hamlets of Boston and Colden. (In 2016, the Southtowns Scenic Byway was extended into Ashford, a town in Cattaraugus County and not generally counted in the Southtowns proper.) The National Weather Service defines the Southtowns (forecast zone NYZ085, "Southern Erie County") as anything south of U.S. Route 20A. The region includes the northeastern half of the village of Gowanda, but not the southwestern half.

The Buffalo metro area also includes a "Northtown" region north of the city. Some sources divide the entire Buffalo suburban region into the Southtowns and the Northtowns.

Ski country runs through the Southtowns, as does the Niagara Frontier, both of which continue southwestward from the region along Lake Erie's shoreline; the Niagara Frontier continues north into Buffalo toward Niagara Falls while ski country goes eastward toward Bristol Mountain. The region is bounded to the south by the Cattaraugus Creek and Cattaraugus County to the south, Chautauqua County to the southwest, to the east by Wyoming County, and to the west by Lake Erie.

The Southtowns, particularly the more southerly towns closer to the Cattaraugus Creek, are very rural in nature and are similar to the Southern Tier; the northern Southtowns (beginning at approximately Orchard Park and Hamburg) begin to take on a more suburban feel.

=== Attractions ===
East Aurora, the home of Fisher-Price, has earned the nickname as "Toy Town, U.S.A." According to the New York State Department of Economic Development's New York State Tourism organization publications produced by the Buffalo Niagara Convention & Visitors Bureau, attractions in the Southtowns include, Toy Town Museum, Elbert Hubbard-Roycroft Museum, National Historic Landmark Millard Fillmore House, the Frank Lloyd Wright and the Graycliff Estate. Frommer's also mentions the Kazoo Museum, Eden as an attraction.

The National Register of Historic Places includes the following Southtowns venues among its Erie County listings: United States Post Office-Angola, First Church of Evans Complex, Graycliff, Millard Fillmore House, Roycroft Campus, George and Gladys Scheidemantel House, Kleis Site, Gamel Hexadecagon Barn, Buffalo, Rochester and Pittsburgh Railway Station (Orchard, New York), Johnson-Jolls Complex, Old Sardinia Town Hall, Rider-Hopkins Farm and Olmsted Camp, The Baptist Church of Springville, Buffalo, Rochester and Pittsburgh Railroad Station (Springville, New York), Citizens National Bank, East Main-Mechanic Streets Historic District, Scobey Power Plant and Dam, US Post Office-Springville, and Eaton Site.

Other highly attended attractions in the region include Highmark Stadium, the home of the National Football League's Buffalo Bills, Chestnut Ridge Park, and Buffalo Raceway. Since 1868, Erie County Fair has been held annually in Hamburg. Until the 1980s one of the region's largest employers was Bethlehem Steel.

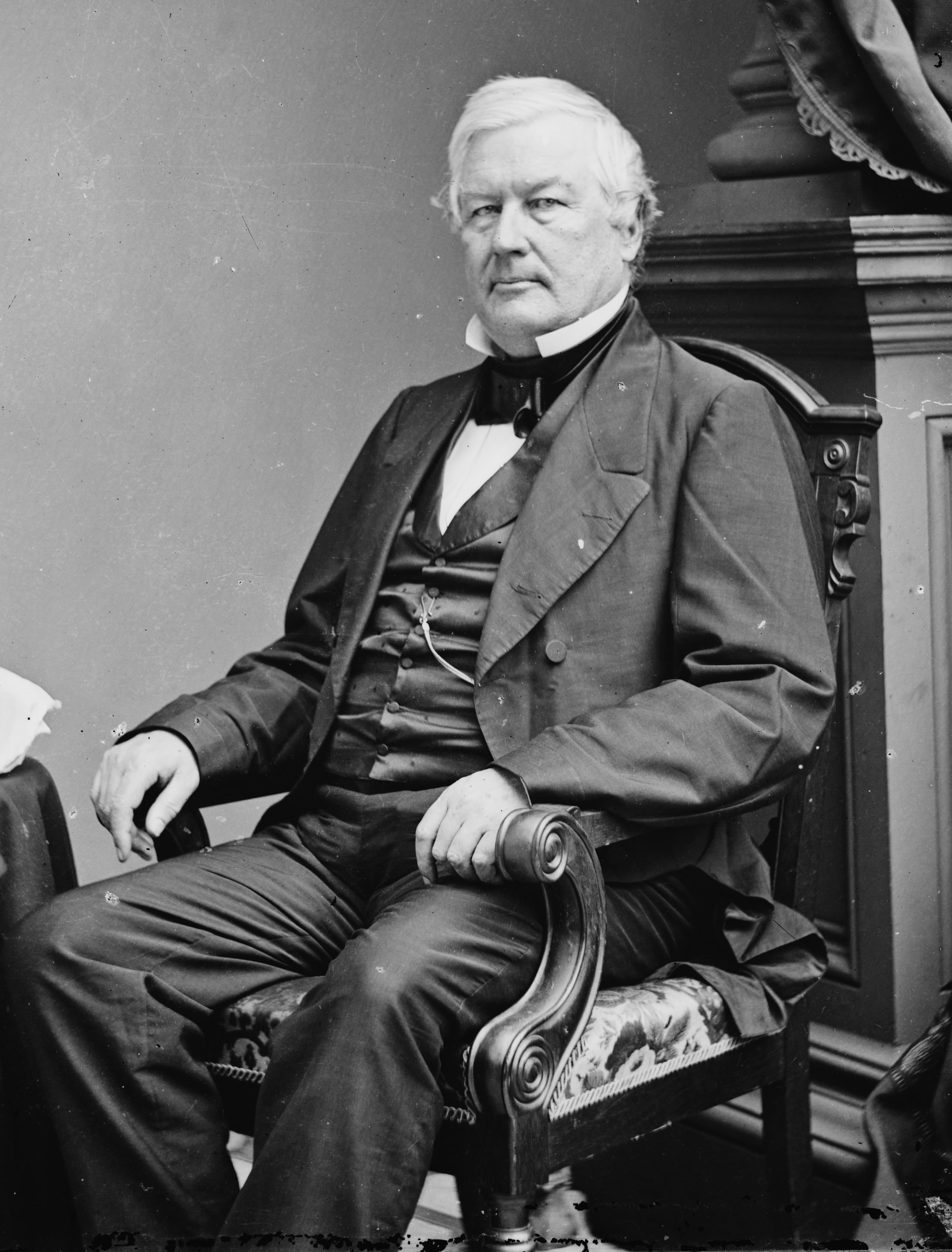
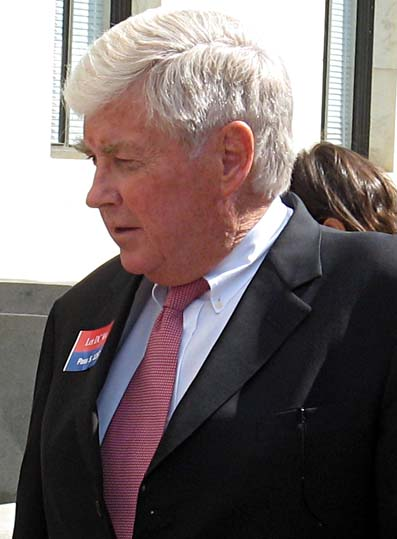
Millard Fillmore (left) and Jack Kemp are associated with the Southtowns

=== Media ===
One broadcast station is explicitly licensed to the Southtowns: MeTV affiliate WBBZ-TV in Springville. The station does not operate from within the southtowns; WBBZ is based in Clarence. Full-service AM radio station WSPQ was licensed to and operated from Springville during its 31-year existence but shut down in 2017. WNYB, a religious station licensed to Jamestown, had its studios in Orchard Park until its owner TCT dropped all local programming.

Several of the Buffalo-licensed broadcasters take advantage of the region's higher topography and have placed their broadcast towers there so that they can reach both the Buffalo region and the Southern Tier. One of the more notable examples is the WIVB tower, which is located in Colden.

The Buffalo News is the primary daily newspaper in the region. Many of the Southtowns communities were served by weekly newspapers until July 2016, when the most recent owner of those newspapers, Community Papers of Western New York, abruptly shut down. Neighbor-to-Neighbor News, a company based in East Aurora, revived many of those newspapers shortly thereafter.

=== People ===
United States President Millard Fillmore resided in East Aurora, where the Seymour Knox I family has held property.

The 1996 vice presidential nominee Jack Kemp represented Hamburg and nearby suburban southtowns regions in the United States House of Representatives.

New York Governor Kathy Hochul graduated from Hamburg High School, and was previously a Hamburg town board member.

The area's current political representatives are state assemblyman David DiPietro, state assemblyman Jonathan Rivera, state senator Patrick Gallivan, and representative Nick Langworthy.
