= Bertrand Chaffee =

Bertrand Chaffee, also known as Bert Chaffee, was a prominent philanthropist, business owner, and farmer in the southern region of Western New York. Born on October 26, 1837, to Joel and Anna Moulton Chaffee in Erie County, New York, he received his education at Springville Academy. Chaffee embarked on his business career at around 16 years old, working as a jewelry store clerk in Cayuga County. He later returned to Erie County and served as a clerk in the office of the Western Transportation Company in Buffalo before settling in the Springville area.

Between 1863 and 1871, Chaffee managed the largest hardware store in Erie County, excluding Buffalo, and acquired half-interest in the Springville flouring mills in partnership with CJ Shuttleworth. He also took on roles such as an election inspector in Springville and served as the town of Concord Supervisor. In 1868, he purchased the William Watkins estate on East Hill in Springville and embarked on a three-year renovation. In 1873, he and CJ Shuttleworth purchased two mills at East Pike, although their partnership ended in 1875, leaving Chaffee as the sole proprietor of the Springville mills. Alongside his business endeavors, Chaffee owned and bred horses that won races at the Buffalo Driving Park and the Erie County Fair. He managed and directed several large farms in the area and played a key role in establishing a syndicate to import Holstein cattle from Europe.

Chaffee's involvement extended to the realm of transportation as well. He played an instrumental role in the construction of the Springville and Sardinia Railroad, serving as its president and general manager from 1887 to 1895. The railroad intersected with the Buffalo and Philadelphia Road at a location that was named Chaffee in his honor.

Active in politics, Chaffee served as the town of Concord Supervisor from 1870 to 1871, ran for assembly, and attended the National Democratic Convention as a delegate in 1876. He also held positions in banking, serving as the vice president of the Farmers Bank in Springville and later becoming a stockholder.

Chaffee's involvement in Freemasonry was notable, and he held various positions within the organization, including Master, Knight Templar, and High Priest of F&AM in Springville. He served three terms as the Deputy Grand Master of the 25th Masonic District of New York and was recognized as the oldest living member at a Freemasons banquet in Springville in 1914.

Known for his philanthropy, Chaffee extended help in various ways. For instance, he once aided his teamster, John Dillon, by providing funds to pay for freight. He also contributed to the establishment of Maplewood Cemetery in Springville by providing the necessary funds to purchase the land. Chaffee's benevolence was evident in other acts as well, as he arranged picnics for children as a reward for their good behavior in Sunday school.

Newspapers of the time reported some whimsical incidents involving Chaffee, such as his window-washing activities using snowballs in December 1910. He was described as a humble individual who didn't mind being the subject of a news item.

On October 3, 1916, Bertrand Chaffee died of apoplexy while driving his buggy. In his will, he left his estate to his wife, Jennie B. Richmond Chaffee, with the provision that she could sell any portion except for the "Springville Homestead," which was to be used for the establishment of a hospital named “Bertrand Chaffee Hospital.” Trustees were appointed to oversee this endeavor, and the hospital, along with the Jennie B. Richmond Nursing Home, was established on the Chaffee homestead in Springville. These institutions stand as lasting legacies of Bertrand Chaffee's generous bequests.

New York State Assembly
Preceded by William A. Johnson	New York State Assembly; Erie County, 5th District; 1876	Succeeded by Charles A. Orr
