= Sardinia, New York =

- Town
- Seal
- Motto: "Progress Through Friendship"
- Location in Erie County and the state of New York.
- Coordinates: 42°33′23″N 78°31′52″W
- Country: United States
- State: New York
- County: Erie
- Named for: Sardinia, Italy

Government
  - Type: Town Council
  - Town Supervisor: Craig Schmitt (R)
  - Town Council: Members' List: • David Montgomery (R); • Norman J. Uhteg (D); • Cheryl L. Earl (R); • Daniel L. Miller (R)

Area
  - Total: 50.41 sq mi (130.56 km^{2})
  - Land: 50.17 sq mi (129.95 km^{2})
  - Water: 0.23 sq mi (0.60 km^{2})
- Elevation: 1,788 ft (545 m)

Population (2020)
  - Total: 2,716
  - Density: 54/sq mi (20.8/km^{2})
- Time zone: UTC-5 (Eastern (EST))
  - Summer (DST): UTC-4 (EDT)
- ZIP Codes: 14134 (Sardinia); 14030 (Chaffee); 14055 (East Concord); 14069 (Glenwood); 14080 (Holland); 14141 (Springville)
- Area code: 716
- FIPS code: 36-029-65277
- GNIS feature ID: 0979463
- Website: www2.erie.gov/Sardinia

Sardinia is a town in Erie County, New York, United States. The town lies in the southeast corner of Erie County and is considered one of the county's "Southtowns". The town is southeast of Buffalo. The population was 2,716 at the 2020 census. The town is reportedly named after an old Christian hymn, Sardinia, and the homonymous Mediterranean island.

== History ==
The area known today as the town of Sardinia was first settled circa 1809. George Richmond, from Vermont, and Ezra Nott are considered the first settlers. By 1810, there were approximately fifteen other families in the area, most of whom lived along Cattaraugus Creek, near Genesee and Savage roads. The town of Sardinia was founded in 1821 from the eastern part of the town of Concord. By 1823, there were farms, churches, a post office, taverns, a carding mill, a woolen factory, a gristmill and a tannery. The hamlet of Chaffee developed by the mid-19th century after the construction of the Springville and Sardinia Railroad. The hamlet of Protection also developed around this time and eventually served as a depot of the Buffalo, New York and Philadelphia Railroad.

=== Historic buildings ===
The town of Sardinia has 38 historic buildings. The Old Sardinia Town Hall, also known as the First Baptist Church of Sardinia and now home to the historical society, and Rider-Hopkins Farm and Olmsted Camp are listed on the National Register of Historic Places.

=== Legal issues ===
A notable lawsuit is Gernatt Asphalt Products, Inc. v. Town of Sardinia, in which the interests of the town were upheld by the New York Court of Appeals in regard to rezoning to prevent mining in 1996.

== Schools ==
Most of Sardinia attends the Pioneer Central School District. Those not served by the Pioneer Central School District attend either the Holland School District or the Springville-Griffith Institute Central School District.

== Geography ==
According to the United States Census Bureau, the town has a total area of 50.4 square miles (130.6 km^{2}), of which 50.2 square miles (130.0 km^{2}) is land and 0.2 square miles (0.6 km^{2}), or 0.46%, is water.

The south town line is defined by Cattaraugus Creek and is the border of Cattaraugus County (town of Yorkshire). The east town line is the border of Wyoming County (town of Arcade). The East Branch of Cazenovia Creek flows northward from Sardinia.

New York State Route 39 crosses the town from west to east, and New York State Route 16 passes through from north to south.

=== Hydrography ===
The town of Sardinia is situated across three watersheds: Cazenovia Creek-Buffalo River watershed to the north; Buffalo Creek watershed to the northeast; and Cattaraugus Creek watershed to the south. Approximately 645 acres (2.61 km^{2}) of land are regulated wetlands by the New York State Department of Environmental Conservation (NYS DEC), while less than 12.4 acres (50,000 m^{2}) are federal wetlands regulated by the United States Army Corps of Engineers (US ACOE). Most regulated wetlands are located on the eastern portion of the town. The main watercourse in the town of Sardinia is Cattaraugus Creek, which is also one of the main waterways in Erie County. Cattaraugus Creek flows southwest towards Lake Erie. Other significant streams include: Hosmer Brook, Dresser Creek, Otis Creek and Richmond Gulf.

== Demographics ==
Historical population
Census	Pop.	Note	%±
1830	1,414		—
1840	1,743		23.3%
1850	1,761		1.0%
1860	1,942		10.3%
1870	1,704		−12.3%
1880	1,767		3.7%
1890	1,728		−2.2%
1900	1,548		−10.4%
1910	1,644		6.2%
1920	1,518		−7.7%
1930	1,518		0.0%
1940	1,700		12.0%
1950	1,778		4.6%
1960	2,145		20.6%
1970	2,505		16.8%
1980	2,792		11.5%
1990	2,667		−4.5%
2000	2,692		0.9%
2010	2,775		3.1%
2020	2,716		−2.1%
U.S. Decennial Census

As of the census of 2000, there were 2,692 people, 944 households, and 731 families residing in the town. The population density was 53.6 inhabitants per square mile (20.7/km^{2}). There were 1,017 housing units at an average density of 20.3 per square mile (7.8/km^{2}). The racial makeup of the town was 97.59% White, 0.33% African American, 0.26% Native American, 0.33% Asian, 0.15% from other races, and 1.34% from two or more races. Hispanic or Latino of any race were 0.59% of the population.

There were 944 households, out of which 36.1% had children under the age of 18 living with them, 67.5% were married couples living together, 6.7% had a female householder with no husband present, and 22.5% were non-families. 17.8% of all households were made up of individuals, and 6.9% had someone living alone who was 65 years of age or older. The average household size was 2.85 and the average family size was 3.21.

In the town, the population was spread out, with 27.8% under the age of 18, 6.1% from 18 to 24, 28.7% from 25 to 44, 26.3% from 45 to 64, and 11.1% who were 65 years of age or older. The median age was 38 years. For every 100 females, there were 100.6 males. For every 100 females age 18 and over, there were 96.1 males.

The median income for a household in the town was $41,025, and the median income for a family was $45,556. Males had a median income of $32,333 versus $20,923 for females. The per capita income for the town was $16,803. About 4.8% of families and 7.8% of the population were below the poverty line, including 6.1% of those under age 18 and 14.5% of those age 65 or over.

== Notable people ==
- Eliza Nelson Fryer, educator and missionary
- Archibald N. Randall, former Wisconsin state senator
- Melville J. Salter, former Lt. Governor of Kansas
- Charles Bennett Smith, former US congressman

== Communities and locations in Sardinia ==
- Chaffee – A hamlet by the east town line on NY-16.
- Colegroves Corners – A former community that became part of Sardinia hamlet.
- Glenwood – A community that includes the ski resort of Kissing Bridge.
- Johnstons Corners – A location formed by the intersection of Allen and Savage roads, west of Chafee.
- Matteson Corners – A former community in the north part of the town.
- Paradise Lake – A small lake north of Sardinia hamlet.
- Pratham – A former community in the town.
- Protection – A location on the northern town line which was once a small community in the town.
- Sardinia – A hamlet in the south part of the town on NY-39.
- Shepards Corners – A location formed by the intersection of Genesee and Warner Gulf roads, south of Scott's Corners.
- Scott's Corners – A location formed by the intersection of Allen and Warner Gulf roads northwest of Sardinia hamlet.
