= Fowlerville, New York =

Fowlerville, New York may refer to:

- Fowlerville, Erie County, New York, a hamlet in Erie County, New York, United States
- Fowlerville, Livingston County, New York, a hamlet and census-designated place in Livingston County, New York, United States
- Fowlerville, Sullivan County, New York, a hamlet in Sullivan County, New York, United States
