= Dygert =

Dygert is a surname. Notable people with the surname include:

- Chloé Dygert (born 1997), American cyclist
- Erwin F. Dygert (1894–1962), American businessman
- George Dygert (1870–1957), American football player and lawyer
- Jimmy Dygert (1884–1936), American baseball player
- Shawn Dygert, American politician
