= WFWC =

WFWC may refer to:

- WFWC-CD, a television station (channel 16, virtual channel 45) licensed to serve Fort Wayne, Indiana, United States
- WFWC-LP, a defunct low-power radio station (99.3 FM) formerly licensed to serve Fremont, North Carolina, United States
- WSPQ, a radio station (1330 AM) licensed to serve Springville, New York, United States, which held the call sign WFWC in 1986
