= Concord, New York =

- Town
- Location in Erie County and the state of New York.

- Location of New York in the United States
- Coordinates: 42°33′N 78°42′W
- Country: United States
- State: New York
- County: Erie
- Incorporated: 1812
- Named for: Concord, Massachusetts

Government
  - Supervisor: Philip Drozd Town Board: Kimberly S. Krezmien; Clyde Drake; Kenneth D. Zittel; William F. Snyder, III

Area
  - Total: 70.09 sq mi (181.54 km^{2})
  - Land: 69.93 sq mi (181.13 km^{2})
  - Water: 0.16 sq mi (0.41 km^{2})
- Elevation: 1,660 ft (510 m)

Population (2020)
  - Total: 8,316 ▼
  - Density: 121.9/sq mi (47.06/km^{2})
- Time zone: UTC-5 (EST)
  - Summer (DST): UTC-4 (EDT)
- ZIP Codes: 14141 (Springville); 14055 (East Concord); 14069 (Glenwood); 14025 (Boston)
- Area code: 716
- FIPS code: 36-029-17585
- Website: www.townofconcordny.com

Concord is a town in Erie County, New York, United States. The population was 8,494 at the 2010 census. The town is believed to be named after Concord, Massachusetts, by early settlers from New England.

Concord is on the southeastern border of Erie County. Its principal community is the village of Springville. Concord is one of the "Southtowns" of Erie County.

== History ==
Concord was first settled around 1807, and it was established as a town in 1812 from the town of Willink (now defunct). At the time of its formation, the town stretched across the entire south part of the county. The town lost much of its territory in the subsequent formation of the Towns of Collins, North Collins, and Sardinia.

== Notable people from Concord ==
- Amos Eaton, notable scientist
- George T. Day, pastor and writer
- Elon Howard Eaton, ornithologist and author, born in Concord in 1866
- Thomas M. Reynolds, former U.S. Congressman
- Thomas J. Shear, former Wisconsin State Assemblyman
- Jack Yellen (1892 – 1991), American lyricist and screenwriter

== Geography ==
According to the United States Census Bureau, the town has a total area of 70.1 square miles (181.5 km^{2}), of which 69.9 square miles (181.1 km^{2}) is land and 0.15 square miles (0.4 km^{2}), or 0.23%, is water.

The south town line, marked by Cattaraugus Creek, is the northern border of Cattaraugus County.

U.S. Route 219 (north-south) passes through the middle of the town, and New York State Route 240 passes along the eastern side. New York State Route 39 crosses the town from west to east.

== Demographics ==
Historical population
Census	Pop.	Note	%±
1820	2,786		—
1830	1,924		−30.9%
1840	3,021		57.0%
1850	3,242		7.3%
1860	3,183		−1.8%
1870	3,171		−0.4%
1880	3,400		7.2%
1890	3,881		14.1%
1900	4,086		5.3%
1910	4,391		7.5%
1920	4,223		−3.8%
1930	4,453		5.4%
1940	4,524		1.6%
1950	5,291		17.0%
1960	6,452		21.9%
1970	7,573		17.4%
1980	8,171		7.9%
1990	8,387		2.6%
2000	8,526		1.7%
2010	8,494		−0.4%
2020	8,316		−2.1%
U.S. Decennial Census

As of the census of 2000, there were 8,526 people, 3,264 households, and 2,268 families residing in the town. The population density was 121.6 inhabitants per square mile (47.0/km^{2}). There were 3,449 housing units at an average density of 49.2 per square mile (19.0/km^{2}). The racial makeup of the town was 98.40% White, 0.50% African American, 0.16% Native American, 0.25% Asian, 0.04% Pacific Islander, 0.19% from other races, and 0.46% from two or more races. Hispanic or Latino of any race were 1.24% of the population.

There were 3,264 households, out of which 32.7% had children under the age of 18 living with them, 57.0% were married couples living together, 8.6% had a female householder with no husband present, and 30.5% were non-families. 25.5% of all households were made up of individuals, and 12.3% had someone living alone who was 65 years of age or older. The average household size was 2.55 and the average family size was 3.07.

In the town, the population was spread out, with 25.6% under the age of 18, 6.8% from 18 to 24, 28.2% from 25 to 44, 24.2% from 45 to 64, and 15.1% who were 65 years of age or older. The median age was 39 years. For every 100 females, there were 95.2 males. For every 100 females age 18 and over, there were 91.6 males.

The median income for a household in the town was $40,891, and the median income for a family was $49,848. Males had a median income of $38,930 versus $24,531 for females. The per capita income for the town was $19,477. About 4.3% of families and 6.6% of the population were below the poverty line, including 8.4% of those under age 18 and 3.8% of those age 65 or over.

== Communities and locations in Concord ==
- Concord – The hamlet of Concord, centrally located in the town.
- Craneridge – A subdivision in the northeast corner of Concord.
- East Concord – A hamlet by the east town line on Genesee Road.
- Footes – A location in the southeast part of the town.
- Fowlerville – A location near the northern town line.
- Kahes Bridge – An historical location in the town.
- Kissing Bridge – A ski resort in the northeast corner of the town on NY-240.
- Morton Corners – The location in the southwest part of the town, west of Springville on NY-39.
- Scoby Power Plant and Dam – A former hydroelectric dam on Cattaraugus Creek along the town's southern border. Currently the home of Scoby Dam Park, operated by Erie County.
- Sprague Brook County Park – a county park north of Footes.
- Springville – The Village of Springville is near the south town line at routes NY-39 and NY-240, along with US-219.
- Woodside – A hamlet near the west town line.
- Wyandale (formerly "Woodwards Hollow") – A hamlet in the northwest part of the town.
