= East Hill Historic District (Springville, New York) =

Historic district in New York, United States

- U.S. National Register of Historic Places
- U.S. Historic district
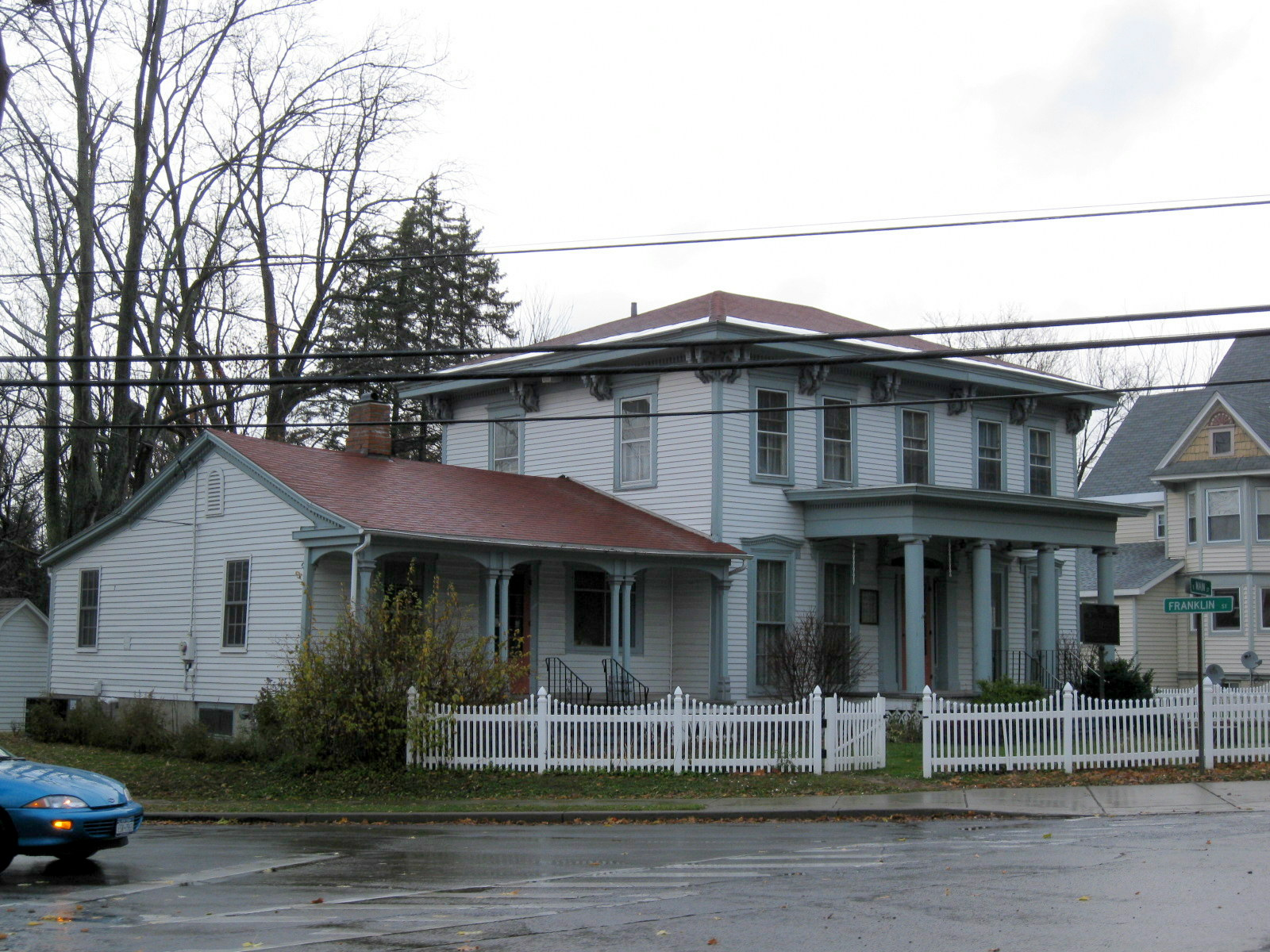
- Warner Historical Museum, November 2009

- Location within New York Location within the United States
- Location: 98-367 E. Main St., Springville, New York
- Coordinates: 42°30′30″N 78°39′30″W
- Area: 53.26 acres (21.55 ha)
- Built: c. 1835-1935
- Architectural style: Greek Revival, Italianate, Queen Anne, Stick/Eastlake, Shingle Style, Colonial Revival, Bungalow/Craftsman
- NRHP reference No.: 15000512
- Added to NRHP: August 5, 2015

East Hill Historic District is a national historic district located at Springville in Erie County, New York. The district encompasses 59 contributing buildings and 2 contributing objects in the original residential district of the village of Springville. The district includes a variety of residential buildings built between about 1835 and 1935. It includes notable examples of Greek Revival, Italianate, Queen Anne, Colonial Revival, and Bungalow / American Craftsman style architecture. Notable buildings include the George E. Crandall House / Warner Museum (c. 1849), Frank O. Smith House (c. 1890), C.J. Shuttleworth House (c. 1870), Morris Hall House (1892), and Inez Wiggins House (c. 1935).

It was listed on the National Register of Historic Places in 2015.
