= Erwin F. Dygert =

- Born: August 18, 1894
- Died: August 5, 1962 (aged 67)
- Occupations: Businessman, racetrack owner, horse importer
- Spouse(s): Jane Greer, Beulah Farmer

Erwin F. Dygert (August 18, 1894 – August 5, 1962) was an importer of horses into the United States. He brought the last Belgian horses out of Europe before World War II prevented any more exports.

He was also involved in harness racing, first at Aurora Downs in Aurora, Illinois, then at Hawthorne Race Course. The Erwin F. Dygert Memorial Trot, run at Hawthorne, is named after him. In 1954, Dygert founded and was the sole proprietor of Suburban Downs, Inc., a harness racing association that began operations at Maywood Park under a lease agreement.

Erwin Dygert married and had three children: Mary (Dills), Erwin R. "Bill", Marjorie (Wallace), and Gloria (Morrison). His first wife, Jane Greer of Ellicottville, NY died and he later married Beulah Dygert (Farmer) of Danville, Illinois. Beulah continued to work at the Hawthorne Race Course until her late eighties.

His family owns Dygert Farm on Elk St. in Springville, New York, home to the Erie County Fair, and where Pop Warner trained Jim Thorpe for the 1912 Olympics.
