= Footes, New York =

Hamlet in New York, United States

Coordinates: 42°35′06″N 78°38′40″W

Footes is a small hamlet in the town of Concord in southern Erie County, New York, United States.
