= WSPQ =

Springville, New York; United States
- Broadcast area: Buffalo metropolitan area
- Frequency: 1330 kHz
- Branding: 1330 AM WSPQ

Programming
- Format: Defunct (previously Classic Hits)

Ownership
- Owner: Terrance Grant; (Biscuit Communications)

History
- First air date: May 8, 1986; 39 years ago
- Last air date: December 31, 2017
- Former call signs: WSPQ (1986–91); WFWC (1991–94)
- Call sign meaning: W SPringville Q

Technical information
- Facility ID: 26452
- Class: B
- Power: 1,000 watts
- Transmitter coordinates: 42°29′53″N 78°41′10″W

WSPQ (1330 AM) was a radio station licensed to Springville, New York. WSPQ served the Southtowns region of Western New York from 1986 to 2017, when the station went off the air. The license was cancelled by the Federal Communications Commission on August 27, 2019.

== History ==
=== Full Service Radio ===
The station signed on the air on May 8, 1986. WSPQ originally carried a full-service format. Throughout its existence it served as an affiliate for the Buffalo Bills Radio Network and carried local high school sports as well. Fred Haier served as the station's long-running morning host, hosting Tradio and a weekly classic country show as well. Howard Boundy, who began at the station playing novelty songs, served as a board operator for the station's entire existence.

During the early 2000s, the format included syndicated talk radio shows. At the time of the station's closure, it had been a classic hits-formatted station for approximately a decade. For a time in the mid-to-late 2000s, WSPQ streamed its programming on the Internet. It did not do so for its last decade on air. In 2005, Terrance Grant, through holding company Hawk Communications, purchased the station.

=== Shut Down ===
The station ran into financial problems and shut down on December 31, 2017. Grant blamed a declining Western New York economy, WSPQ's small broadcast range (even its daytime signal only covered a mostly rural area spanning 20 miles from the transmitter), increasing expenses and a 2015 transformer failure for the station's lack of profitability.

The station has filed paperwork with the FCC to remain silent through the end of 2018. At that point its license would have to be returned to the FCC. In the filing, the station noted that it had lost $73,000 between the 2015 transmitter failure and its cessation of broadcasting.

=== Attempted Sale ===
On February 12, 2018, Chris Lash (who grew up in nearby Northwest Pennsylvania and is known for his flipping of AM radio stations) announced his intention to purchase the station and return it to air the following month. The revived station was to carry The True Oldies Channel and be targeted at the Buffalo market, with the intent of adding an FM translator.

On May 11, 2018, Lash announced he was withdrawing his agreement to purchase the station, as much of the station's equipment had been stolen during the winter of 2018. The telecommunications providers in the area were unable to provide a studio/transmitter link to the broadcast tower. Under the terms of the Telecommunications Act of 1996, Grant had until the end of 2018 to find another buyer and put the station back on the air before its license would be forfeited. WSPQ's license was cancelled on August 27, 2019. Lash died in November 2021.
