= Niagara Frontier =

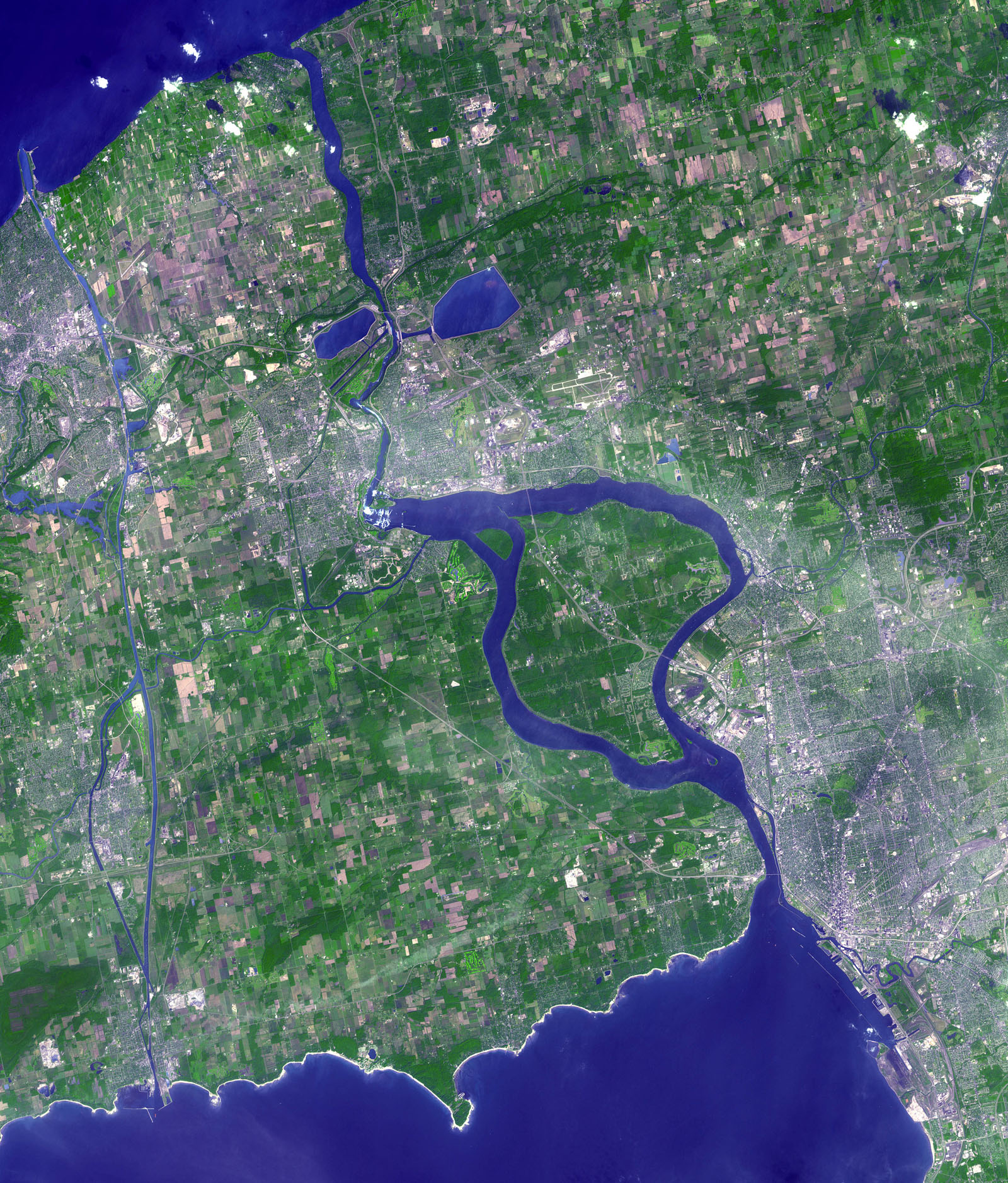
- Niagara Frontier from space

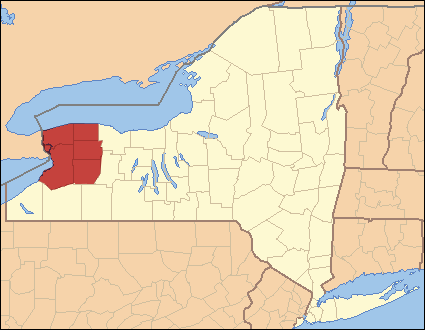
- Location of the Niagara Frontier in New York. ██ Niagara Frontier ██ Rest of New York State
- Country: United States
- State: New York
- Largest City: Buffalo

The Niagara Frontier refers to the stretch of land in the United States that is south of Lake Ontario and north of Lake Erie, and extends westward to Cleveland, Ohio. The term dates to the War of 1812, when the northern border was in contention between the United States and British forces in Canada. It refers only to the land east of the Niagara River and north of Lake Erie within the United States. The western side of the Niagara River, on the Canada/Ontario side, is the Niagara Peninsula; it is considered part of the Golden Horseshoe.

The Niagara Frontier is part of the region known as Western New York State. The Niagara Frontier also forms the eastern part of the Great Lakes North Coast. Its southeastern boundary forms what is known as ski country, as it includes the northernmost area of the Appalachian Mountain foothills.

The National Weather Service office in Buffalo, New York defines the Niagara Frontier as the following:

- Erie County, New York north of US 20A – includes Buffalo, New York
- Niagara County, New York – includes Niagara Falls, New York
- Orleans County, New York
- Genesee County, New York – includes Batavia, New York

Other, less common, definitions may include the following areas:

- Erie County, NY south of US 20A (also known as the Buffalo Southtowns)
- Chautauqua County, New York (particularly the area that is part of the Lake Erie watershed, north and west of the Chautauqua Ridge. The southeastern part of the county, in the Conewango Creek watershed, is not part of the Niagara Frontier. It is considered part of the adjacent Southern Tier to the east)
- Erie County, Pennsylvania – includes Erie, Pennsylvania
- Ashtabula County, Ohio
- Lake County, Ohio
- Cuyahoga County, Ohio – includes Cleveland, Ohio

== History ==
The 17th-century Jesuit Relations recorded numerous now-obscure Iroquoian groups living along the Niagara Frontier. Even at that time it was a frontier zone, albeit between the Neutral, Erie, and Five Nations Iroquois confederacies, which were located to the west, south, and east respectively. One of the few well-attested Niagara Iroquoian groups, the Wenro, has never had its homeland concretely located by scholars, though some sites on the south shore of Lake Ontario have been identified with them. There is some historiographical confusion as to which groups were distinct from each other and which may simply have been the same groups known by different names recorded by different chroniclers. One example, the Kakouagoga or Kahkwa people, are only mentioned in a handful of written sources, but may have had their territory near the modern city of Buffalo.

== See also ==
- Buffalo Niagara Region
