= Concord (hamlet), New York =

Hamlet in New York, United States

Coordinates: 42°32′07″N 78°43′51″W

Concord is a small hamlet in the town of Concord in southern Erie County, New York, United States.
