= Springville and Sardinia Railroad =

Springville and Sardinia
Overview
- Headquarters: Springville
- Locale: New York
- Dates of operation: 1878–1886

Technical
- Track gauge: 3 ft (914 mm)

The Springville and Sardinia Railroad was an 11.57 mile 3 ft (914 mm) narrow gauge railroad organized by Springville, New York interests on May 6, 1878 from Sardinia Junction (now the hamlet of Chaffee) with the Pennsylvania Railroad through Sardinia to Springville. It proved to be unprofitable once the Buffalo, Rochester, and Pittsburgh Railway was completed in 1883 and the tracks were pulled up in 1886.
