= Wyandale, New York =

Hamlet in New York, United States

Coordinates: 42°33′19″N 78°45′56″W

Wyandale is a hamlet in the town of Concord in southern Erie County, New York, United States. It was formerly known as "Woodwards Hollow". Its name is believed to be derived from the Wyandotte hens owned by a local farmer.
