= Springville, New York =

- Village
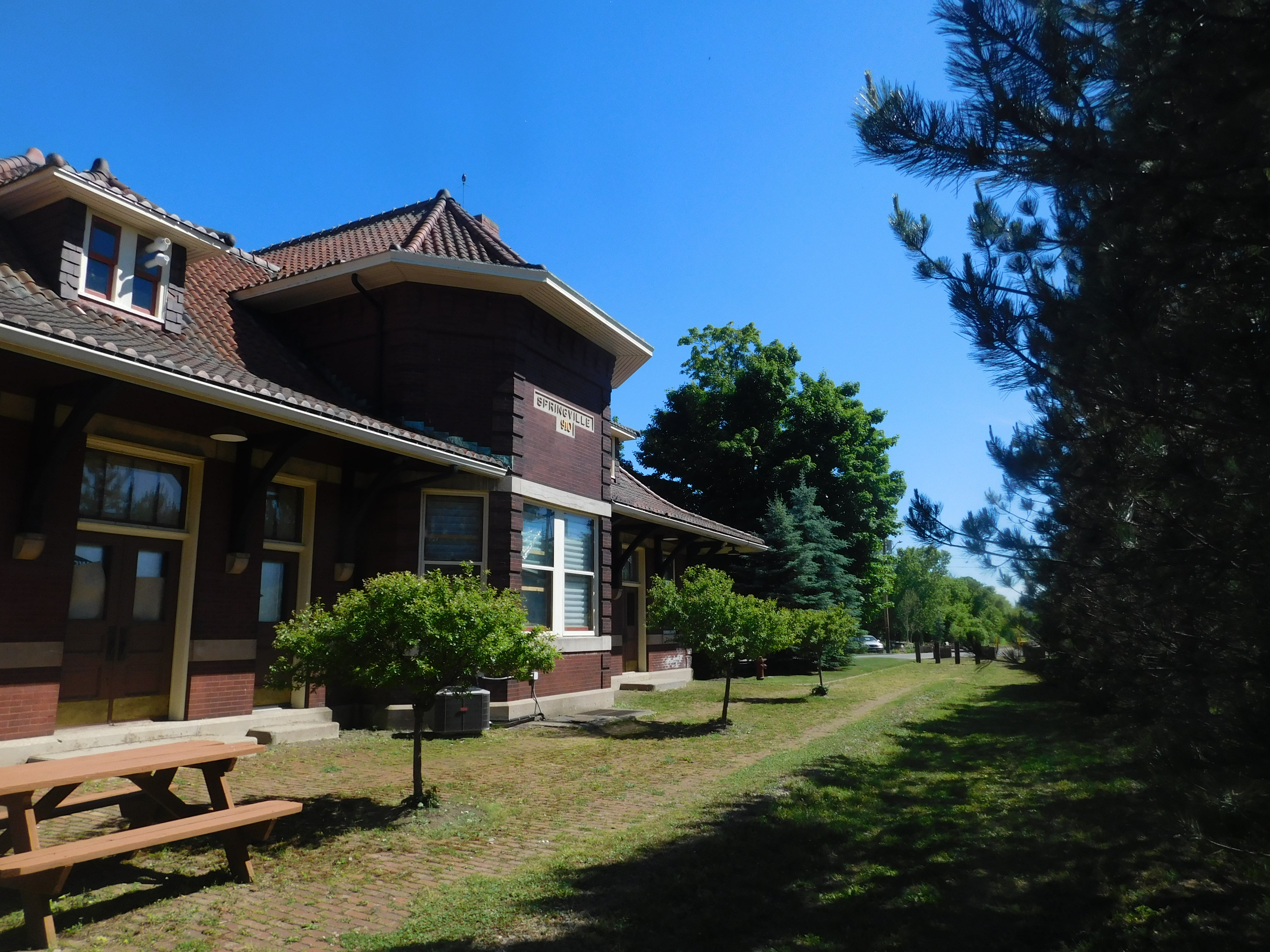
- The former Springville depot for the Buffalo, Rochester and Pittsburgh Railroad in June 2016.

- Flag Seal
- Nickname: Cold Springs
- Location in Erie County and the state of New York
- Coordinates: 42°30′34″N 78°40′11″W
- Country: United States
- State: New York
- County: Erie
- Town: Concord
- Incorporated: 1834

Area
  - Total: 3.69 sq mi (9.56 km^{2})
  - Land: 3.68 sq mi (9.53 km^{2})
  - Water: 0.0077 sq mi (0.02 km^{2})
- Elevation: 1,329 ft (405 m)

Population (2020)
  - Total: 4,225
  - Density: 1,148.0/sq mi (443.26/km^{2})
- Time zone: UTC-5 (Eastern (EST))
  - Summer (DST): UTC-4 (EDT)
- ZIP code: 14141
- Area code: 716
- FIPS code: 36-70442
- GNIS feature ID: 0966106
- Website: www.villageofspringvilleny.gov

Springville is a village in the southeastern section of the town of Concord in Erie County, New York, United States. Springville is the principal community in the town and a major business location in the "southtowns" of Erie County. As of the 2020 census, Springville had a population of 4,225. It is part of the Buffalo-Niagara Falls metropolitan area. Springville was originally named "Fiddler's Green" before it was renamed "Springville". Springville is well known for being home to Glenn "Pop" Warner, an important figure in American Football history.

== History ==
In 1808, Samuel Cochran became the first permanent settler in the town; it had been a tract of land once known as Holland Purchase. The Springville Academy, opening in 1830, became the first high school in Erie County. It was given its current name, Springville Griffith Institute, in 1867 to honor Archibald Griffith, a donor. The village of Springville was incorporated in 1834 from part of the town of Concord. The Dygert Farm on Elk Street was the site of the 1866 and 1867 Erie County Fair, and also served as training grounds for Jim Thorpe.

The Springville post office contains a mural, Fiddler's Green, painted in 1939 by Victoria Hutson Huntley. Federally commissioned murals were produced from 1934 to 1943 in the United States through the Section of Painting and Sculpture, later called the Section of Fine Arts, of the Treasury Department.

Springville is home to five National Register of Historic Places-listed (NRHP) buildings (Citizens National Bank; Buffalo, Rochester and Pittsburgh Railroad Station; Baptist Church of Springville; United States Post Office; Scoby Power Plant and Dam) and the NRHP-listed East Main-Mechanic Streets Historic District and East Hill Historic District.

== Geography ==
According to the United States Census Bureau, the village has a total area of 3.7 square miles (9.6 km^{2}), of which 3.7 square miles (9.6 km^{2}) is land and 0.27% is water.

Cattaraugus Creek and Cattaraugus County are south of the village.

New York State Route 39 (NY 39), a major east–west truck road, becomes Main Street upon entering Springville. U.S. Route 219, the Southern Expressway, passes just west of the village. NY 240 (Vaughn Street), a major north–south truck road, marks the east border of the village.

== Demographics ==
Historical population
Census	Pop.	Note	%±
1870	1,006		—
1880	1,227		22.0%
1890	1,883		53.5%
1900	1,992		5.8%
1910	2,246		12.8%
1920	2,331		3.8%
1930	2,540		9.0%
1940	2,849		12.2%
1950	3,322		16.6%
1960	3,852		16.0%
1970	4,350		12.9%
1980	4,285		−1.5%
1990	4,310		0.6%
2000	4,252		−1.3%
2010	4,296		1.0%
2020	4,225		−1.7%
U.S. Decennial Census

=== 2020 census ===
As of the 2020 census, Springville had a population of 4,225. The median age was 43.4 years. 20.9% of residents were under the age of 18 and 22.2% of residents were 65 years of age or older. For every 100 females there were 94.0 males, and for every 100 females age 18 and over there were 92.0 males age 18 and over.

0.0% of residents lived in urban areas, while 100.0% lived in rural areas.

There were 1,818 households in Springville, of which 26.5% had children under the age of 18 living in them. Of all households, 40.9% were married-couple households, 21.3% were households with a male householder and no spouse or partner present, and 29.6% were households with a female householder and no spouse or partner present. About 35.2% of all households were made up of individuals and 16.2% had someone living alone who was 65 years of age or older.

There were 1,958 housing units, of which 7.2% were vacant. The homeowner vacancy rate was 1.3% and the rental vacancy rate was 4.6%.

Racial composition as of the 2020 census
Race	Number	Percent
White	3,952	93.5%
Black or African American	37	0.9%
American Indian and Alaska Native	20	0.5%
Asian	24	0.6%
Native Hawaiian and Other Pacific Islander	0	0.0%
Some other race	29	0.7%
Two or more races	163	3.9%
Hispanic or Latino (of any race)	90	2.1%

=== 2000 census ===
As of the census of 2000, there were 4,252 people, 1,705 households, and 1,091 families residing in the village. The population density was 1,164.4 inhabitants per square mile (449.6/km^{2}). There were 1,798 housing units at an average density of 492.4 per square mile (190.1/km^{2}). The racial makeup of the village was 98.28% White, 0.49% African American, 0.21% Native American, 0.40% Asian, 0.02% Pacific Islander, 0.19% from other races, and 0.40% from two or more races. Hispanic or Latino of any race were 0.61% of the population.

There were 1,705 households, out of which 31.4% had children under the age of 18 living with them, 49.3% were married couples living together, 10.3% had a female householder with no husband present, and 36.0% were non-families. 31.5% of all households were made up of individuals, and 16.3% had someone living alone who was 65 years of age or older. The average household size was 2.40 and the average family size was 3.01.

The population was spread out in the village with 25.1% under the age of 18, 7.1% from 18 to 24, 26.9% from 25 to 44, 21.8% from 45 to 64, and 19.1% who were 65 years of age or older. The median age was 40 years. For every 100 females, there were 85.8 males. For every 100 females age 18 and over, there were 82.1 males.

The median income for a household in the village was $38,221, and the median income for a family was $49,422. Males had a median income of $39,452 versus $24,621 for females. The per capita income for the village was $19,302. About 5.4% of families and 7.4% of the population were below the poverty line, including 11.0% of those under age 18 and 3.5% of those age 65 or over.

== Notable people ==
- Bertrand Chaffee, businessman, farmer, and philanthropist; president of the Springville and Sardinia Railroad
- Joseph Gallup Cochran (1817–1871), Presbyterian missionary, minister, teacher, and translator.
- C. DeForest Cummings, former Syracuse Orange football coach
- Emmons Dunbar, agriculturalist, college football coach
- Erwin F. Dygert, noted importer of Belgian horses, and harness racing
- Elon Howard Eaton, ornithologist, attended school in Springville
- Ken Knowlton, computer graphics pioneer
- Asher P. Nichols, state senator
- Fletcher Pratt, author and historian
- Tom Reynolds, Republican politician
- George Schuster, driver in the 1908 New York to Paris Auto Race
- Allen D. Scott, former New York state senator
- Bill Simon, songwriter (with Jack Yellen), jazz critic, saxophonist
- Joey Snyder III, pro golfer
- Bill Warner, college football coach, brother of Pop Warner
- Pop Warner, coach, prompter, helped shape football into the form it is played today
- Christine Weidinger, opera singer
- Jack Yellen, songwriter (including "Ain't She Sweet" and the Franklin D. Roosevelt campaign tune "Happy Days Are Here Again")

== Arts and culture ==
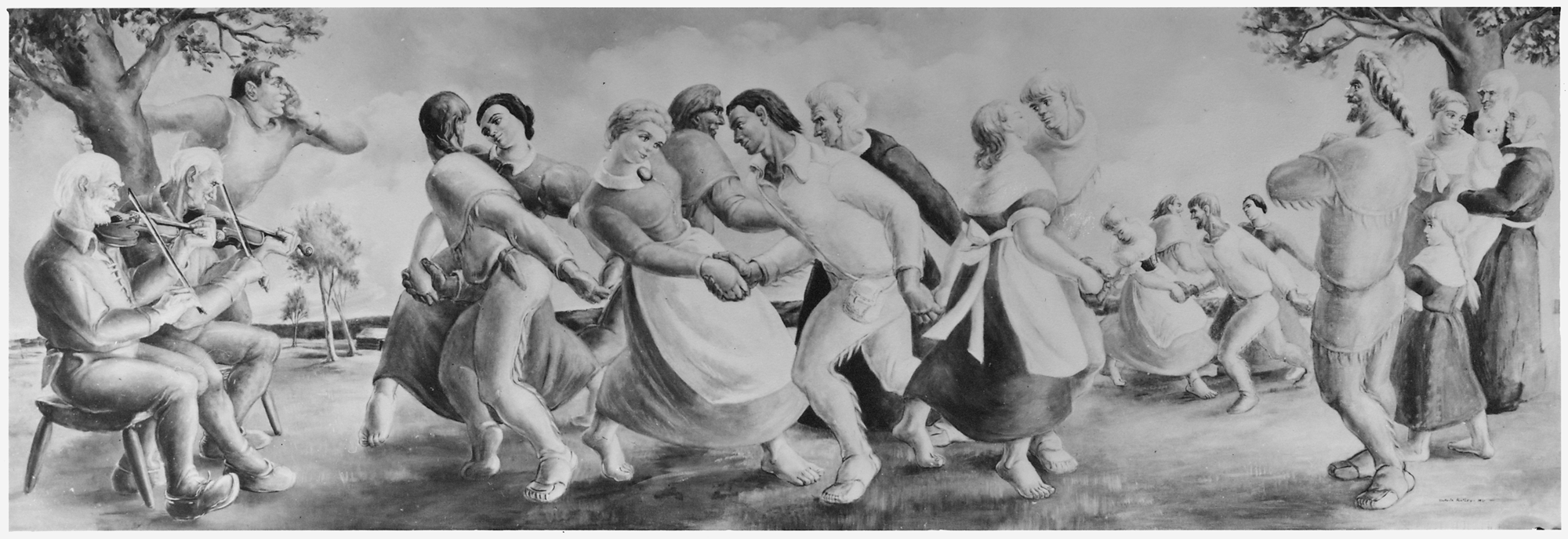
Victoria H. Huntley post office mural

- Springville Center for the Arts - A community multi-arts center that produces theater shows, gallery exhibits, workshops and more. The original establishment closed in 2007. Their new establishment is the former Baptist Church building at the corner of North Buffalo Street and Franklin Street.

== Schools ==
- Springville-Griffith Institute Central School District
