= United States Post Office (Springville, New York) =

- US Post Office--Springville
- U.S. National Register of Historic Places
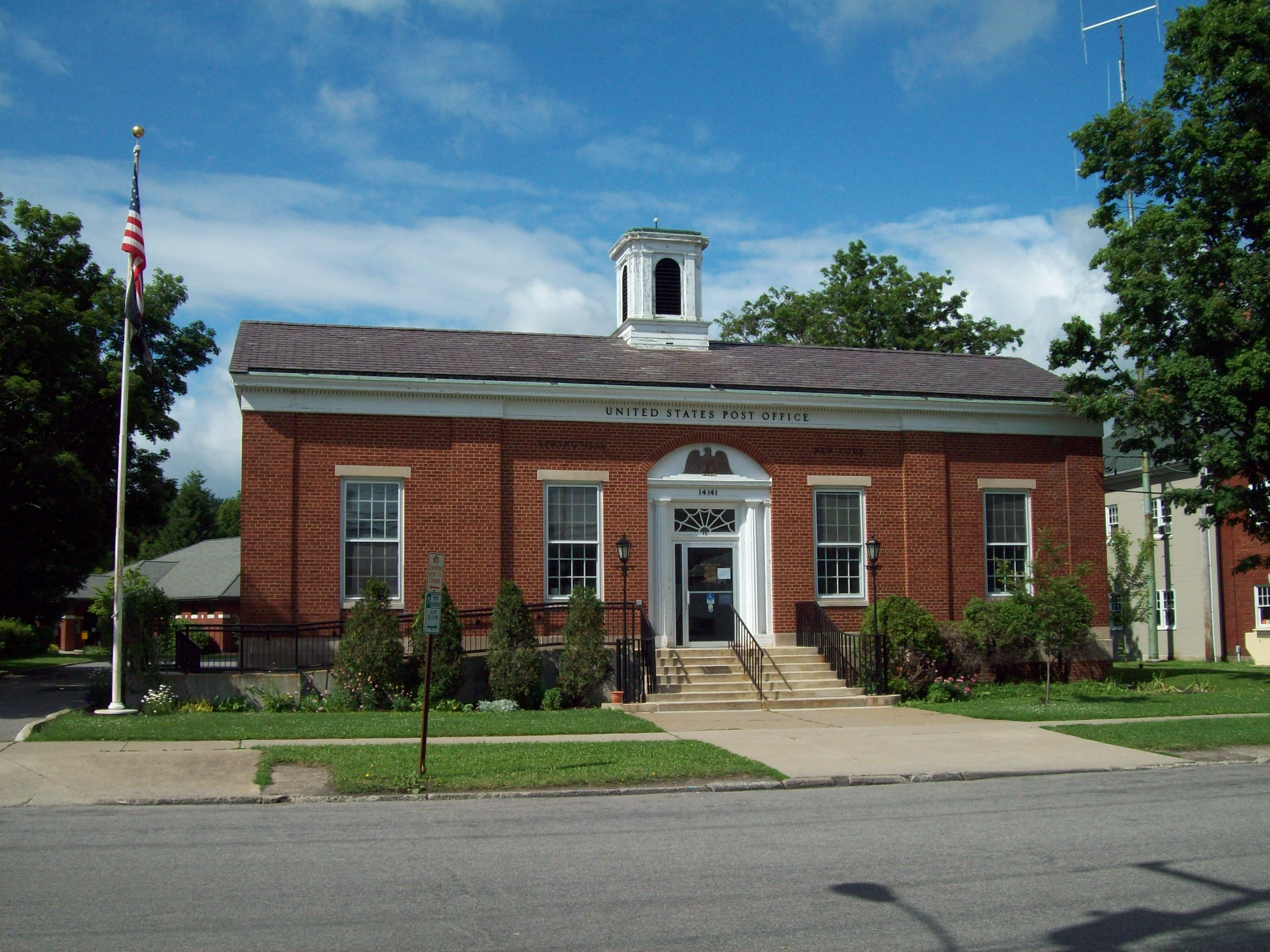
- US Post Office-Springville, NY, June 2009

- Location within New York Location within the United States
- Location: 75 Franklin St., Springville, New York
- Coordinates: 42°30′34″N 78°39′58″W
- Built: 1936
- Architect: Simon, Louis A.; Huntley, Victoria Hutson
- Architectural style: Colonial Revival
- MPS: US Post Offices in New York State, 1858-1943, TR
- NRHP reference No.: 88002433
- Added to NRHP: May 11, 1989

US Post Office—Springville is a historic post office building located at Springville in Erie County, New York. It was designed and built in 1936–1937, and is one of a number of post offices in New York State designed by the Office of the Supervising Architect of the Treasury Department under Louis A. Simon. The building is in the Colonial Revival style and is a one-story brick structure crowned by a square, flat-topped cupola. The lobby features a mural by Victoria Hutson Huntley, painted in 1938, titled "Fiddler's Green."

It was listed on the National Register of Historic Places in 1989.
