= Protection, New York =

Hamlet in New York, United States

Coordinates: 42°36′31″N 78°29′39″W

Protection is a hamlet in the town of Holland and Sardinia in southern Erie County, New York, United States.
