= Woodside, Erie County, New York =

Hamlet in New York, United States

Coordinates: 42°31′18″N 78°45′54″W

Woodside is a hamlet in the town of Concord in southern Erie County, New York, United States.
