= Fowlerville, Erie County, New York =

Fowlerville
- Hamlet
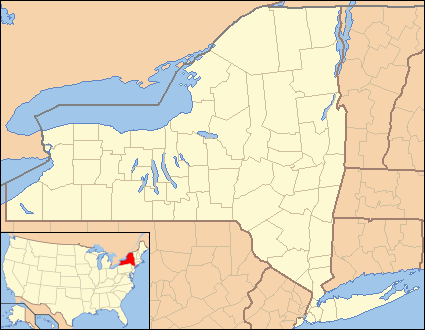
- Location within the state of New York
- Coordinates: 42°36′08″N 078°43′00″W
- Country: United States
- State: New York
- County: Erie County
- Town: Concord
- Elevation: 1,017 ft (310 m)
- Time zone: UTC-5 (Eastern (EST))
  - Summer (DST): UTC-4 (EDT)
- Area code: 716
- FIPS code: 36-27122
- GNIS feature ID: 950549

Fowlerville is a small hamlet in the town of Concord, in southern Erie County, New York, United States.

It should not be confused with other New York hamlets named Fowlerville in Livingston County and Sullivan County, or with the similarly named hamlet of Fowlersville in Lewis County.

== Geography ==
Fowlerville is located at 42°36′08″N 078°43′00″W (42.6022831, -78.7166947) in Erie County. Its elevation is 1,017 feet (310 m).
