= Victoria Hutson Huntley =

American painter

- Born: 1900; Hasbrouck Heights, New Jersey
- Died: 1971 (aged 70–71); Arlington, Virginia
- Spouse: Ralph Huntley

Victoria Ebbels Hutson Huntley (1900 Hasbrouck Heights, New Jersey – 1971 Arlington, Virginia) was an American artist, and printmaker.

== Life ==
Huntley grew up in New York City, and studied at the New York School of Fine and Applied Art and the Art Students League of New York. She studied under John Sloan, Max Weber, and Kenneth Hayes Miller and was awarded First Prize in Lithography in the International Graphic Art Show at the Chicago Art Institute. In 1933 her lithograph, Koppers Coke, was awarded First Prize in Lithography in the National Exhibition of the Philadelphia Print Club.

She married a physicist, Ralph Huntley. She taught at the Birch Wathen Lenox School, from 1934 to 1942. Later in the 1940s she was Resident Artist at the Pomfret School in Connecticut. In 1939, she painted a mural, The Packet Sails from Greenwich, at the post office in Greenwich, Connecticut, and another, Fiddler's Green, in Springville, New York as part of the Treasury Section of Fine Arts.

Her papers are held at the Archives of American Art. In 1942 she was elected into the National Academy of Design as an Associate Academician.

Her work is represented in the New York Public Library, the Metropolitan Museum of Art, The Boston Museum of Fine Arts, the Chicago Art Institute, the Pennsylvania Academy of Fine Arts, the Cleveland Museum of Art, and the Whitney Museum.
