= Fillmore House =

Historic house in New York, United States

- Millard Fillmore House
- U.S. National Register of Historic Places
- U.S. National Historic Landmark
- New York State Register of Historic Places
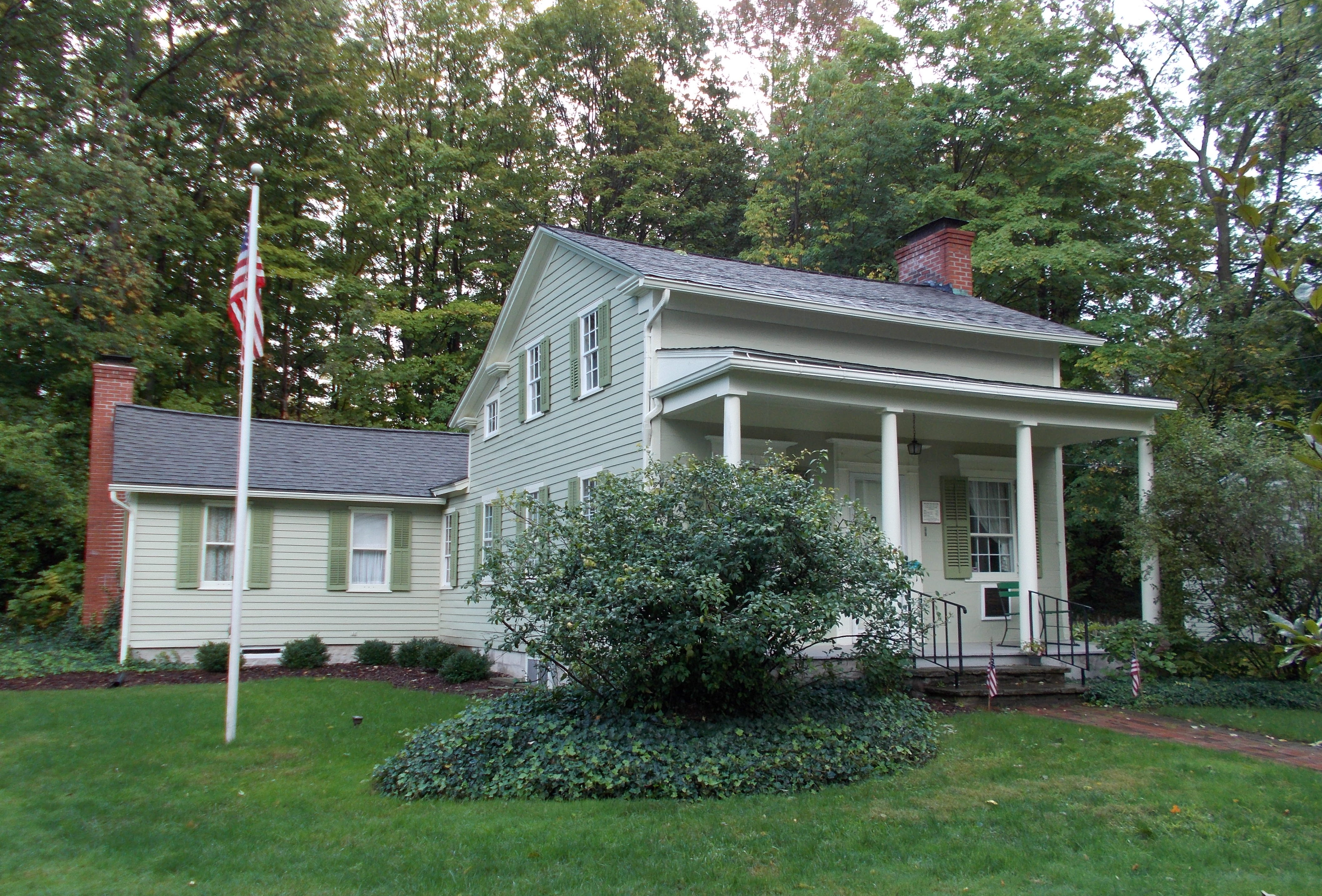
- Millard Fillmore House, September 2012

- Location within New York Location within the United States
- Interactive map showing the location of Millard Fillmore House
- Location: 24 Shearer Avenue, East Aurora, New York
- Coordinates: 42°46′5.87″N 78°37′21.02″W
- Area: less than one acre
- Built: 1826
- NRHP reference No.: 74001235
- NYSRHP No.: 02952.000003

Significant dates
- Added to NRHP: May 30, 1974
- Designated NHL: May 30, 1974
- Designated NYSRHP: June 23, 1980

The Millard Fillmore House is a historic house museum at 24 Shearer Avenue in East Aurora in Erie County, New York. Built in 1826, it was from then until 1830 the residence of the 13th president of the United States, Millard Fillmore. It has been moved twice and significantly altered. It was designated a National Historic Landmark in 1974. The house is owned by the Aurora Historical Society and has been decorated with period furnishings. As of 2022, it is open for tours by reservation only.

== Description and history ==
The Fillmore House stands on the east side of Shearer Avenue north of Main Street, west of the village center of East Aurora. It is a 1 1/2-story wood-frame structure, with a gabled roof and clapboarded exterior. A shed-roof porch with round columns extends across the three-bay front facade. A brick chimney rises on the right side, and a series of single-story ells, not original to the building, extend to the rear. The building is not architecturally distinguished.

Millard Fillmore built this house in 1826 on a property on Main Street. Fillmore had just married, and established a law practice with an office (no longer extant) across the road. Fillmore's son was born in this house before the Fillmores moved to Buffalo in 1830. After the Fillmore occupancy, the building had multiple owners and multiple additions made to it. In 1915, it was moved further back on its original lot to make room for a theater. At that site it was abandoned and fell into decay until 1930, when it was rescued by Margaret and Irving Price. They moved the original core of the building to its current location and oversaw its restoration for use as a home and artist's studio for Margaret. It was acquired by the Aurora Historical Society in 1975, and restored in appearance to the period of Fillmore's ownership.

== Gallery ==
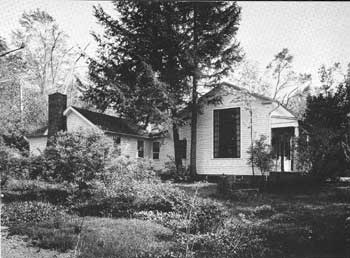
The Fillmore House, 1976.

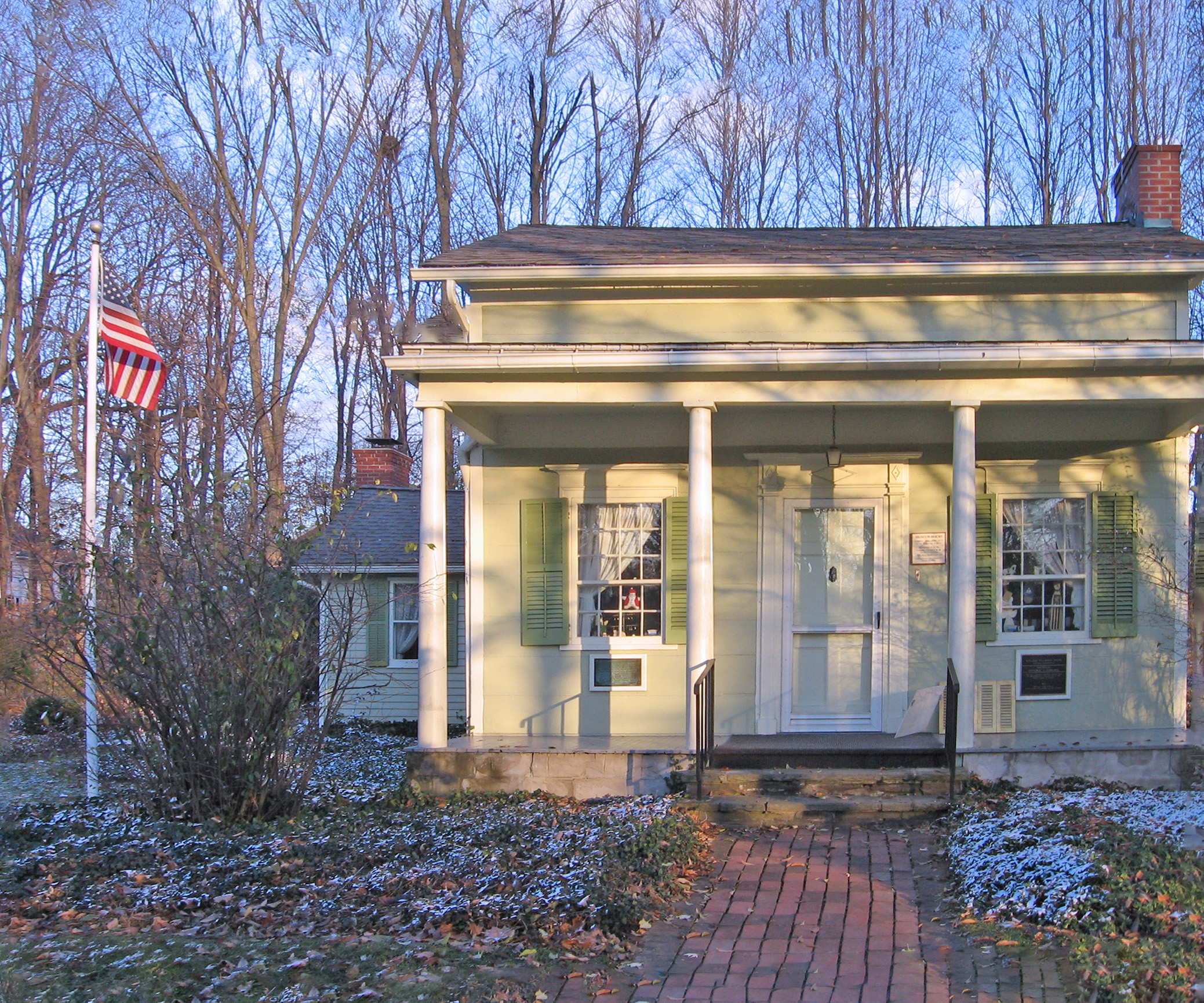
Another view of the house

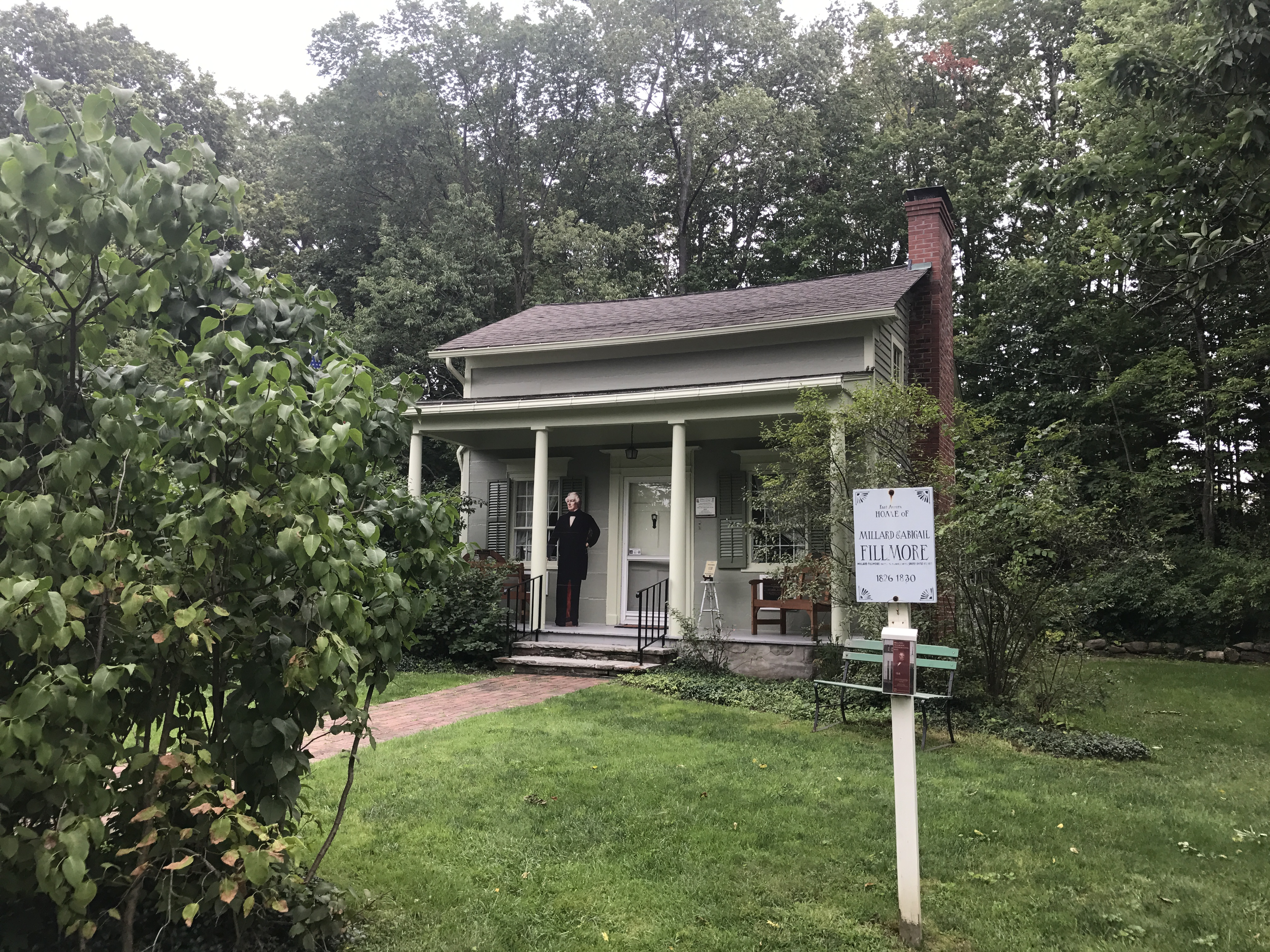
Millard Fillmore House 2017

== See also ==
- List of residences of presidents of the United States
- Presidential memorials in the United States
- National Register of Historic Places listings in Erie County, New York
- List of National Historic Landmarks in New York
