= Chaffee, New York =

Hamlet in New York, United States

Coordinates: 42°34′05″N 78°28′44″W

Chaffee is a small hamlet in the town of Sardinia in southern Erie County, New York, United States.
