= Rider–Hopkins Farm and Olmsted Camp =

- U.S. National Register of Historic Places
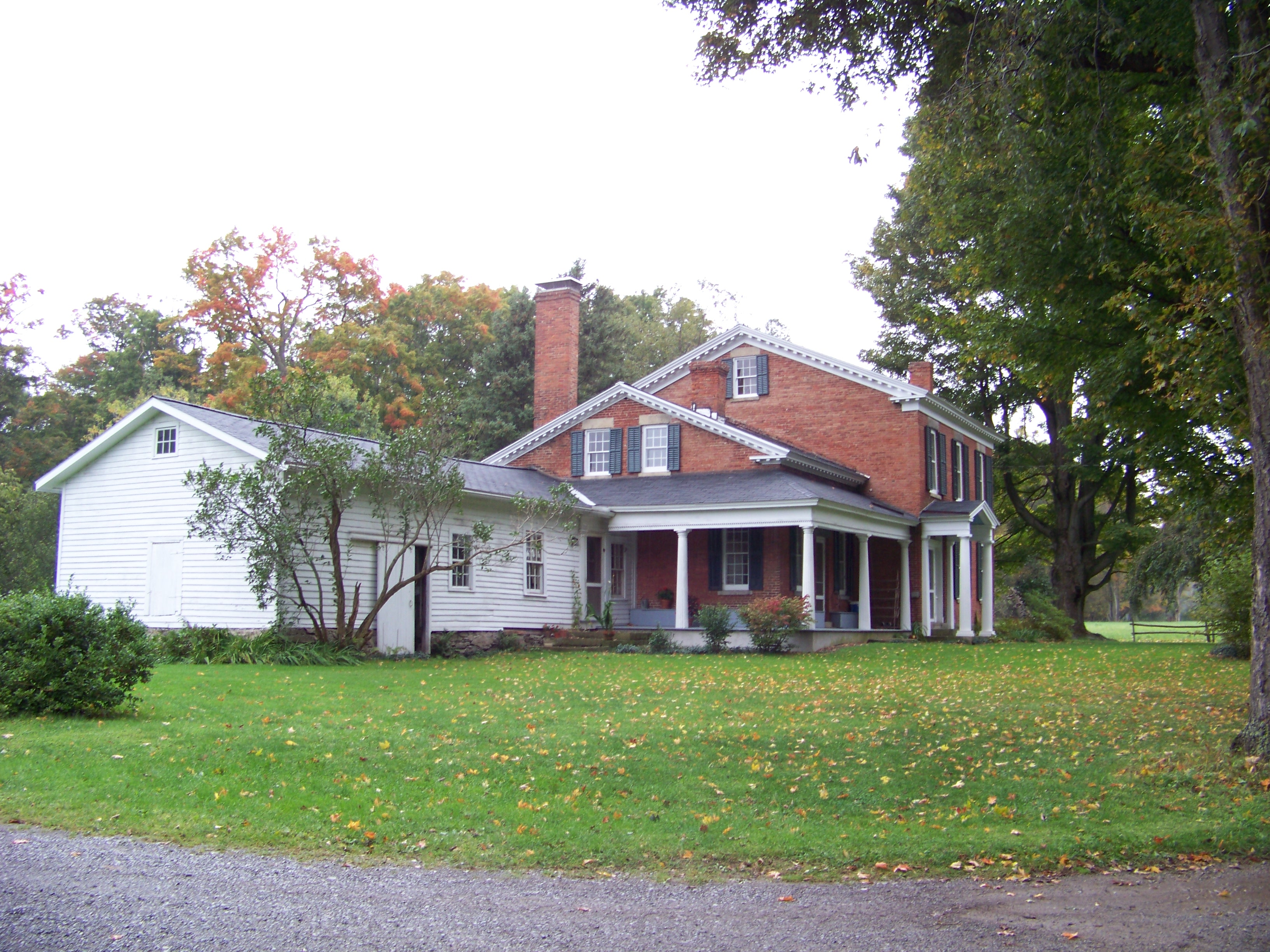
- Rider–Hopkins Farm, October 2009

- Location within New York Location within the United States
- Location: 12820 Benton Rd., Sardinia, New York
- Coordinates: 42°31′52″N 78°30′43″W
- Area: 188.4 acres (76.2 ha)
- Built: 1840
- Architect: Olmsted, Harold L.
- Architectural style: Greek Revival, Bungalow/Craftsman
- NRHP reference No.: 98001613
- Added to NRHP: January 15, 1999

Rider–Hopkins Farm and Olmsted Camp is a historic farm and summer camp located at Sardinia in Erie County, New York. It consists of a 188.4-acre (0.762 km^{2}) property containing a Greek Revival style brick farmhouse dating to the 1840s known as the James and Abigail Hopkins House. The property retains its original boundaries as purchased from the Holland Land Company in 1828. The property is also the site of the Olmsted Camp; a turn of the 20th century family summer camp in the Adirondack "Great Camp" tradition. The camp buildings are in the Arts and Crafts style and grounds are laid out in a naturalistic manner. The camp was designed by Harold LeRoy Olmsted (1886–1972); a locally prominent architect, landscape architect, and artist, who was also a distant relative of Frederick Law Olmsted.

It was listed on the National Register of Historic Places in 1999.
