= East Main–Mechanic Streets Historic District =

Historic district in New York, United States

- U.S. National Register of Historic Places
- U.S. Historic district
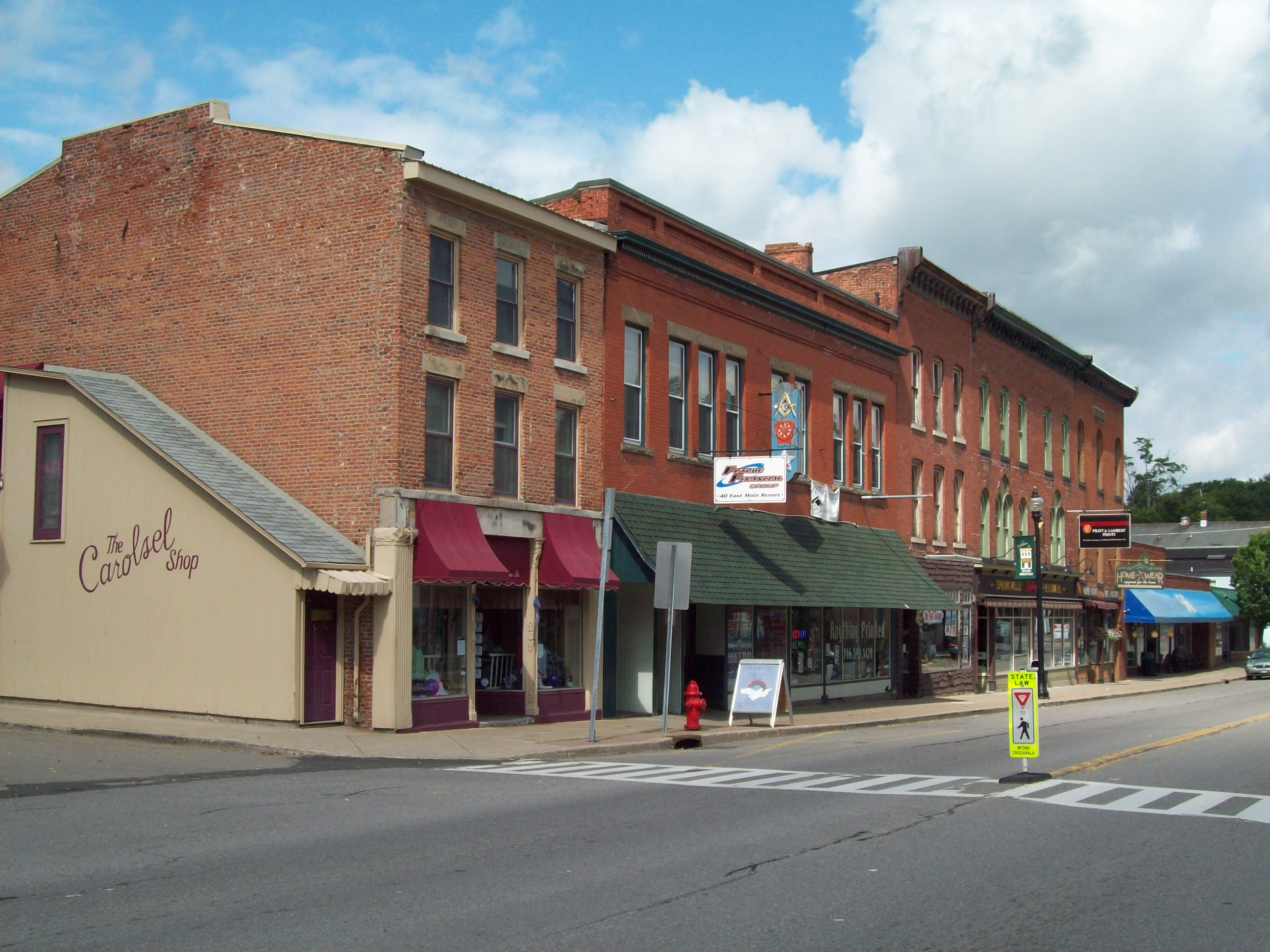
- East Main–Mechanic Streets Historic District, June 2009

- Location within New York Location within the United States
- Location: Approx. jct. of East Main and Mechanic Sts., Springville, New York
- Coordinates: 42°30′30″N 78°39′59″W
- Architectural style: Greek Revival, Italianate
- NRHP reference No.: 01001506
- Added to NRHP: January 24, 2002

East Main–Mechanic Streets Historic District is a national historic district located at Springville in Erie County, New York. It is a 5.5-acre (22,000 m^{2}) district encompassing 26 contributing structures, that primarily serve commercial functions. A number of the structures are in the Italianate style.

It was listed on the National Register of Historic Places in 2002.
