= Citizens National Bank (Springville, New York) =

Historic commercial building in New York, United States

- U.S. National Register of Historic Places
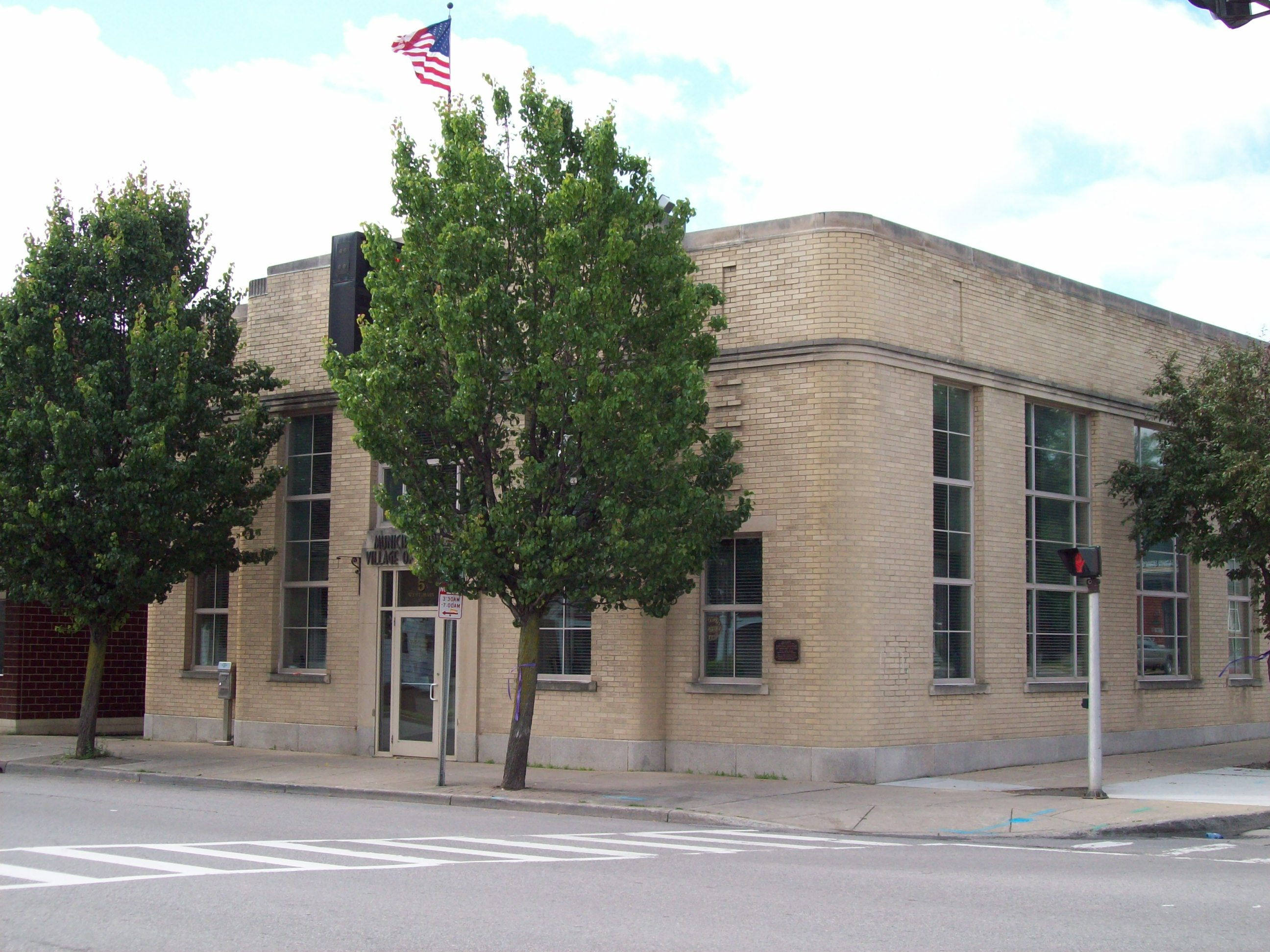
- Citizens Bank Building, Springville, NY June 2009

- Location within New York Location within the United States
- Location: 5 W. Main St., Springville, New York
- Coordinates: 42°30′32″N 78°40′4″W
- Area: 0.1 acres (0.040 ha)
- Built: 1939
- Architect: St. Louis Bank Bldg. & Equipment Co; Muse, George
- Architectural style: Moderne
- NRHP reference No.: 96000295
- Added to NRHP: April 5, 1996

Citizens National Bank is a historic bank building located at Springville, Erie County, New York. It was built in 1939, and is a two-story, five-bay, square brick building with Moderne style design elements. The interior features a mural titled "Credit Man's Confidence in Man" and painted by noted artist Louis Grell. The building housed a bank until 1968 when it was sold to the Village of Springville. The building was listed on the National Register of Historic Places in 1996. There is also a fallout shelter inside with five inch concrete walls and capabilities to hold up to 400 people for 6 months.

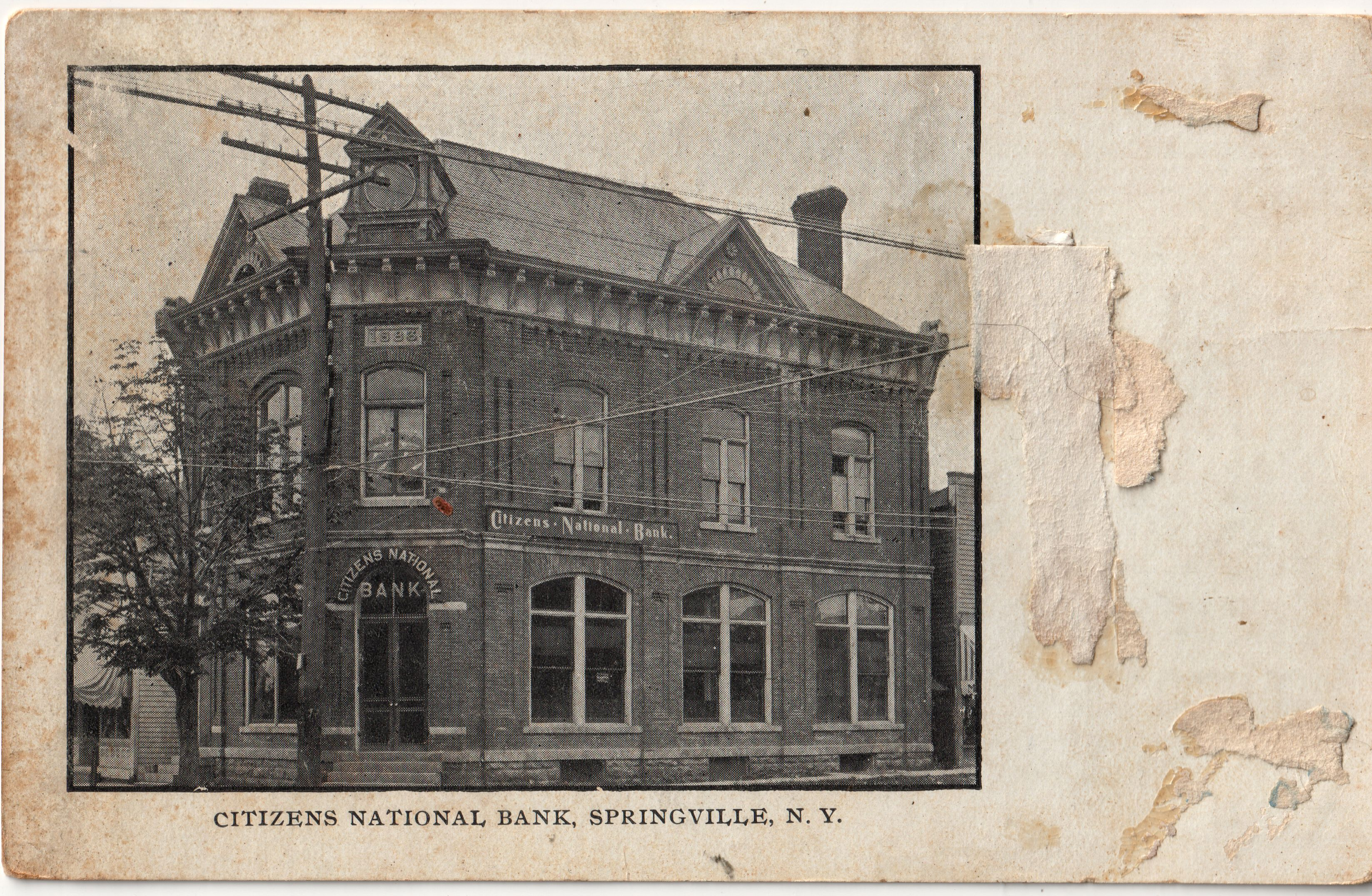
Previous building of the Citizens National Bank in the early 20h century
