= East Concord, New York =

Hamlet in New York, United States

Coordinates: 42°33′07″N 78°38′25″W

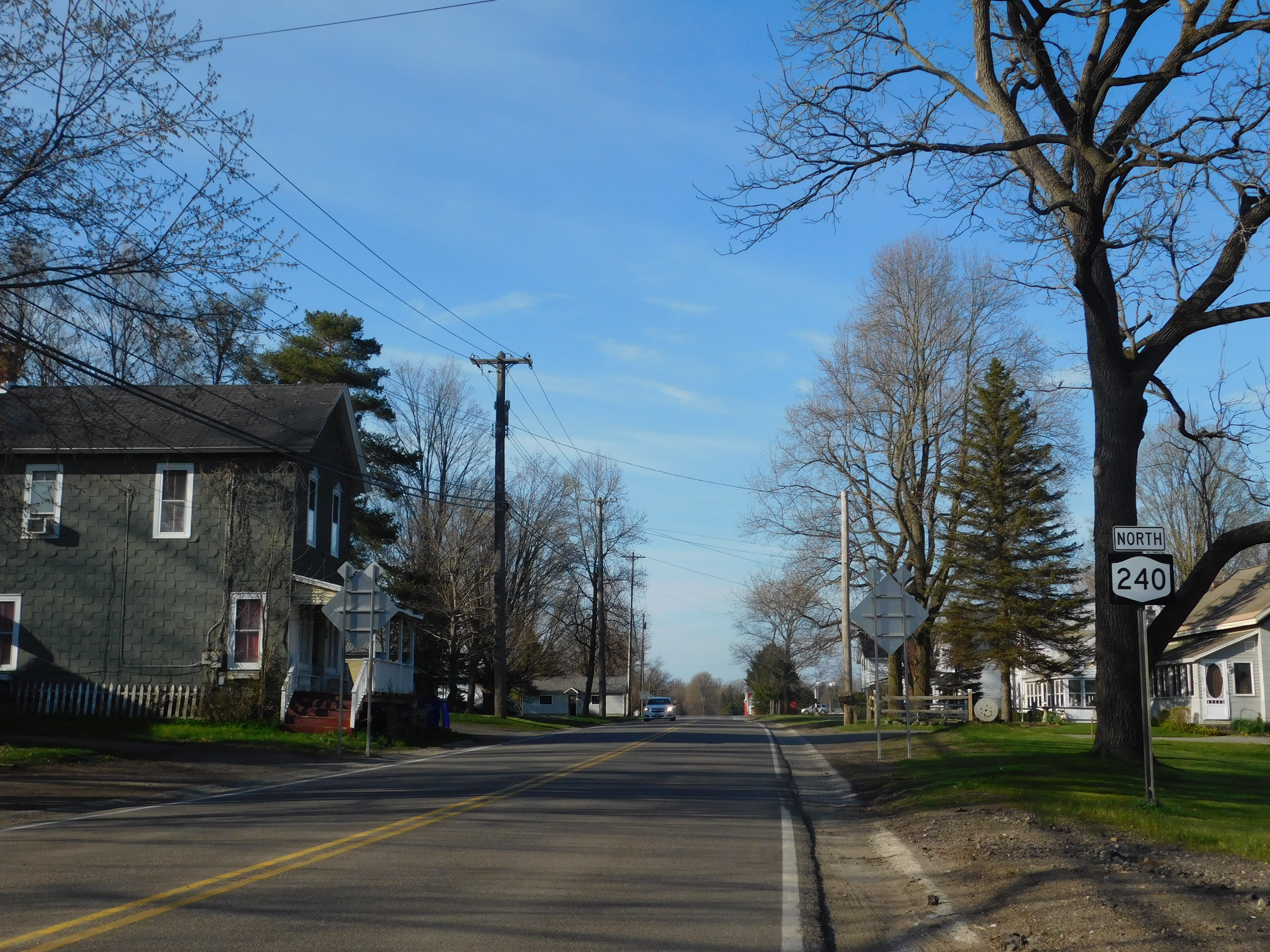
NY 240 north in East Concord

East Concord is a small hamlet in the town of Concord in southern Erie County, New York, United States. It is located at the intersection of NY Route 240 and Genesee Road.
