= Springville Center for the Arts =

Historic church in New York, United States

- The Baptist Church of Springville
- U.S. National Register of Historic Places
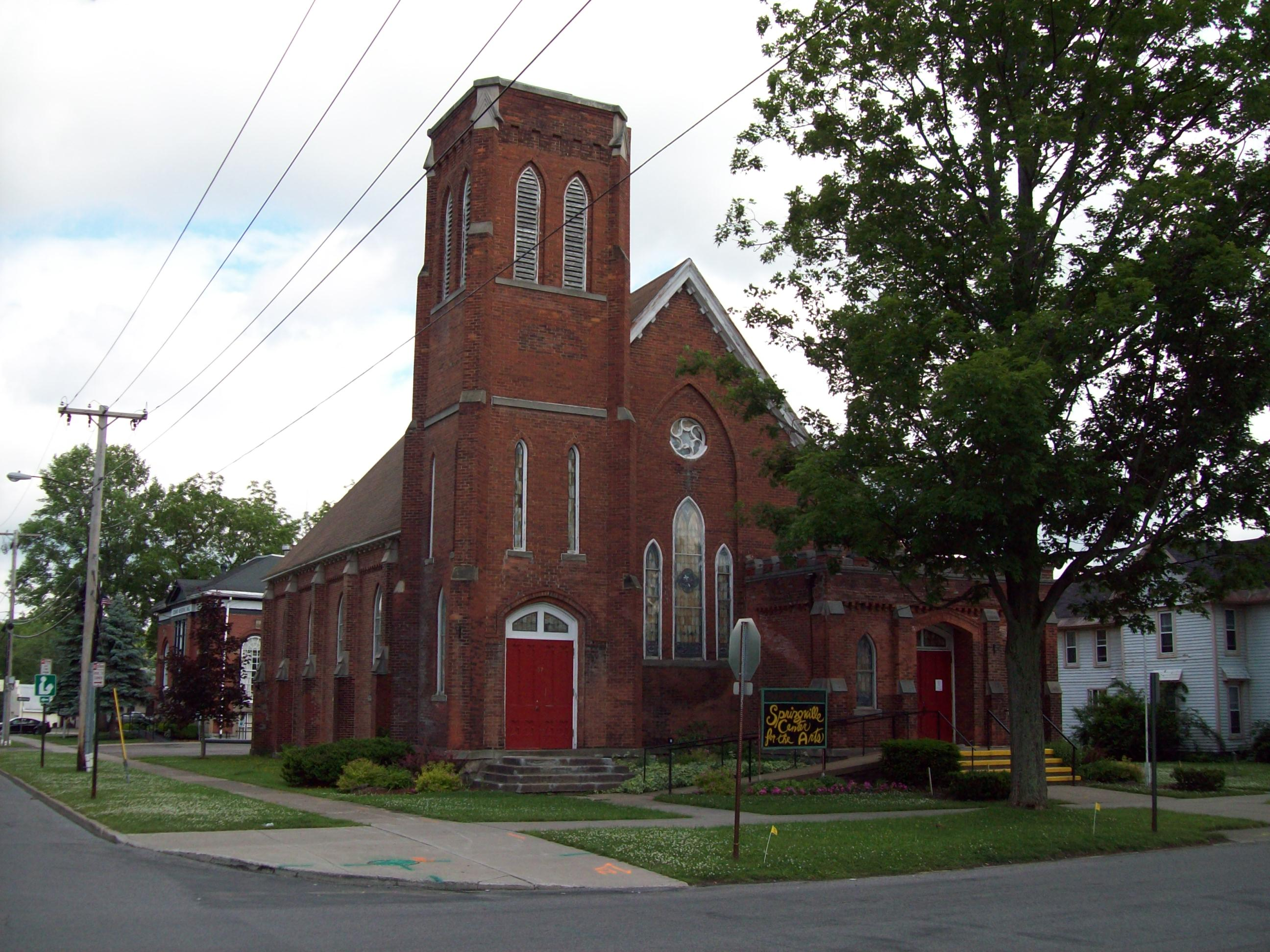
- Springville Center for the Arts, June 2009

- Location within New York Location within the United States
- Location: 37 N. Buffalo St., Springville, New York
- Coordinates: 42°30′35.14″N 78°40′1.52″W
- Area: 0.34 acres (0.14 ha)
- Built: 1869
- Architect: Porter, Cyrus K.; et al.
- Architectural style: Late Gothic Revival
- NRHP reference No.: 08001140 (original); 100001583 (increase)

Significant dates
- Added to NRHP: December 5, 2008
- Boundary increase: September 11, 2017

Springville Center for the Arts is a non-profit community multi-arts center located at Springville in Erie County, New York. It is housed in the historic The Baptist Church of Springville, a historic Baptist church. It was built in 1869, and is a red brick Late Gothic Revival-style church with limestone trim. It features a square corner bell tower.

The building was listed on the National Register of Historic Places in 2008. Nine years later, some of the additional buildings nearby that had been built for church use were added to the listing.

== History ==
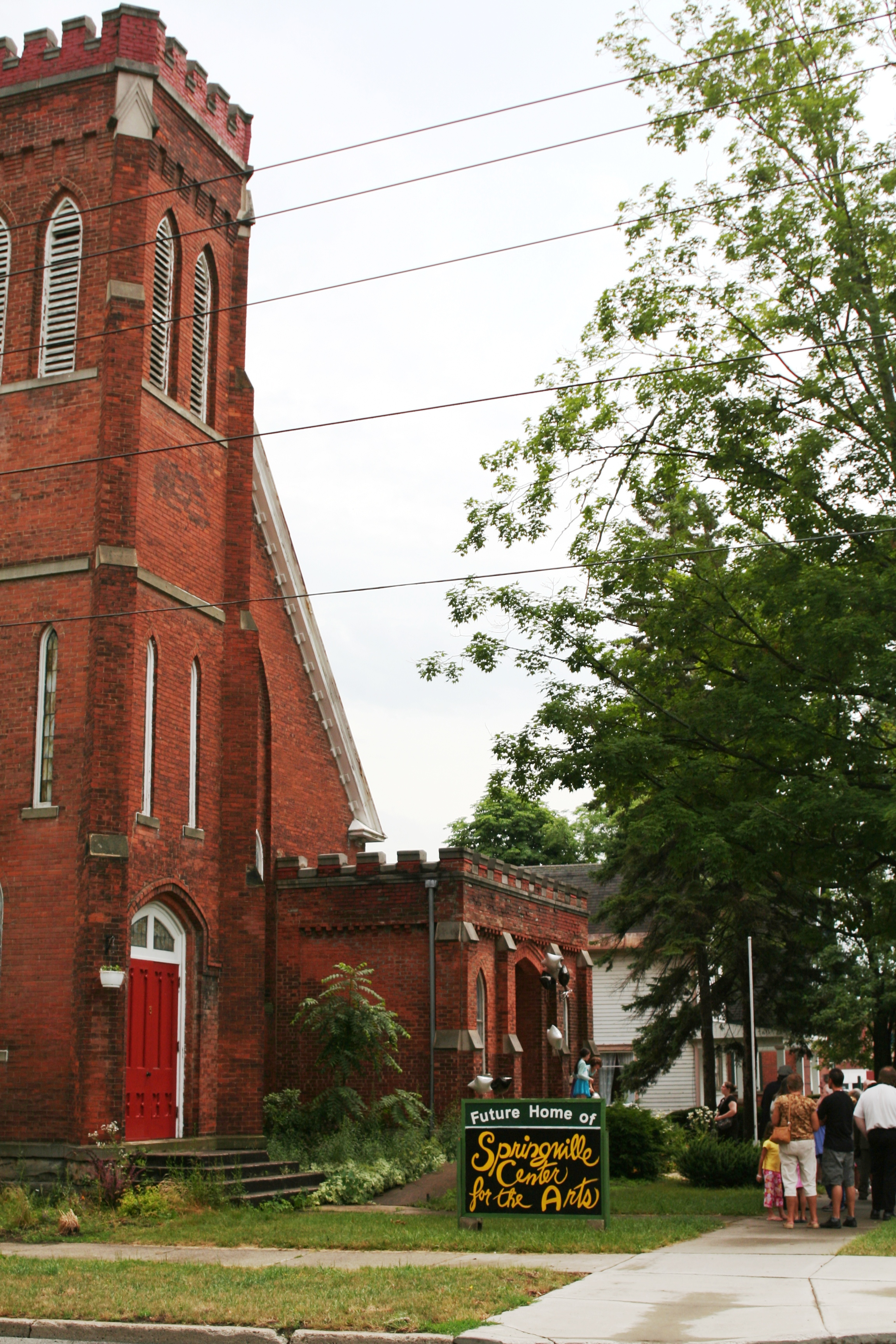
Springville Center for the Arts

Springville Center for the Arts opened in a store front location in 1998. The organization grew out of the long-standing community theater organization, the Springville Players, after a series of town hall meetings with interested artists and actors. The former Brown's Shoe Store was converted into a black box theater with adjoining gallery and reception space. Initial programming quickly expanded to include youth theater productions, a cinema program, workshops, a writers workshop and concerts.

In June 2007, the organization purchased a Baptist church dating to the 1860s. All programming is currently done at an interim setup at the site with extensive exterior restoration and interior renovations planned.

== Springville Players ==
The Springville Players began producing live community theater in the 1966 with "Mr. Roberts". For the first thirty-two years, theater events took place at the Springville Griffith High School auditorium, Bluemont, and Springville Griffith Elementary School amongst other temporary locations before moving to a rented space at 35 East Main Street. Programming typically includes one drama, comedy and a musical per season and is coordinated by a volunteer committee. Starting in 2003 with Les Mis, an additional summer youth production was added.

== Harold L. Olmsted Gallery ==
With the creation of an Arts Center in 1998, Springville Players, later Springville Center for the Arts, Inc., added a community gallery. Volunteers curated approximately twelve exhibits per year. The Harold L. Olmsted Gallery, named after a local notable architect, landscape architect and artist, was dedicated at the new facility on August 10, 2010, and continues to exhibit work by local artists.

== See also ==
- National Register of Historic Places listings in Erie County, New York
