= Old Sardinia Town Hall =

- U.S. National Register of Historic Places
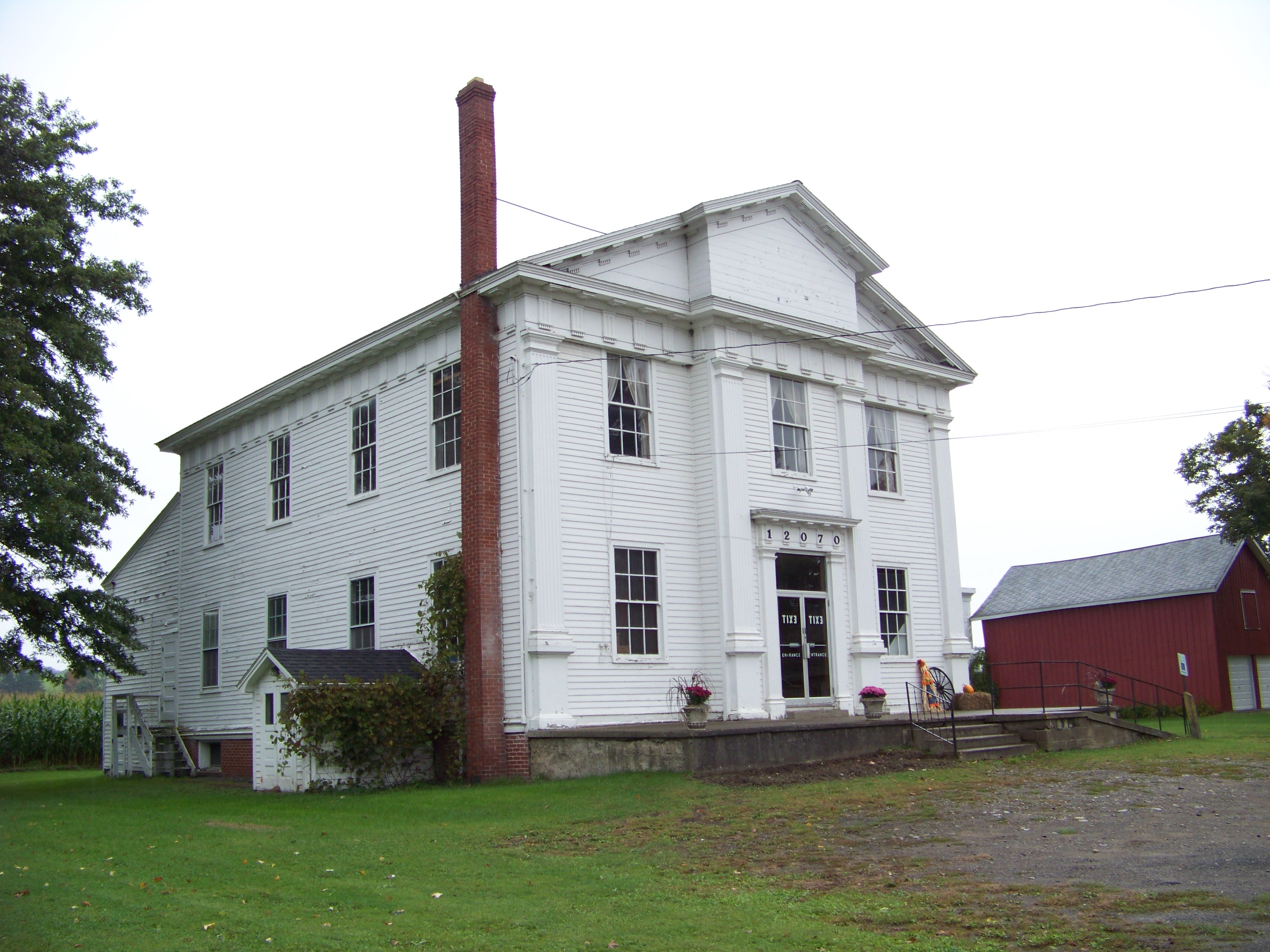
- Old Sardinia Town Hall, October 2009

- Location within New York Location within the United States
- Location: 12070 Savage Rd., Sardinia, New York
- Coordinates: 42°33′27.9318″N 78°30′13.8168″W
- Area: 1.4 acres (0.57 ha)
- Built: 1829
- Architectural style: Federal, Greek Revival
- NRHP reference No.: 08001231
- Added to NRHP: December 23, 2008

Old Sardinia Town Hall, also known as the Sardinia Meeting House and First Baptist Church of Sardinia, is a historic town hall located at Sardinia in Erie County, New York. It was built between 1828 and 1830, and is a two-story, transitional Federal / Greek Revival style frame building. It originally housed a Baptist church congregation. The building was renovated in the early-1930s and housed a local community hall until deeded to the town of Sardinia in 1945 for use as a town hall. It is now home to the Sardinia Historical Society and Museum.

It was listed on the National Register of Historic Places in 2008.
