= Erie County Fair =

Annual fair in New York

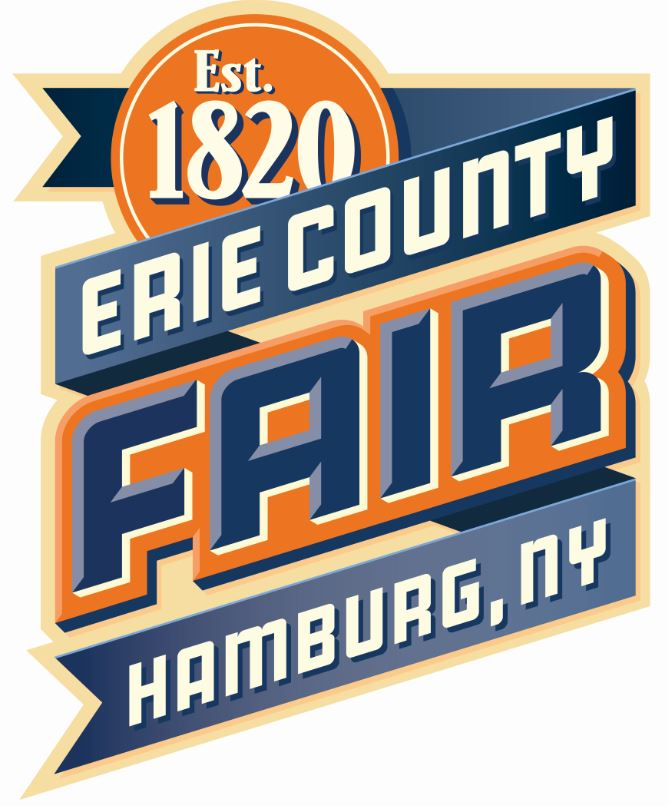
- Genre: County Fair
- Dates: 12–23 August 2026
- Location: Hamburg, New York
- Years active: 185
- Website: www.ecfair.org

The Erie County Fair is a fair held in Hamburg in Erie County, New York, every August. Based on 2018 attendance statistics, the Erie County Fair is the largest county fair in New York, the 3rd largest county fair in the United States, and the largest east of the Mississippi River. The fair often draws over one million people in attendance.

The Town of Hamburg Police & the Erie County (NY) Sheriff's Office, besides security guards, are the fair's patrollers.

== History ==
=== 1820 to 1867 ===
The Erie County Agricultural Society is a private, not for profit membership corporation established in 1819, then called the Niagara County Horticultural Society. It held its first fair in 1820 on what is now the site of the Donovan Office Building in Buffalo. One year later, Niagara County split into Erie and Niagara Counties, and so did the agricultural society. The Erie County Agricultural Society is the oldest civic, community member organization in Erie County. The only time in the history of the fair where the event was not held was 1943 during World War II due to rationing of supplies for the war effort. The fair was briefly renamed America's Fair during the early to mid-2000s in an effort to expand the fair beyond Erie County; it has since been renamed the Erie County Fair.

The region's first agricultural society was founded in 1819 with the goal of sponsoring a county fair to promote education and competition among farmers. This goal was realized when the first fairs were held on the Buffalo waterfront in 1820 and 1821. Dr. Cyrenius Chapin, one of Buffalo's most active energetic pioneers was elected President for the fledgling organization. The location was near Terrace and Main Streets, the current site of One Canalside (2014). Enthusiasm for the annual "Farmer’s Holiday" was shortcut when local farmers lost interest due to poor travel conditions, a downturn in the economy and the community's collective focus on the building of the Erie Canal. With the opening of the Canal in 1825, the Village of Buffalo quickly grew in size and economic stature becoming a city in 1832. After not holding a fair from 1822 through 1840, The Erie County Agricultural Society was re-activated in 1841 and sponsored a Fair held at Lafayette Square on the grounds of the Erie County Court House. So earnest were their endeavors that only once since 1841 has a year passed without a Fair. In 1943 the Fair was postponed due to World War II rationing of gasoline and other vital commodities.

The Fair would be held within the Buffalo city-limits until 1849 at which time urban expansion facilitated a move to a country location for the Fair. 1850 marked the first year that the Fair was held outside of the City of Buffalo making its debut in the Village of Aurora. Lancaster hosted the Fair September 9 and 10, 1851. Fairgoers were able to take specially scheduled trains for a fare of .25 cents from Buffalo at 9:30a & 12:30a and returning from Lancaster at 1p and 5p. 1852 saw the Fair held in East Hamburgh, now Orchard Park. The 1853 Fair was held on the enclosed grounds at Cold Spring October 7 & 8. The Fair returned to Aurora in 1854 and 1855.

The year 1855 was distinguished by two important circumstances in the history of the Ag society. First it was then for the first time, that admission fee of 12 1/2 cents was imposed. Secondly, it was the year that famed newspaper editor and once candidate for President Horace Greeley spoke as a main attraction. Greeley is noted for his famous admonition, "Go west, young man, go west!" His speech at the Fair was a practical talk – on drainage, the use of tile and the canning of fruit which was just coming into vogue. An act of the State Legislature in April 1855 provided for the more thorough organization of Agricultural Societies. At a meeting of the Society, the group was technically dissolved and immediately reorganized under the act.

The Agricultural Society leased, for the term of ten years, a lot near the Indian Church which is now called Indian Church Road in South Buffalo near West Seneca and held its fair on September 26-26, 1856. In 1862, the minutes speak of holding the fair on the Society's grounds near Whitmore's tavern. As no record of a change of location can be found, this must refer to the grounds near the Indian Church. But in 1863 the site was evidently change and a committee was appointed to locate a site nearer the city on the premise that it would then be to the Society's interests and more acceptable to the citizens of Buffalo. In 1865, under the direction of Hiram White, the fair was held on the half-mile track at Cold Springs.

At a meeting held in September 1865 a resolution was passed to hold the fair in the town fitting up the necessary grounds and offering the best pecuniary inducements. At the annual meeting on January 10, 1866, an informal ballot upon the location of the next fair was taken. Springville received 38 and Aurora 13 votes, in consequence of which the fair that year was held at Springville on the grounds of the Union Agricultural Society. The Fair's nomadic ways would soon end as after the 1867 Springville Fair, the Agricultural Society would receive an offer that would change its history forever.

=== 1867 to present ===
On January 9, 1868, Luther Titus of Hamburg went to the annual meeting at Springville and offered on behalf of the Hamburg Driving Park Association the use of its new half-mile track and grounds with office buildings and seats, free of charge for holding the next annual fair. By a vote of 18 to 17, the Fair moved to Hamburg and held its first exposition in 1868.

In the year 1881, the society purchased it first acres of land from Maria and Naomi Clark and George M. Pierce which is the present site of the Society's ground and the original site of the Hamburg Driving Park Association. Now with its own land, the Society began to develop the property into its permanent home.

The Erie County Agricultural Society held annual Fairs from 1841 through 1855. In 1856, the original Society was reorganized under a State legislative act and the Fair held in 1856 was again given the number "one." In 1937, the Board of Managers took action to incorporate the first 15 fairs plus one fair added to the count that was held in conjunction with the New York State Fair in 1856. In 1937, the 97th Fair was held. No fair was held in 1943 due to WWII. In 1963, after the pioneer fairs of 1820 & 1821 were fully documented, their numbers were to the official numbering system making the 1964 fair the 125th.

In 2014, the Erie County Agricultural Society held its 175th edition of the Fair. The Fair was highlighted by a high-wire walk over the Fairgrounds by Nik Wallenda, who crossed Niagara Falls on a tightrope two years prior.

On July 20, 2017, a tornado ripped through the Hamburg fairgrounds, shattering dozens of car windows, blowing tree branches and blowing a park bench onto a building. Damage to the fairgrounds was estimated at US 1.2 million. Repairs to the fairgrounds were completed in time and the 2017 fair was held as scheduled.

In 2017, the fair celebrated 30 years of the “Giant Wheel” Ferris wheel, which is part of the Strates Shows traveling midway. The Giant Wheel continues to serve as a main icon of the fair, towering over the Strates Shows midway annually.

On August 19, 2018, the attendance for the 179th Erie County Fair was just shy of 1.2 million visitors. This is the second highest attendance in fair history, behind the 2014 fair.

On August 18, 2019, the attendance for the 180th Erie County Fair set the all time attendance record at 1,238,456 visitors which broke the previous record set back in 2014. The 180th Erie County Fair showed no signs of slowing down for future years, as attendance was up nearly 18,000 more visitors from the previous year of the fair. The 2019 fair featured new rides to commemorate the 95th anniversary with midway provider Strates Shows. The show featured new rides such as, the Frisbee, the Crazy Mouse roller coaster, and the legendary Sky Wheel which the show hasn’t featured in over 20 years.

The 181st Erie County Fair was originally set to run August 12–23, 2020, but postponed as a result of the COVID-19 pandemic. The 181st fair was held the following year from August 11-22, 2021. The postponement of the 2020 Erie County Fair marks only the second time since 1841 that the fair has been cancelled. During World War II, the 1943 Fair was cancelled to support the patriotic rationing of gasoline and other vital wartime commodities. The fair returned the following year to record breaking attendance.

== Erie County Fairgrounds ==
The Erie County Fairgrounds is a fair, horse racing, and convention complex located in the town of Hamburg, New York, United States. It has hosted the annual Erie County Fair since 1868.

=== Locations ===
1820–1821	Buffalo (Main/Terrace; current site of Canalside One)
1841	Buffalo (Court House Grounds/Lafayette Square)
1842–1849	Buffalo (Ebenezer Johnson Property/Delaware Ave)
1850	Aurora
1851	Lancaster
1852	East Hamburgh (Orchard Park)
1853	Cold Springs
1854	Aurora
1855	East Hamburgh (Orchard Park)
1856–1864	South Buffalo/West Seneca (Indian Church Road)
1865	Buffalo (Cold Springs)
1866	Springville (Dygert Farm)
1867	Springville (Union Fairgrounds)
1868–Present	Hamburg (Current site)
