= Wānaka (disambiguation) =

Wānaka is a summer resort town in New Zealand.

Wanaka or Wanakah may also refer to:

- Wanaka, Mycenaean Greek for Anax
- Wanaka AFC, New Zealand association football team
- Wanakah, New York, a hamlet of New York state
- Lake Wānaka, New Zealand
- Outer Wanaka, New Zealand statistical area
