= John Stone (captain) =

American farmer and landowner who became a captain in the militia

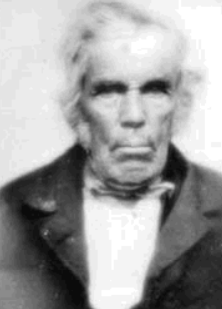
- Stone, pictured in the first half of the 19th century
- Born: February 26, 1779; Windom, New York, U.S.
- Died: December 11, 1858 (aged 79); Ashland, Massachusetts, U.S.
- Resting place: Wildwood Cemetery, Ashland, Massachusetts, U.S.
- Occupation(s): Farmer, landowner, militia captain
- Spouse: Nancy Stimpson
- Parent(s): Abijah Stone; Experience Stimson

John Stone (February 26, 1779 – December 11, 1858) was an American farmer and landowner who became a captain in the militia.

== Life and career ==
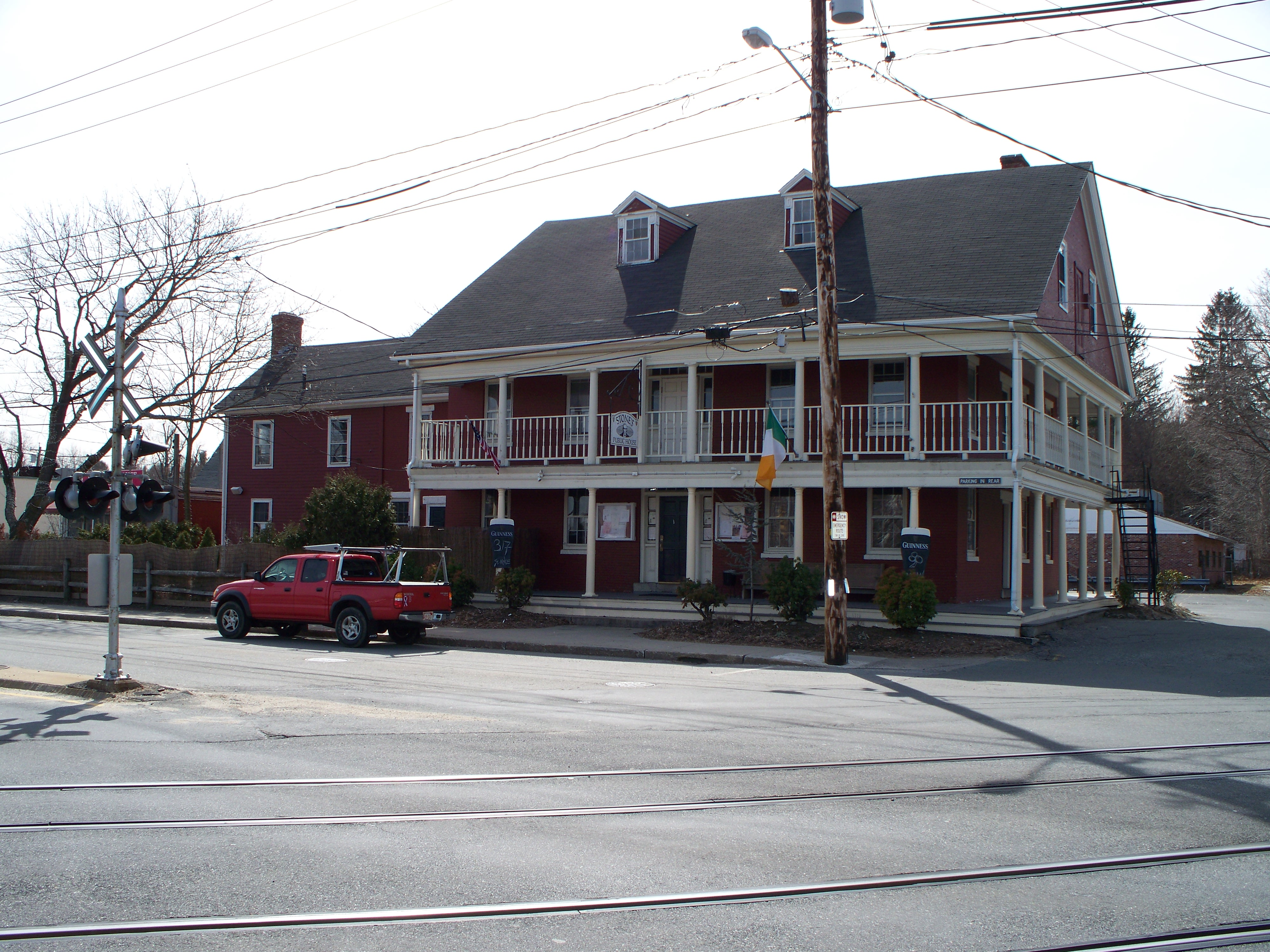
Stone's Public House in 2009

Stone was born on February 26, 1779, in Windom, New York, to Abijah Stone and Experience Stimson. Abijah's father, Daniel, was born in Saxonville, Massachusetts, but was raised by Micah Stone, a relative who lived in Framingham, after his father died less than a year after John was born. Abijah moved to Hopkinton, then Hubbardston and, finally Windom.

Stone left New York and returned to Hopkinton, where he married Nancy Stimpson, the daughter of local physician Jeremy Stimpson. She was also the granddaughter of colonel John Jones Jr.

The Stones had seven children at their Union Street home. John was a farmer but served in the militia, rising to the rank of captain. He also owned a large tract of land in Unionville, Massachusetts (today's Ashland).

The Boston and Worcester Railroad was in its early stages and, knowing it was due to pass through his property, Stone built a hotel (Railroad House) next to the tracks at today's 179 Main Street. The railroad was dedicated, in a ceremony held at the hotel, on September 20, 1834.

Stone owned the hotel for less than two years. He transferred the business to his son, Napoleon. Napoleon gifted land to the town in 1907 which led to the creation of Stone Park, on Park Road.

In 1852, Stone deeded the Simpson–Jones family burial ground (known as the Revolutionary or Old Burying Ground) on Union Street to the town.

The property, now a pub, is called Stone's Public House today (changed from John Stone's Inn, which was its name between 1976 and the 1990s).

=== Death ===
Stone died on December 11, 1858, aged 79. He is interred in Ashland's Wildwood Cemetery, alongside his wife, who predeceased him by five years.
