= Water Valley =

Water Valley may refer to a place in North America:

Canada

- Water Valley, Alberta

United States

- Water Valley, Kentucky
- Water Valley, Mississippi
- Water Valley, New York
- Water Valley, Texas
