= Loveland, New York =

Hamlet in New York, United States

Coordinates: 42°44′00″N 78°41′56″W

Loveland is a hamlet in the town of Orchard Park in Erie County, New York, United States.
