= Windom, New York =

Hamlet in New York, United States

Coordinates: 42°47′07″N 78°47′23″W

Windom is a hamlet in the towns of Hamburg and Orchard Park in Erie County, New York, United States.
