= Ellicott, Erie County, New York =

Hamlet in New York, United States

Coordinates: 42°44′04″N 78°43′53″W

Ellicott is a hamlet in the town of Orchard Park in Erie County, New York, United States.
