= Akron Falls Park =

Park in New York, United States

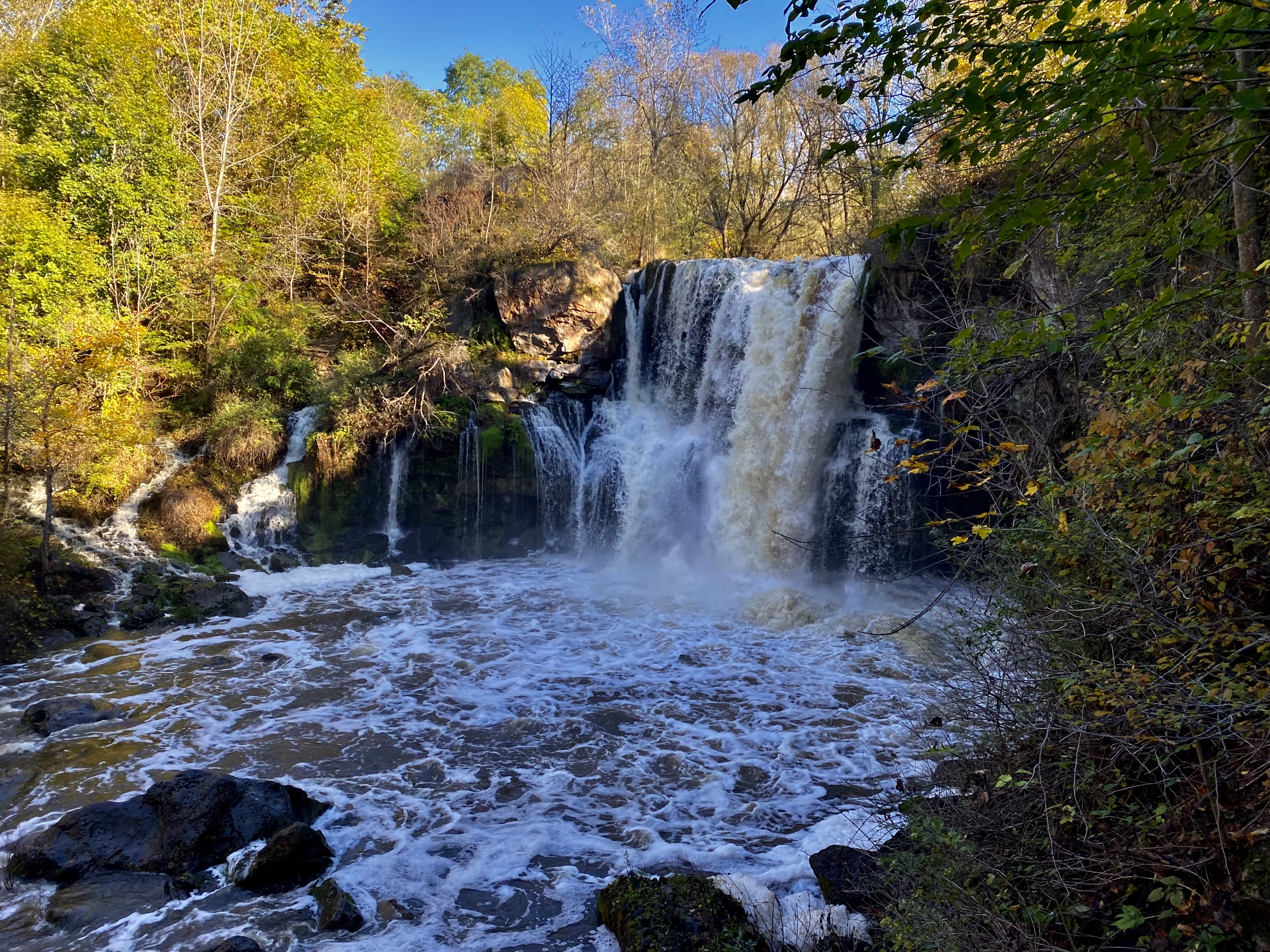
- View of Akron Falls in October 2021.

- Location within New York
- Interactive map of Akron Falls Park
- Type: Regional park
- Location: 44 Parkview Drive; Akron, New York
- Nearest city: Buffalo
- Coordinates: 43°00′59″N 78°29′43″W
- Area: 284 acres (1.15 km^{2})
- Created: 1933
- Operator: Erie County Department of Parks, Recreation and Forestry
- Open: All Year
- Website: Akron Falls Park webpage

Akron Falls Park is a 284-acre (1.15 km^{2}) park in the Village of Akron and Town of Newstead, New York. A major feature of the park is a scenic 40-foot (12 m) waterfall on Murder Creek, a small stream that flows through the park. The park is operated by the Erie County Department of Parks, Recreation and Forestry, and is free and open year-round.

== History ==
The park's core was originally managed by the Village of Akron in the early 1930s. In 1933, approximately 90 workers from the Civil Works Administration labored to improve the park. The park was transferred to Erie County in 1947, making it one of the county's oldest parks. In the years that followed, the county purchased adjacent property, which would eventually house the park's picnic shelters and ice skating facilities.

== Park facilities ==
The park has facilities for soccer, baseball, softball and tennis. Several shelters are located within the park and may be reserved for events and gatherings. Trails for hiking and bicycling are found throughout the property. During the winter, the park features ice skating facilities, a sledding hill and cross-country skiing trails. Electric vehicle (EV) chargers have been installed in the park.
