= Duells Corner, New York =

Hamlet in New York, United States

Coordinates: 42°44′49″N 78°44′54″W

Duells Corners (also spelled Deuels Corners or Dewells Corners) is a hamlet in the town of Orchard Park in Erie County, New York, United States.
