= Pinehurst, New York =

Hamlet in New York, United States

Coordinates: 42°43′56″N 78°56′06″W

Pinehurst is a hamlet in the town of Hamburg in Erie County, New York, United States.
