= Webster Corners, New York =

Hamlet in New York, United States

Coordinates: 42°46′54″N 78°44′45″W

Webster Corners is a hamlet in the town of Orchard Park in Erie County, New York, United States.
