= Akron, New York =

Akron Seneca: Heyó:ögëh
- Village
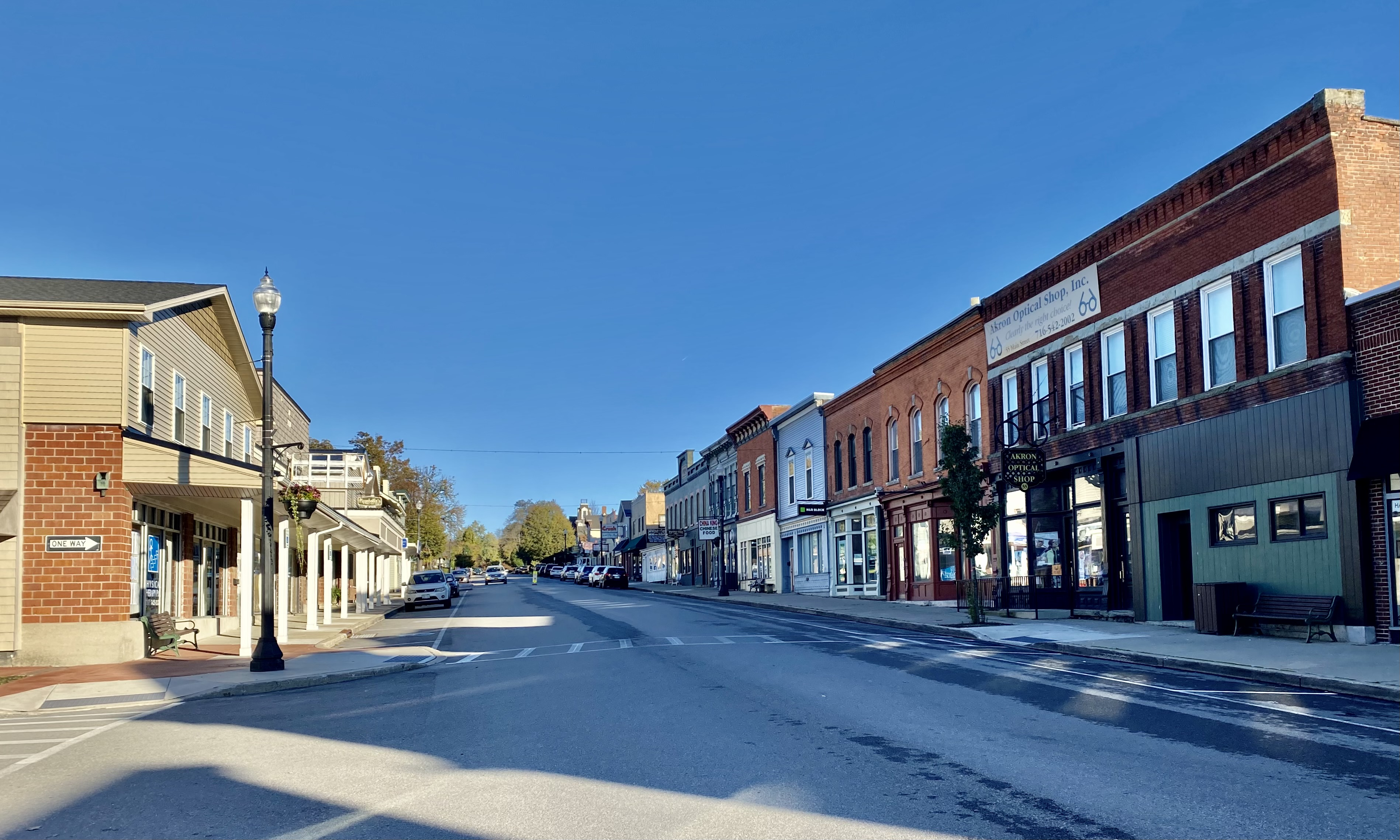
- Main Street

- Seal

- Location in Erie County and the state of New York
- Coordinates: 43°1′10″N 78°29′41″W
- Country: United States
- State: New York
- County: Erie
- Town: Newstead

Area
  - Total: 2.01 sq mi (5.21 km^{2})
  - Land: 2.01 sq mi (5.21 km^{2})
  - Water: 0 sq mi (0.00 km^{2})
- Elevation: 741 ft (226 m)

Population (2020)
  - Total: 2,888
  - Density: 1,435.7/sq mi (554.34/km^{2})
- Time zone: UTC-5 (Eastern (EST))
  - Summer (DST): UTC-4 (EDT)
- ZIP code: 14001
- Area code: 716
- FIPS code: 36-00441
- GNIS feature ID: 0942224
- Website: Village of Akron official website

Akron (Seneca: Heyó:ögëh) is a village in Erie County, New York, United States. As of the 2020 census, Akron had a population of 2,888. The name derives from the Greek word ἄκρον signifying a summit or high point. It is part of the Buffalo-Niagara Falls metropolitan area. Akron is located in the town of Newstead on the west and north slopes of a hill. NY 93 passes through the village.

== History ==
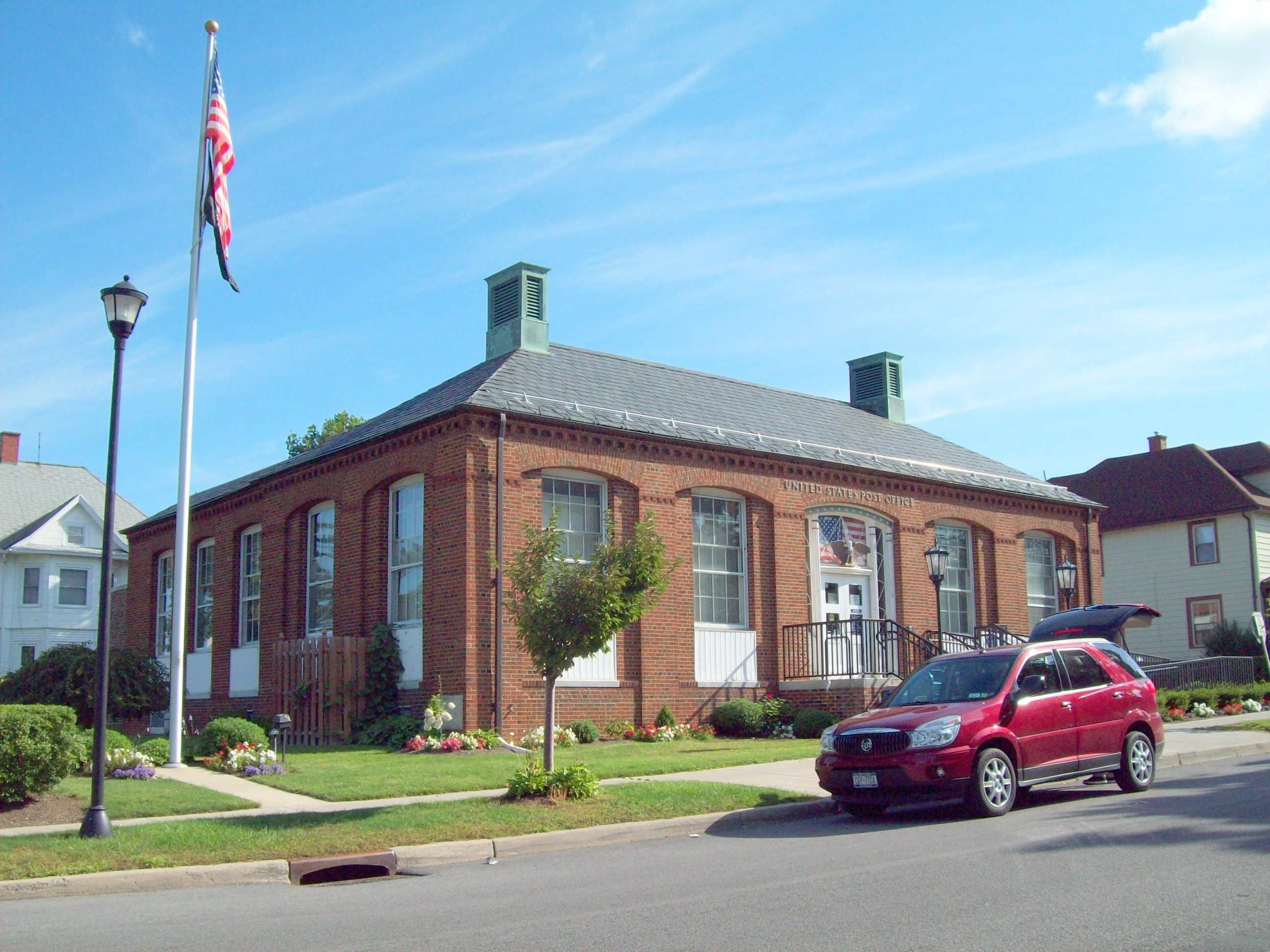
The post office in Akron is listed on the National Register of Historic Places.

The village was developed after land was purchased from local Native Americans. The site of the village was first settled circa 1829, centered on Akron Falls, which provided water power. Akron became an incorporated village in 1849. The village absorbed the community of Fallkirk in its growth. In 1880, the population of Akron was about 1,050. It was then an important cement-producing center, due to local deposits of gypsum. Besides production of cement, the village also produced cigars.

=== Notable people ===
- Dick Beyer – American professional wrestler (1930–2019)
- Dennis E. Nolan – United States Army general (1872–1956)

== Geography ==
Akron is located at 43°1′10″N 78°29′41″W (43.019309, -78.494644). The village is northeast of Buffalo.

According to the United States Census Bureau, the village has a total area of 2.0 square miles (5.2 km^{2}), all land.

Akron is adjacent to the Tonawanda Reservation of the Seneca, but most of the reservation is in Genesee County. A small general aviation airport, Akron Airport, is on high ground on the eastern side of the village. Much of Akron Falls County Park is within the village. The falls are a feature of Murder Creek, which passes through the park and the village flowing in a northwesterly direction.

== Demographics ==
Historical population
Census	Pop.	Note	%±
1860	462		—
1870	444		−3.9%
1880	1,036		133.3%
1890	1,492		44.0%
1900	1,585		6.2%
1910	1,677		5.8%
1920	1,960		16.9%
1930	2,188		11.6%
1940	2,263		3.4%
1950	2,481		9.6%
1960	2,841		14.5%
1970	2,863		0.8%
1980	2,971		3.8%
1990	2,906		−2.2%
2000	3,085		6.2%
2010	2,868		−7.0%
2020	2,888		0.7%
U.S. Decennial Census

=== 2020 census ===
As of the 2020 census, Akron had a population of 2,888. The median age was 44.1 years. 21.2% of residents were under the age of 18 and 20.6% of residents were 65 years of age or older. For every 100 females there were 89.0 males, and for every 100 females age 18 and over there were 86.8 males age 18 and over.

0.0% of residents lived in urban areas, while 100.0% lived in rural areas.

There were 1,354 households in Akron, of which 24.7% had children under the age of 18 living in them. Of all households, 39.0% were married-couple households, 20.2% were households with a male householder and no spouse or partner present, and 33.4% were households with a female householder and no spouse or partner present. About 38.4% of all households were made up of individuals and 18.4% had someone living alone who was 65 years of age or older.

There were 1,451 housing units, of which 6.7% were vacant. The homeowner vacancy rate was 0.7% and the rental vacancy rate was 3.8%.

Racial composition as of the 2020 census
Race	Number	Percent
White	2,661	92.1%
Black or African American	27	0.9%
American Indian and Alaska Native	63	2.2%
Asian	11	0.4%
Native Hawaiian and Other Pacific Islander	0	0.0%
Some other race	5	0.2%
Two or more races	121	4.2%
Hispanic or Latino (of any race)	32	1.1%

=== 2000 census ===
As of the census of 2000, there were 3,085 people, 1,313 households, and 839 families residing in the village. The population density was 1,571.3 inhabitants per square mile (606.7/km^{2}). There were 1,373 housing units at an average density of 699.3 per square mile (270.0/km^{2}). The racial makeup of the village was 97.57% White, 0.39% African American, 1.39% Native American, 0.03% Asian, 0.13% from other races, and 0.49% from two or more races. Hispanic or Latino of any race were 0.65% of the population.

There were 1,313 households, out of which 28.8% had children under the age of 18 living with them, 48.8% were married couples living together, 11.1% had a female householder with no husband present, and 36.1% were non-families. 31.3% of all households were made up of individuals, and 18.1% had someone living alone who was 65 years of age or older. The average household size was 2.34 and the average family size was 2.94.

In the village, the population was spread out, with 23.7% under the age of 18, 7.6% from 18 to 24, 27.4% from 25 to 44, 22.9% from 45 to 64, and 18.4% who were 65 years of age or older. The median age was 39 years. For every 100 females, there were 87.4 males. For every 100 females age 18 and over, there were 82.9 males.

The median income for a household in the village was $35,313, and the median income for a family was $48,083. Males had a median income of $33,250 versus $24,327 for females. The per capita income for the village was $17,712. About 4.9% of families and 8.2% of the population were below the poverty line, including 7.0% of those under age 18 and 8.8% of those age 65 or over.

== Attractions ==
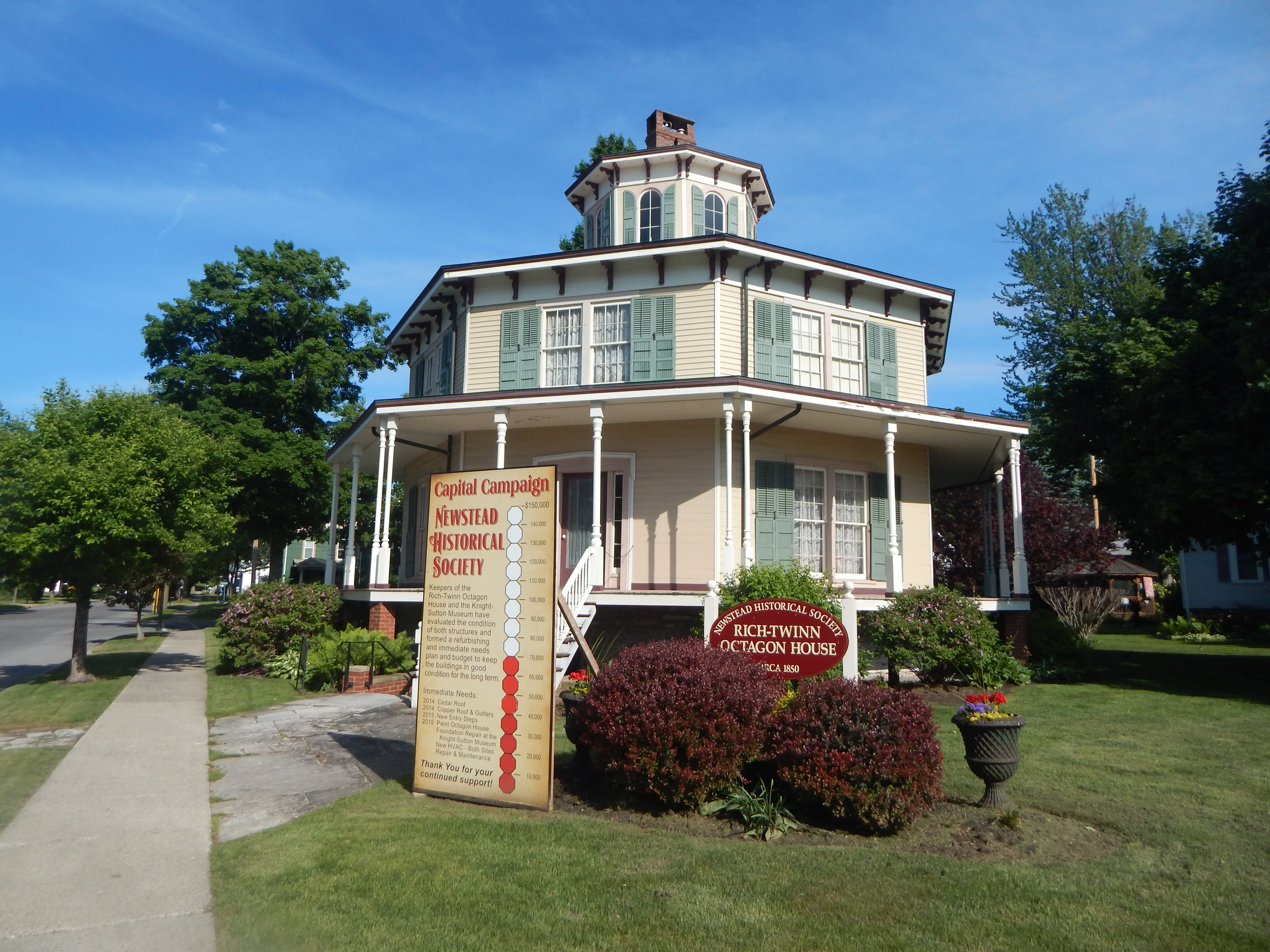
Rich-Twinn House in June 2015, during restoration

- The Rich-Twinn Octagon House, an example of this unusual style of architecture, is open to the public. The Newstead Historical Society also operates the Knight-Sutton Museum with exhibits of local history and culture.
- A popular spot for social gathering in Akron is Russell Park, which was put in an Akron's founder's will to be a park forever or returned to his next of kin. At one point in time, where the gazebo is now, there used to be a fountain. Due to the cost of upkeep, the fountain was removed and replaced with the Akron gazebo.
- Akron is home to one school, Akron Central School, which includes all students, pre-K to 12 in its one building.
- U.S. Post Office (Akron, New York), a historic post office building, contains a WPA tempera mural, Early Mail Route to Akron, completed in 1941 by artist Elizabeth Logan.
- Akron Fire Company serves the Village of Akron, and parts of the Town of Newstead in conjunction with the Newstead Fire Company.
- The first park golf course in the United States was opened in Akron in July 2013. The sport, brought to America by Akron native Dick "The Destroyer" Beyer, originated in Japan, where Beyer spent several years as a professional wrestler.
