= Erie County, New York =

County in New York, United States

- County
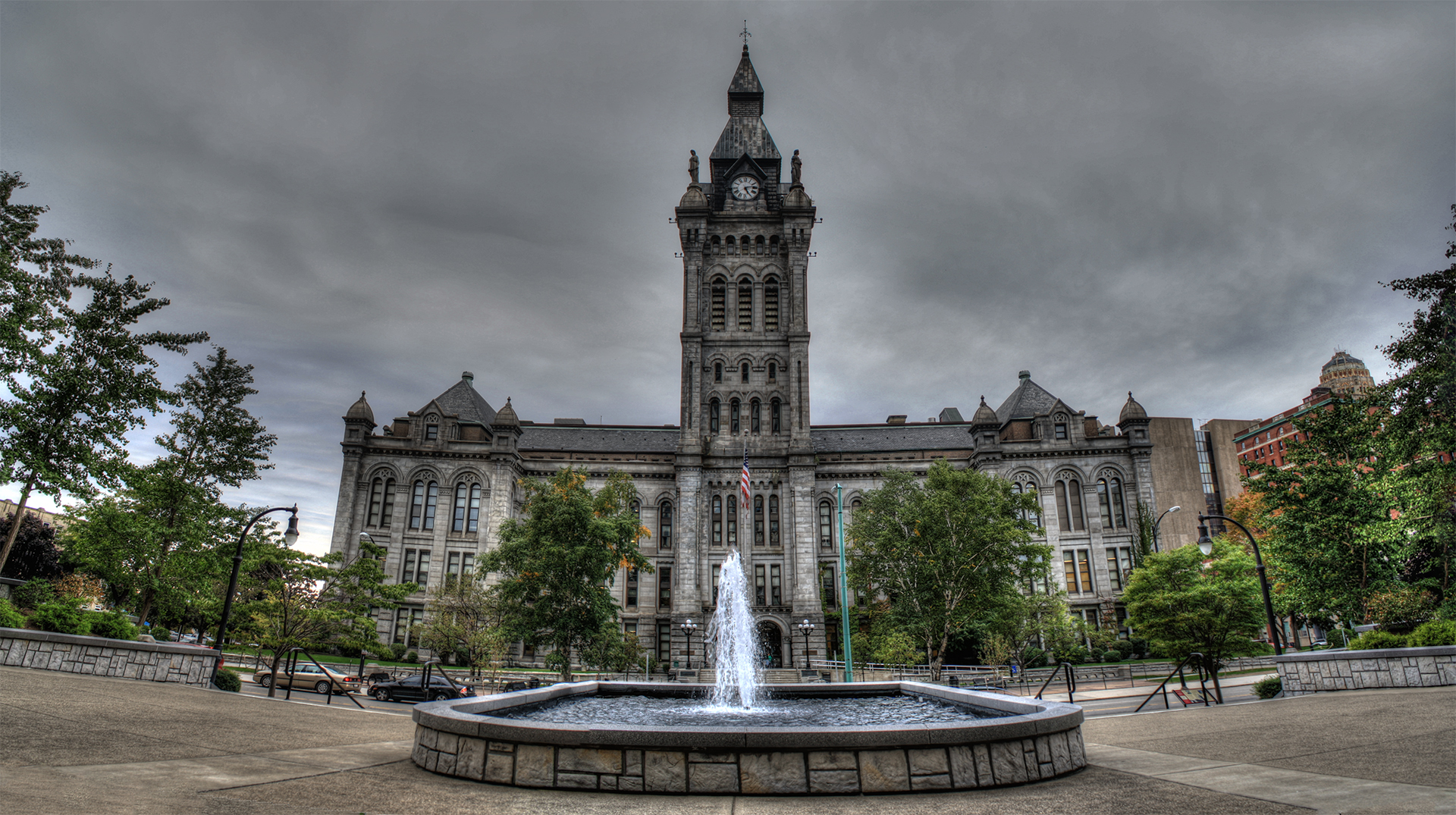
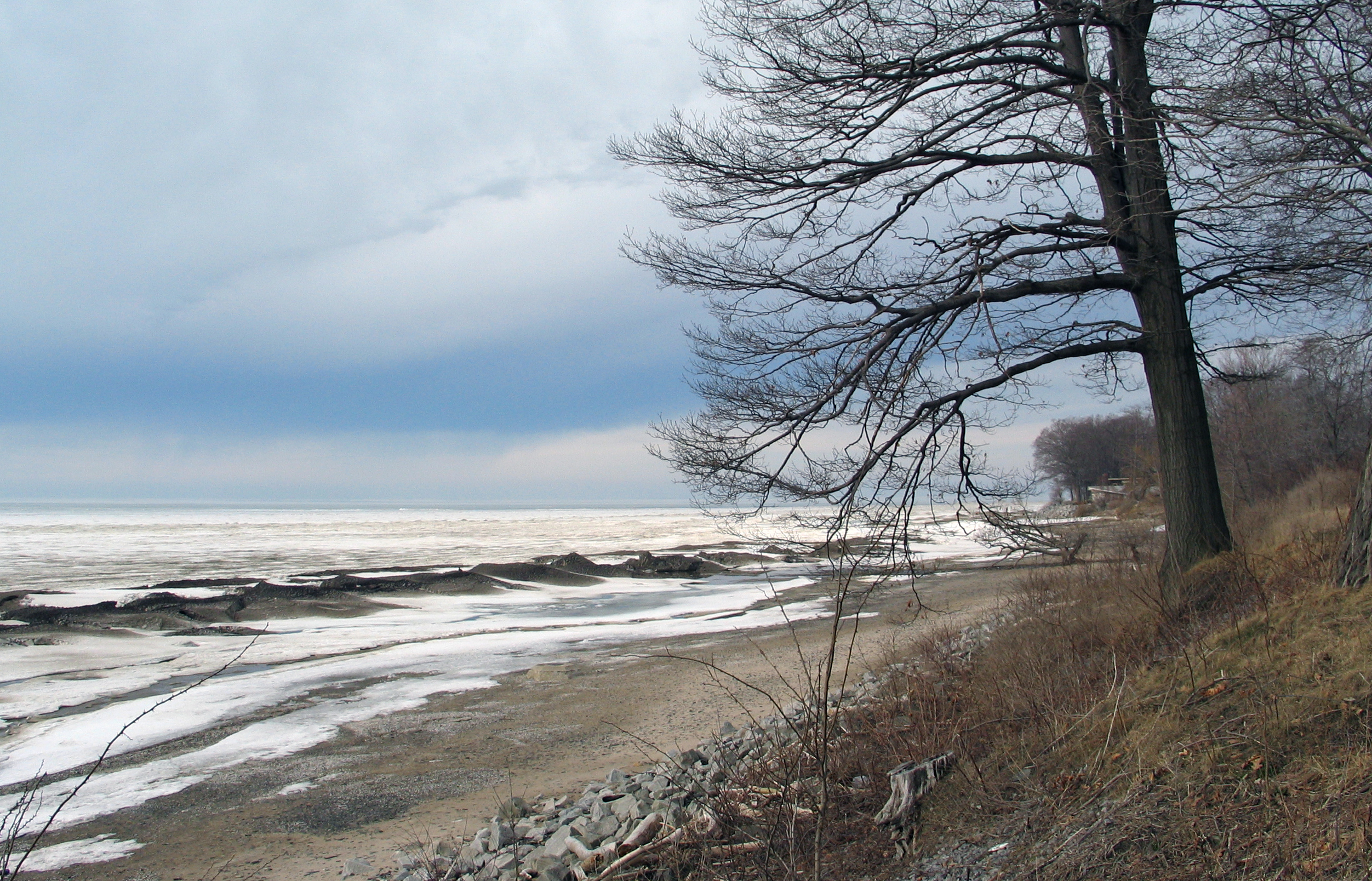
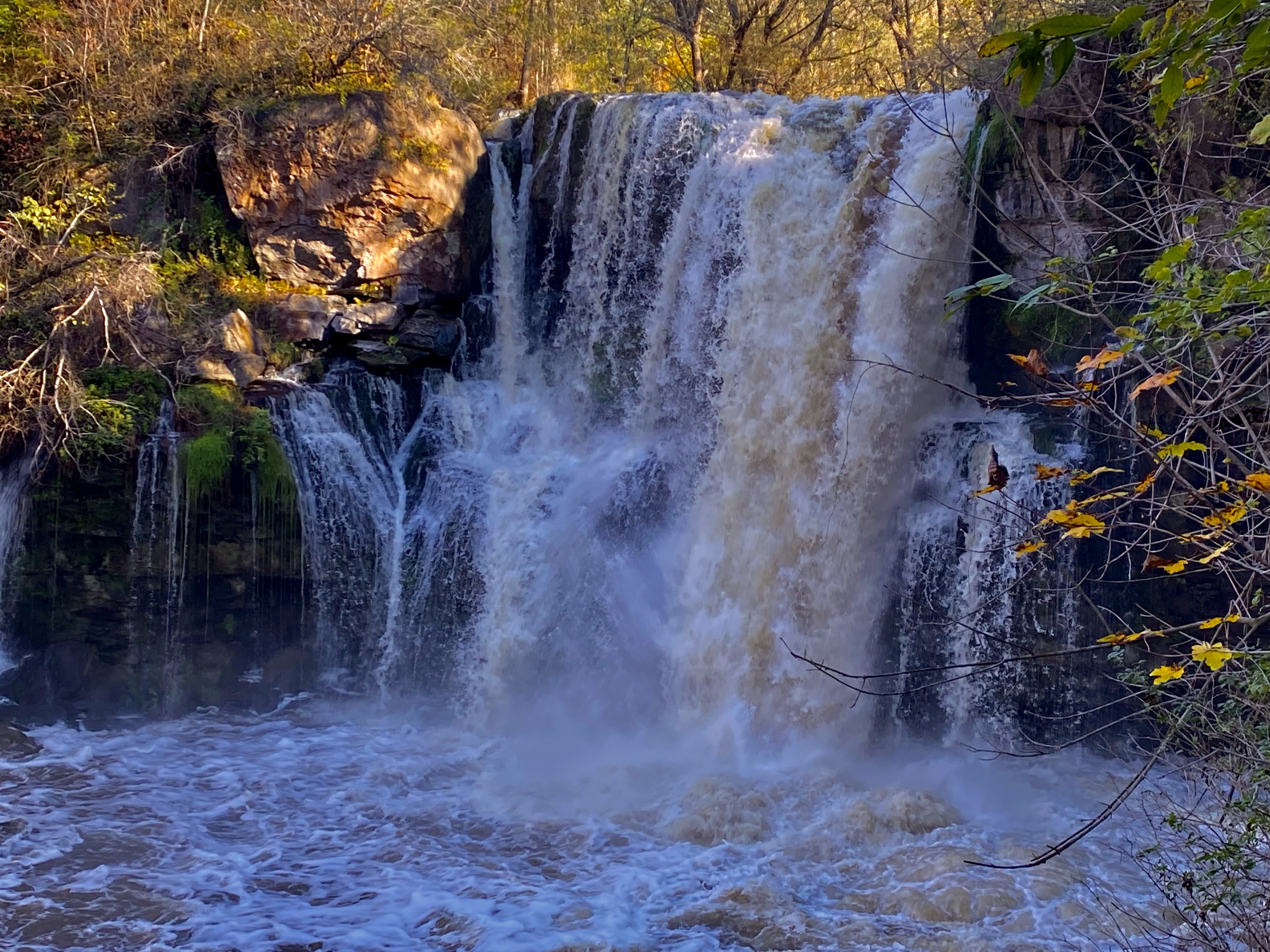
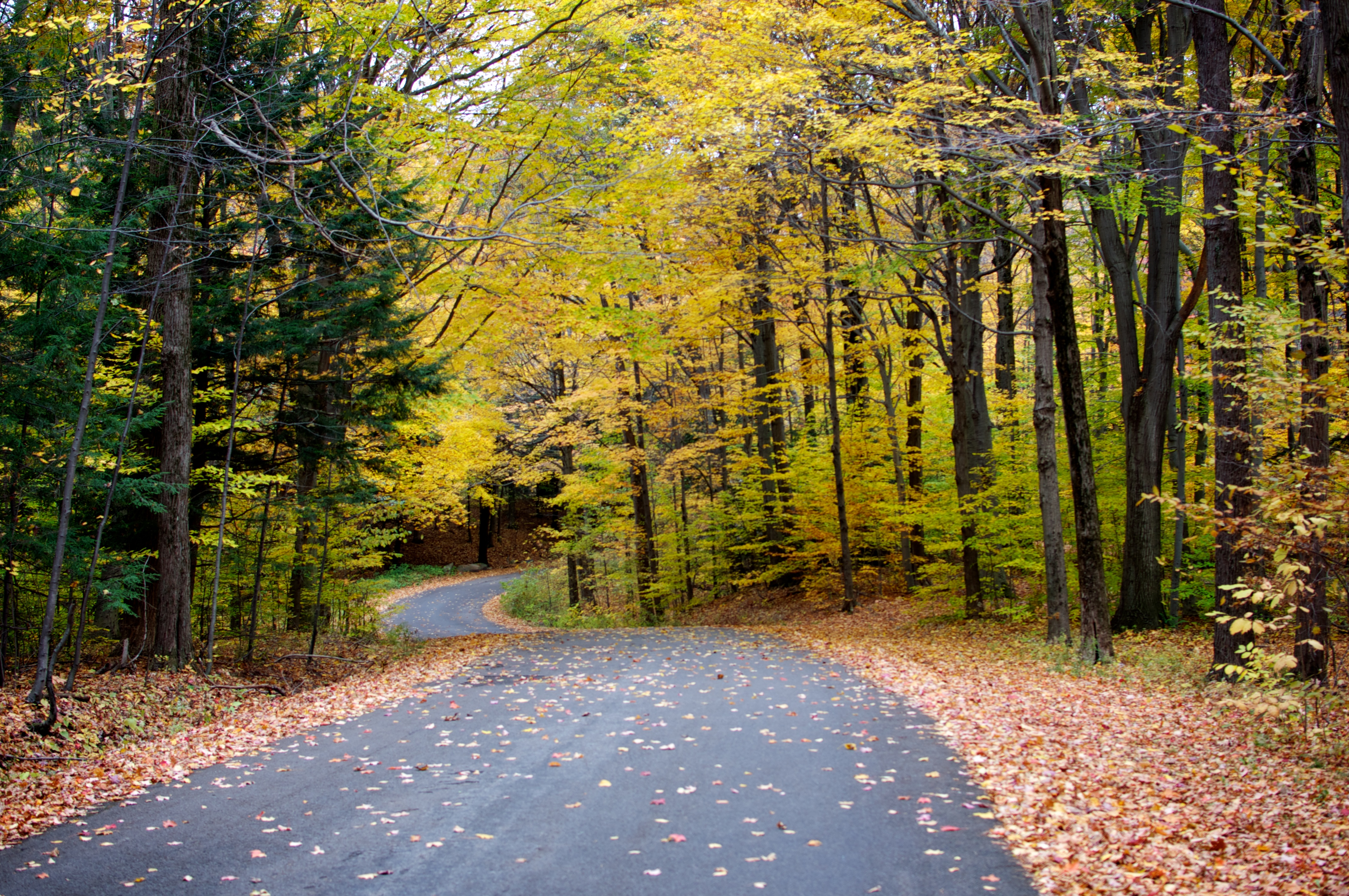
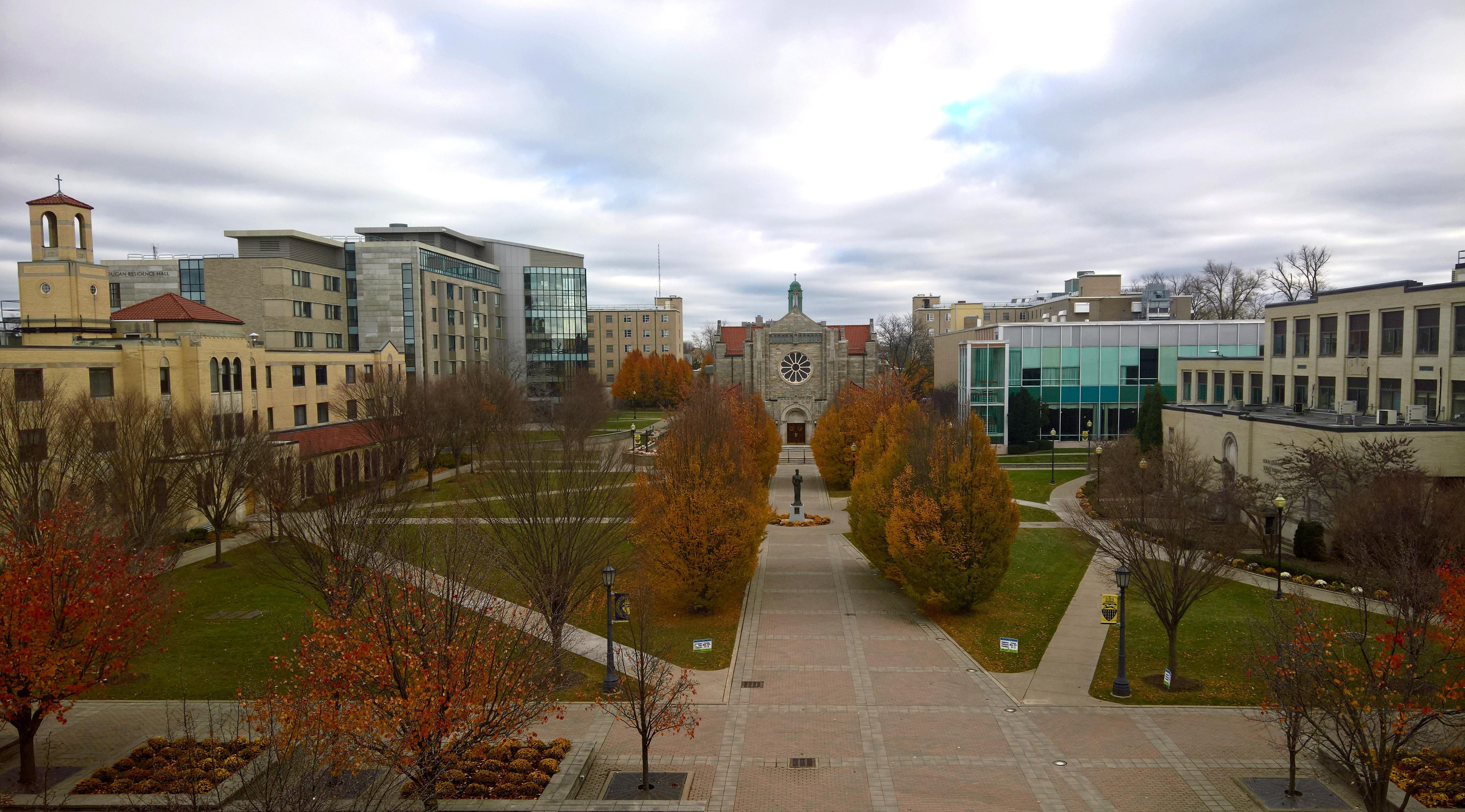
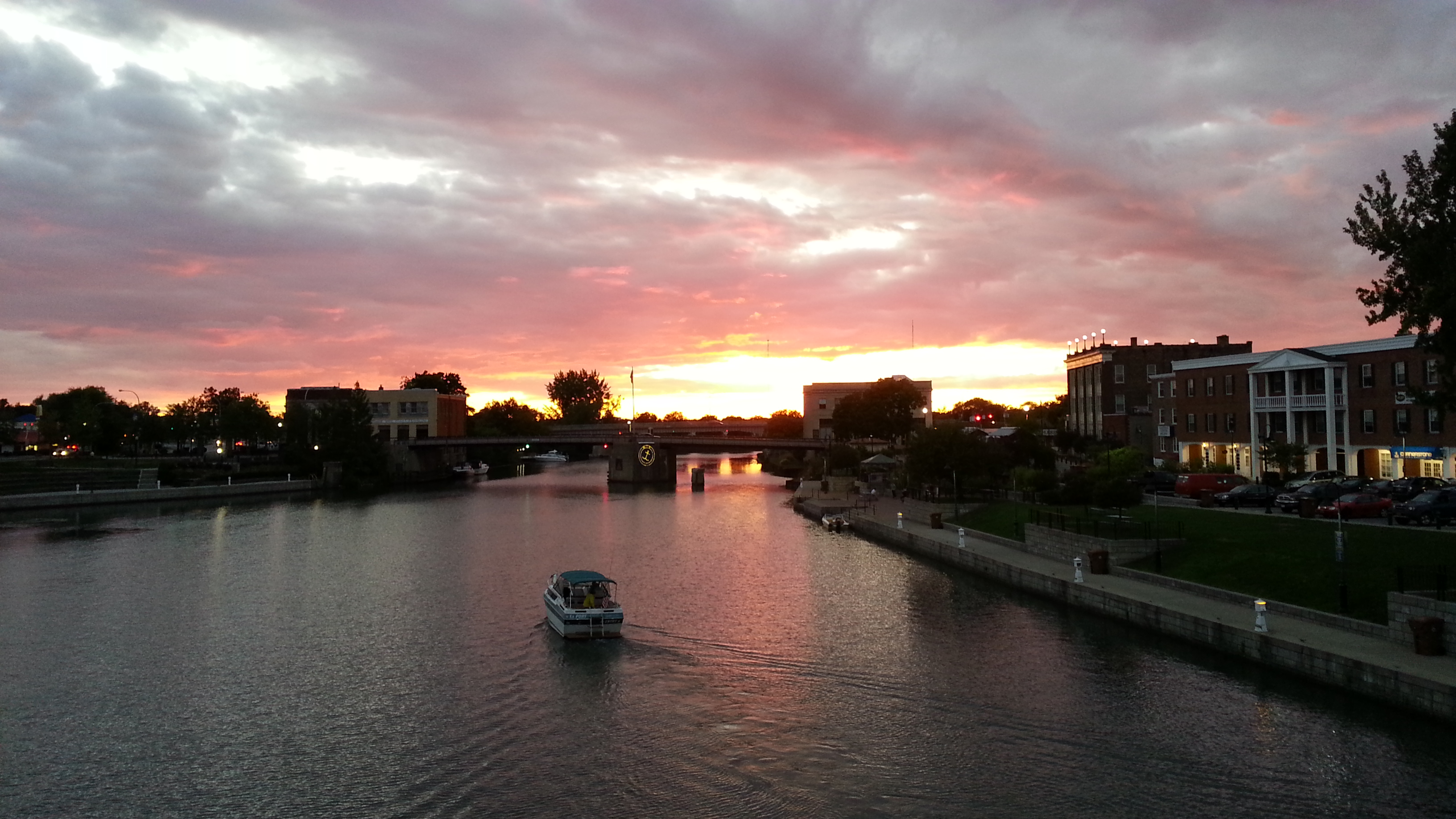
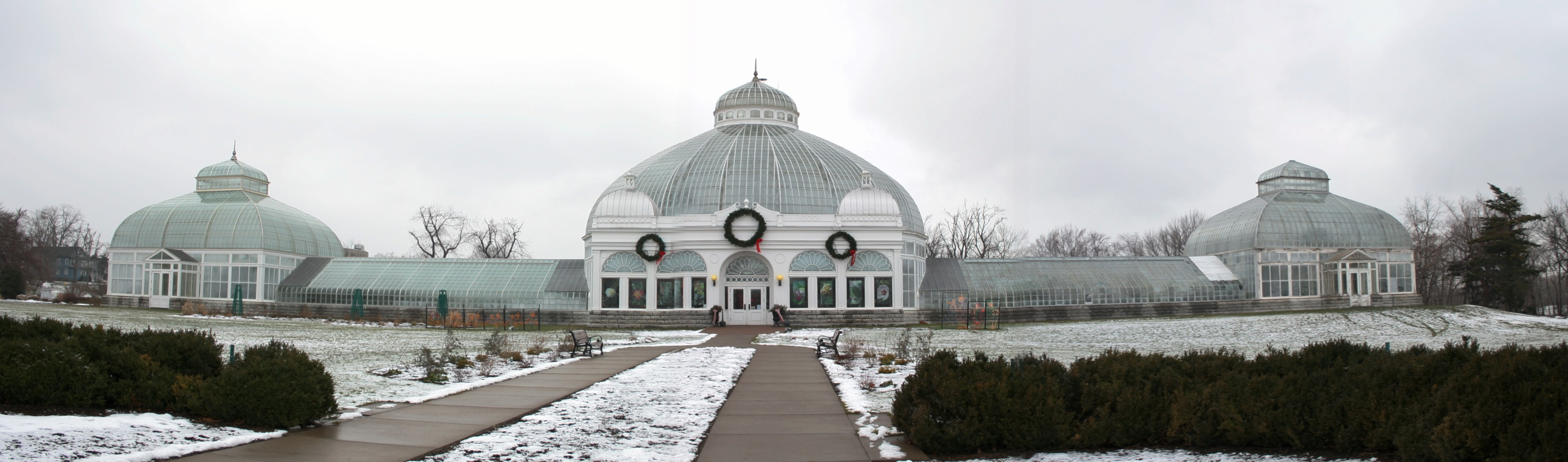
- Left to right from top: Erie County Hall, Wendt Beach Park, Akron Falls Park, Chestnut Ridge Park, Canisius University, Gateway Park, Buffalo and Erie County Botanical Gardens

- Flag Seal

- Location within the U.S. state of New York
- Coordinates: 42°45′N 78°47′W
- Country: United States
- State: New York
- Founded: 1821
- Named for: Eriechronon
- Seat: Buffalo
- Largest city: Buffalo

Government
  - County Executive: Mark Poloncarz (D)

Area
  - Total: 1,227 sq mi (3,180 km^{2})
  - Land: 1,043 sq mi (2,700 km^{2})
  - Water: 184 sq mi (480 km^{2}) 15%

Population (2020)
  - Total: 954,236
  - Density: 914.9/sq mi (353.2/km^{2})
- Time zone: UTC−5 (Eastern)
  - Summer (DST): UTC−4 (EDT)
- Congressional districts: 23rd, 26th
- Website: erie.gov

Erie County is a large urban county along the shore of Lake Erie in the western region of the U.S. state of New York, and the most populated county in New York State outside of the NYC Metro. As of the 2020 census, the population was 954,236. The county seat is Buffalo, which makes up about 28% of the county's population. Both the county and Lake Erie were named for the Indigenous Iroquoian language-speaking Erie people, who lived in the area before 1654. They were later pushed out or assimilated by the neighboring Haudenosaunee (Iroquois) during the Beaver Wars. The county is part of the Western New York region of the state.

Erie County, along with its northern neighbor Niagara County, makes up the Buffalo–Niagara Falls metropolitan area, the second largest in the State of New York behind New York City. The county's southern part is known as the Southtowns.

== History ==
When counties were established by the English colonial authorities in the Province of New York in 1683, present-day Erie County was inhabited by the Haudenosaunee. Significant colonization by White Americans did not begin until after the United States had gained independence with the end of the American Revolutionary War in 1783. The U.S. forced the Haudenosaunee to cede most of their lands, as many had been allies of the British during the conflict.

About 1800, the Holland Land Company, formed by American businessmen and their Dutch associates, extinguished aboriginal claims by purchasing the land from New York, acquired the title to the territory of what are today the eight westernmost counties of New York, surveyed their holdings, established towns and began selling lots to individuals. The state was eager to attract settlers and have homesteads and businesses developed. At this time, all of western New York was included in Ontario County.

As the population increased, the state legislature created Genesee County in 1802 out of part of Ontario County. In 1808, Niagara County was created out of Genesee County. In 1821, Erie County was created out of Niagara County, encompassing all the land between Tonawanda Creek and Cattaraugus Creek. The first towns formed in present-day Erie County were the Town of Clarence and the Town of Willink. Clarence and Willink comprised the northern and southern portions of Erie county, respectively. Clarence is still a distinct town, but Willink was quickly subdivided into other towns. When Erie County was established in 1821, it consisted of the towns of Amherst, Aurora, Boston, Clarence, Collins, Concord, Eden, Evans, Hamburg, Holland, Sardinia and Wales.

The county has a number of houses and other properties listed on the National Register of Historic Places listings in Erie County, New York.

In 1861, the hamlet of Town Line in the Town of Lancaster voted 85–40 to secede from the Union. Town Line never sought admission into the Confederate States of America and there is no evidence that men from the community ever fought for the Confederacy. Some reporting from that time indicates the vote was a joke. On January 24, 1946, as part of a nationally reported event, Town Line voted to officially return to the Union after 85 years of Union secession.

== Geography ==
According to the U.S. Census Bureau, the county has a total area of 1,227 square miles (3,180 km^{2}), of which 1,043 square miles (2,700 km^{2}) (85%) is land and 184 square miles (480 km^{2}) (15%) is water.

Erie County is in the western portion of upstate New York, bordering on the lake of the same name. Part of the industrial area that has included Buffalo, it is the most populous county in upstate New York outside of the New York City metropolitan area. The county also lies on the international border between the United States and Canada, bordering the Province of Ontario.

The northern border of the county is Tonawanda Creek. Part of the southern border is Cattaraugus Creek. Other major streams include Buffalo Creek (Buffalo River), Cayuga Creek, Cazenovia Creek, Scajaquada Creek, Eighteen Mile Creek and Ellicott Creek. The county's northern half, including Buffalo and its suburbs, is known as the Northtowns and is relatively flat and rises gently up from the lake. The southern half, known as the Southtowns, is much hillier. It has the northwesternmost foothills of the Appalachian Mountains. The highest elevation in the county is a hill in the Town of Sardinia that tops out at around 1,940 feet (590 m) above sea level. The lowest ground is about 560 feet (170 m), on Grand Island at the Niagara River. The Onondaga Escarpment runs through the northern part of Erie County.

=== Rivers, streams and lakes ===
- Buffalo River
- Cattaraugus Creek
- Cayuga Creek
- Cazenovia Creek
- Eighteen Mile Creek
- Ellicott Creek
- Lake Erie
- Niagara River
- Scajaquada Creek
- Tonawanda Creek

=== Adjacent counties and municipality ===
- Niagara County – north
- Genesee County – northeast
- Wyoming County – southeast
- Cattaraugus County – south
- Chautauqua County – southwest
- Niagara Region, Ontario, Canada – northwest

=== Major highways ===
- Interstate 90 (New York State Thruway)
- Interstate 190 (Niagara Thruway)
- Interstate 290 (Youngmann Expressway)
- Interstate 990 (Lockport Expressway)
- U.S. Route 20 (Southwestern Boulevard/Transit Road/Broadway)
- U.S. Route 20A (Big Tree Road)
- U.S. Route 62 (South Park Avenue/Bailey Avenue/Niagara Falls Boulevard)
- U.S. Route 219 (Southern Expressway)
- New York State Route 5 (Hamburg Turnpike/Buffalo Skyway/Main Street)
- New York State Route 16 (Seneca Street)
- New York State Route 33 (Kensington Expressway/Genesee Street)
- New York State Route 39
- New York State Route 78 (Transit Road)
- New York State Route 179 (Milestrip Expressway/Road)
- New York State Route 198 (Scajaquada Expressway)
- New York State Route 263 (Grover Cleveland Highway/Millersport Highway)
- New York State Route 240 (Orchard Park Road/Harlem Road)
- New York State Route 277 (Union Road)
- New York State Route 324 (Grand Island Boulevard/Sheridan Drive)
- New York State Route 354 (Clinton Street)
- New York State Route 400 (Aurora Expressway)

=== National protected area ===
- Theodore Roosevelt Inaugural National Historic Site

=== State protected areas ===
- Amherst State Park, Town of Amherst
- Beaver Island State Park, Town of Grand Island
- Buckhorn Island State Park, Town of Grand Island
- Buffalo Harbor State Park, City of Buffalo
- Evangola State Park, Towns of Brant and Evans
- Great Baehre Swamp Wildlife Management Area, Town of Amherst
- Hampton Brook Woods Wildlife Management Area, Village of Hamburg
- Knox Farm State Park, Town of East Aurora
- Motor Island Wildlife Management Area, Town of Grand Island
- Onondaga Escarpment Unique Area, Town of Akron
- Reinstein Woods Nature Preserve, Town of Cheektowaga
- Spicer Creek Wildlife Management Area, Town of Grand Island
- Strawberry Island State Park, Town of Townawanda
- Tillman Road Wildlife Management Area, Town of Clarence
- Woodlawn Beach State Park, Town of Hamburg
- Zoar Valley Multiple Use Area, Town of Collins

== Demographics ==
Historical population
Census	Pop.	Note	%±
1830	35,719		—
1840	62,465		74.9%
1850	100,993		61.7%
1860	141,971		40.6%
1870	178,699		25.9%
1880	219,884		23.0%
1890	322,981		46.9%
1900	433,686		34.3%
1910	528,985		22.0%
1920	634,688		20.0%
1930	762,408		20.1%
1940	798,377		4.7%
1950	899,238		12.6%
1960	1,064,688		18.4%
1970	1,113,491		4.6%
1980	1,015,472		−8.8%
1990	968,532		−4.6%
2000	950,265		−1.9%
2010	919,040		−3.3%
2020	954,236		3.8%
2025 (est.)	946,741	▼	−0.8%
U.S. Decennial Census; 1790-1960 1900-1990; 1990-2000 2010-2014

As of the 2023, there were 954,236 people living in the county. The population density was 915 inhabitants per square mile (353/km^{2}). There were 438,747 housing units at an average density of 421 per square mile (163/km^{2}). The racial makeup of the county was 77.8 White, 13.9% Black or African American, 0.8% Native American, 5.0% Asian, 0.01% Pacific Islander, 2.4% from other races and 5.4% from two or more races. 6.4% of the population were Hispanic or Latino of any race. 19.6% were of German, 17.2% Polish, 14.9% Italian, 11.7% Irish and 5.0% English ancestry according to Census 2000. 91.1% spoke English, 3% Spanish and 1.6% Polish as their first language.

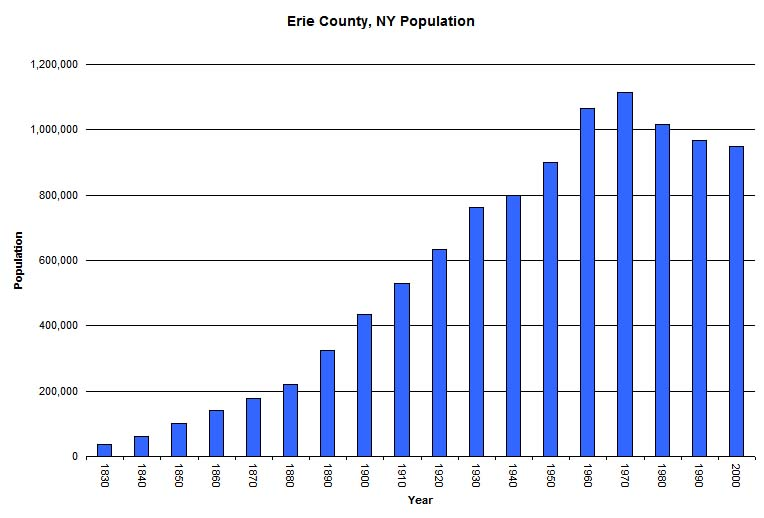
Erie County population

There were 380,873 households, out of which 29.6% had children under the age of 18 living with them, 46.5% were married couples living together, 13.7% had a female householder with no husband present and 36.1% were non-families. 30.5% of all households were made up of individuals, and 12.5% had someone living alone who was 65 years of age or older. The average household size was 2.41 and the average family size was 3.04. In the county, the population was spread out, with 24.3% under 18, 8.7% from 18 to 24, 28.4% from 25 to 44, 22.7% from 45 to 64, and 15.9% older than 65. The median age was 38 years. For every 100 females, there were 91.6 males. For every 100 females age 18 and over, there were 87.8 males.

The median income for a household in the county was $38,567 and the median income for a family was $49,490. Males had a median income of $38,703 versus $26,510 for females. The per capita income for the county was $20,357. About 9.2% of families and 12.2% of the population were below the poverty line, including 17.3% of those under 18 and 7.8% of those older than 65.

=== 2020 census ===
Erie County, New York – Racial and ethnic composition Note: the US Census treats Hispanic/Latino as an ethnic category. This table excludes Latinos from the racial categories and assigns them to a separate category. Hispanics/Latinos may be of any race.
Race / ethnicity (NH = Non-Hispanic)	Pop 1980	Pop 1990	Pop 2000	Pop 2010	Pop 2020	% 1980	% 1990	% 2000	% 2010	% 2020
White alone (NH)	886,457	822,166	767,476	714,156	678,236	87.30%	84.89%	80.76%	77.71%	71.08%
Black or African American alone (NH)	101,969	108,240	121,289	119,916	129,874	10.04%	11.18%	12.76%	13.05%	13.61%
Native American or Alaska Native alone (NH)	5,064	5,357	5,354	5,199	4,667	0.50%	0.55%	0.56%	0.57%	0.49%
Asian alone (NH)	5,424	10,025	13,759	23,621	46,090	0.53%	1.04%	1.45%	2.57%	4.83%
Native Hawaiian or Pacific Islander alone (NH)	x	x	156	165	199	x	x	0.02%	0.02%	0.02%
Other race alone (NH)	2,168	495	940	1,023	3,254	0.21%	0.05%	0.10%	0.11%	0.34%
Mixed race or Multiracial (NH)	x	x	10,237	13,229	32,258	x	x	1.08%	1.44%	3.38%
Hispanic or Latino (any race)	14,390	22,249	31,054	41,731	59,658	1.42%	2.30%	3.27%	4.54%	6.25%
Total	1,015,472	968,532	950,265	919,040	954,236	100.00%	100.00%	100.00%	100.00%	100.00%

== County government and politics ==
Prior to 1936, Erie County predominantly backed Republican Party candidates, with only four Democratic Party candidates winning the county in a presidential election - James Buchanan in 1856, George B. McClellan in 1864, Grover Cleveland in 1892 and Woodrow Wilson in 1912. However, starting with the 1936 election, it has turned predominantly Democratic since then, with only two Republicans carrying the county in a presidential election-- Dwight D. Eisenhower in 1952 and 1956 and Richard Nixon in 1972, with Nixon being the most recent. In 2016, like many other counties in the Rust Belt, Donald Trump expanded the Republican vote share thanks to his appeal to working-class whites and Ethnic-Catholic voters, keeping the margin in single digits for the first time since 1984. Four years later, in 2020, Joe Biden won 267,270 votes in Erie County, more than Barack Obama in 2008. Biden's margin of victory, however, was smaller than Obama's 2008 victory within the county and Trump's margin, though declining, was still higher than any Republican since 1988 (aside from his 2016 margin).

United States presidential election results for Erie County, New York
Year	Republican / Whig		Democratic		Third party(ies)	
Year	No.	%	No.	%	No.	%
1828	3,331	72.48%	1,265	27.52%	0	0.00%
1832	4,324	70.46%	1,813	29.54%	0	0.00%
1836	4,882	64.72%	2,661	35.28%	0	0.00%
1840	6,787	64.56%	3,687	35.07%	38	0.36%
1844	6,905	55.82%	5,050	40.82%	415	3.35%
1848	7,647	57.12%	3,360	25.10%	2,381	17.78%
1852	8,025	51.55%	7,033	45.18%	510	3.28%
1856	6,902	34.58%	7,536	37.76%	5,520	27.66%
1860	12,430	53.31%	10,885	46.69%	0	0.00%
1864	13,061	49.42%	13,370	50.58%	0	0.00%
1868	15,822	52.26%	14,454	47.74%	0	0.00%
1872	17,831	58.74%	12,467	41.07%	58	0.19%
1876	20,300	50.85%	19,533	48.93%	90	0.23%
1880	24,199	53.20%	20,848	45.83%	442	0.97%
1884	26,249	50.49%	24,759	47.62%	985	1.89%
1888	31,612	51.06%	29,543	47.71%	762	1.23%
1892	32,340	47.28%	32,431	47.41%	3,632	5.31%
1896	45,612	58.57%	30,172	38.74%	2,095	2.69%
1900	44,767	51.66%	39,833	45.97%	2,057	2.37%
1904	49,669	55.73%	36,582	41.04%	2,881	3.23%
1908	52,182	52.36%	45,185	45.34%	2,293	2.30%
1912	19,185	22.54%	33,518	39.38%	32,410	38.08%
1916	53,638	52.35%	45,622	44.53%	3,200	3.12%
1920	99,762	63.22%	40,436	25.63%	17,598	11.15%
1924	112,070	58.53%	40,780	21.30%	38,630	20.17%
1928	144,726	51.36%	126,449	44.87%	10,614	3.77%
1932	141,059	49.86%	131,012	46.31%	10,859	3.84%
1936	152,312	44.51%	183,555	53.64%	6,341	1.85%
1940	183,664	49.05%	189,779	50.68%	992	0.26%
1944	185,975	48.53%	195,905	51.12%	1,355	0.35%
1948	175,118	45.68%	197,618	51.55%	10,636	2.77%
1952	253,927	56.32%	196,378	43.56%	550	0.12%
1956	292,657	63.68%	166,930	36.32%	0	0.00%
1960	211,957	43.30%	277,203	56.62%	404	0.08%
1964	125,962	26.71%	344,910	73.14%	704	0.15%
1968	167,853	37.04%	250,054	55.18%	35,258	7.78%
1972	256,462	53.88%	218,105	45.82%	1,456	0.31%
1976	220,310	48.65%	229,397	50.66%	3,136	0.69%
1980	169,209	40.24%	215,283	51.20%	35,981	8.56%
1984	222,882	48.28%	237,631	51.47%	1,158	0.25%
1988	188,796	43.83%	238,779	55.43%	3,217	0.75%
1992	129,444	28.67%	196,233	43.46%	125,819	27.87%
1996	132,343	32.26%	224,554	54.74%	53,337	13.00%
2000	160,176	37.72%	240,176	56.56%	24,302	5.72%
2004	184,423	41.43%	251,090	56.41%	9,625	2.16%
2008	178,815	40.46%	256,299	57.99%	6,871	1.55%
2012	169,675	40.97%	237,356	57.31%	7,164	1.73%
2016	188,303	44.45%	215,456	50.86%	19,866	4.69%
2020	197,552	41.73%	267,270	56.46%	8,596	1.82%
2024	204,774	44.52%	248,651	54.06%	6,501	1.41%

=== Erie County executives ===
Name	Party	Term
Edward C. Rath	Republican	1962–1969
B. John Tutuska	Republican	1969–1971
Edward Regan	Republican	1972–1978
Ed Rutkowski	Republican	1979–1987
Dennis Gorski	Democratic	1988–1999
Joel Giambra	Republican	2000–2007
Chris Collins	Republican	2008–2011
Mark Poloncarz	Democratic	2012–Present

=== Elected officials ===
Office	Name	Party	Hometown
County Executive	Mark Poloncarz	Democratic	Buffalo
County Comptroller	Kevin R. Hardwick	Democratic	Tonawanda
County Clerk	Mickey Kearns	Republican	Buffalo
District Attorney	Michael Keane	Democratic	Buffalo
County Sheriff	John C. Garcia	Republican	Buffalo

=== County legislature ===
As of 2025, there are seven Democrats, three Republicans, and one Conservative in the county legislature.

District	Title	Name	Party	Hometown
1		Lawrence J. Dupre	Democratic	Buffalo
2		Taisha St. Jean Tard	Democratic	Buffalo
3		Michael Kooshoian	Democratic	Kenmore
4		John Bargnesi	Democratic	Town of Tonawanda
5		Jeanne Vinal	Democratic	Amherst
6		Christopher D. Greene	Republican	Clarence
7	Chairman	Timothy J. Meyers	Democratic	Cheektowaga
8		Frank J. Todaro	Republican	Lancaster
9	Majority Leader	John Gilmour	Democratic	Hamburg
10		Lindsay R. Lorigo	Conservative	West Seneca
11	Minority Leader	John J. Mills	Republican	Orchard Park

== Education ==
=== School districts ===
School districts include:

- Akron Central School District
- Alden Central School District
- Amherst Central School District
- Attica Central School District
- Buffalo City School District
- Cheektowaga Central School District
- Cheektowaga-Maryvale Union Free School District
- Cheektowaga-Sloan Union Free School District
- Clarence Central School District
- Cleveland Hill Union Free School District
- Depew Union Free School District
- East Aurora Union Free School District
- Eden Central School District
- Evans-Brant Central School District (Lake Shore) a.k.a. Lake Shore Central School District
- Frontier Central School District
- Grand Island Central School District
- Gowanda Central School District
- Hamburg Central School District
- Holland Central School District
- Iroquois Central School District
- Kenmore-Tonawanda Union Free School District
- Lackawanna City School District
- Lancaster Central School District
- North Collins Central School District
- Orchard Park Central School District
- Springville-Griffith Institute Central School District
- Sweet Home Central School District
- Tonawanda City School District
- West Seneca Central School District
- Williamsville Central School District
- Yorkshire-Pioneer Central School District

"Special act" school districts

- Randolph Academy Union Free School District - In 2011 it took the territory of another special act district, Hopevale Union Free School District

As of the 2010 U.S. census, some parts of this county were not in a defined school district, with some undefined land and some undefined water.

=== Higher education ===
- Buffalo State University
- Canisius College
- Daemen College
- D'Youville University
- Erie Community College
- Hilbert College
- Trocaire College
- University at Buffalo
- Villa Maria College
- Bryant & Stratton College
- Empire State University Cheektowaga campus

=== Libraries ===
The Buffalo & Erie County Public Library system has its primary library in Buffalo and 37 branch locations spread across the County.

== Attractions and recreation ==
Erie County is home to three professional teams—the NFL's Buffalo Bills, the NHL's Buffalo Sabres and the NLL's Buffalo Bandits, along with Division I's Buffalo Bulls and MILB's Buffalo Bisons. The city of Buffalo also features the Buffalo Zoo, The Buffalo History Museum, Burchfield-Penney Art Center and Albright-Knox Art Gallery (all located within a mile of each other in the Delaware Park System), Buffalo and Erie County Botanical Gardens and Buffalo Museum of Science, the Frank Lloyd Wright's Martin House Complex in addition to tourist districts such as Canalside and Larkinville. The Erie County Fair, held every August in the Town of Hamburg from 1820 to 2024 (the 2020 event, like much everything else across the country, was cancelled due to the COVID-19 pandemic), is one of the largest county fairs in the United States.

=== Erie County Department of Parks, Recreation and Forestry ===
The Erie County Department of Parks, Recreation and Forestry was established in 1925 with four parks spanning 2,280 acres (9.2 km^{2}). As of 2003, the county managed 38 properties, totaling approximately 11,000 acres (45 km^{2}) of land. Management objectives include providing and maintaining recreational space and the conservation of the county's natural and historic resources. A 2003 Master Plan identified several broad categories of parks operated by the county, including heritage parks, waterfront parks, conservation parks, special purpose parks and forest management areas.

==== Heritage parks ====
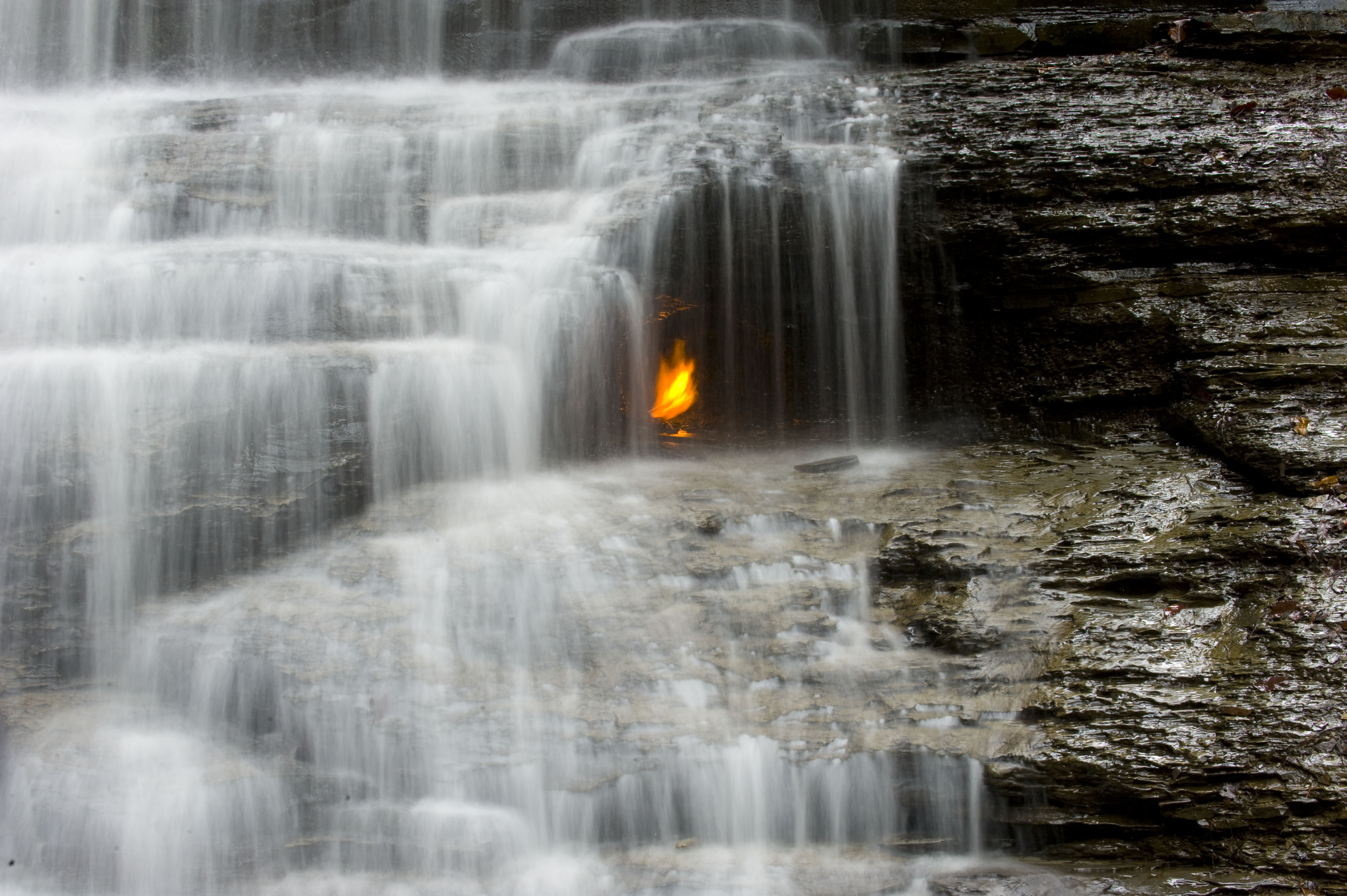
Eternal Flame Falls in Chestnut Ridge Park

Erie County's heritage parks include the five original county parks that were established during the 1920s and 1930s. These parks are examples of multiple-use sites with significant scenic, natural and historic features. Each park has unique man-made structures of historical character, many constructed as part of the Works Progress Administration movement in the 1930s.

- Akron Falls Park (established in 1933, acquired by Erie County in 1947)
- Chestnut Ridge Park (established by Erie County in 1926)
- Como Lake Park (established in 1923, acquired by Erie County in 1926)
- Ellicott Creek Park (established by Erie County in 1926)
- Emery Park (established by Erie County in 1925)

==== Waterfront parks ====
Waterfront parks include the significant scenic sites and recreational trail systems along the county's Lake Erie shoreline.

- Bennett Beach Park
- Isle View Park
- Riverwalk Park
- Wendt Beach Park

==== Conservation parks ====
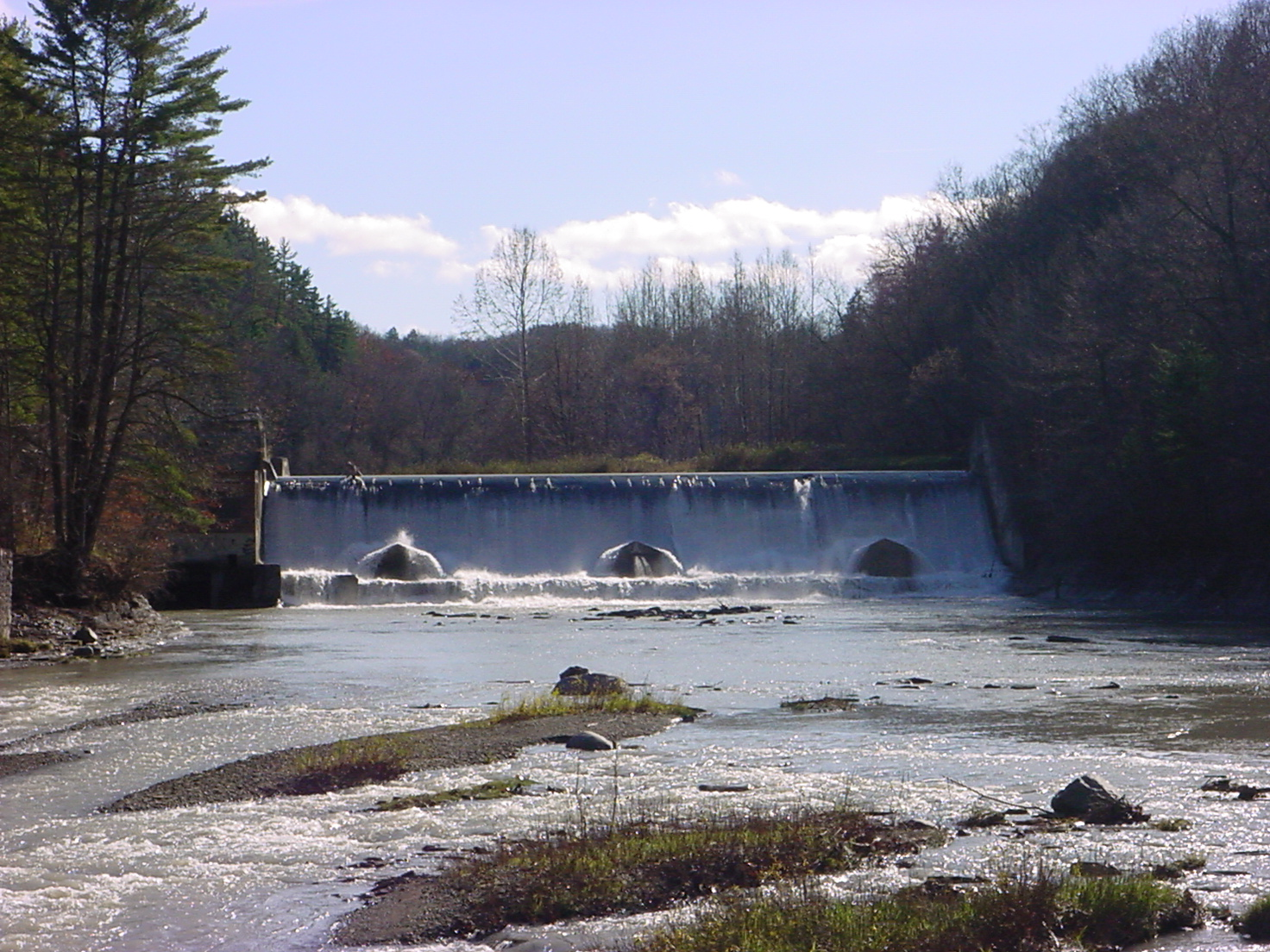
View of the Scoby Dam at Scoby Dam Park

These largely-undeveloped parks are managed primarily for conservation of the natural environment and passive nature-based outdoor recreation activities. These lands are intended to generally remain in a natural state.

- Boston Forest
- Eighteen Mile Creek Park
- Franklin Gulf Park
- Scoby Dam Park
- Sgt. Mark A. Rademacher Memorial Park (commonly known as Hunters Creek Park)

==== Special purpose parks ====
Special purpose parks have unique characteristics that provide specific recreational functions within the county's park system.

- Buffalo and Erie County Botanical Gardens
- Elma Meadows Golf Course
- Grover Cleveland Golf Course
- Sprague Brook Park

==== Forest management areas ====
Forest management areas are managed by the Erie County Bureau of Forestry, which was established in 1927. These areas include several thousand acres of mostly-coniferous plantation style forest, much of which was planted on abandoned farmland by the Civilian Conservation Corps in the 1930s. These areas are located mostly in the rural southern portion of the county. These lands have limited recreation potential, mostly in the form of trails. Management of these lands is focused on natural resource conservation, in addition to potential commercial resource extraction of timber products or maple syrup.

== Communities ==
#	Location	Population (2010)	Type	Area
1	†Buffalo	278,349	City	Greater Buffalo
2	Cheektowaga	75,178	CDP	Greater Buffalo
3	Tonawanda	58,144	CDP	Greater Buffalo
4	West Seneca	44,711	CDP	Greater Buffalo
5	Lackawanna	19,949	City	Greater Buffalo
6	Kenmore	15,423	Village	Greater Buffalo
7	Depew	15,303	Village	Greater Buffalo
8	Tonawanda	15,130	City	Greater Buffalo
9	Eggertsville	15,019	CDP	Greater Buffalo
10	Lancaster	10,352	Village	Greater Buffalo
11	Hamburg	9,409	Village	Greater Buffalo
12	East Aurora	6,236	Village	Greater Buffalo
13	Harris Hill	5,508	CDP	Greater Buffalo
14	Williamsville	5,300	Village	Greater Buffalo
15	Grandyle Village	4,629	CDP	Greater Buffalo
16	Springville	4,296	Village	Southern
17	Lake Erie Beach	3,872	CDP	Southern
18	Sloan	3,661	Village	Greater Buffalo
19	Eden	3,516	CDP	Southern
20	Orchard Park	3,246	Village	Greater Buffalo
21	Wanakah	3,199	CDP	Greater Buffalo
22	Akron	2,868	Village	Northeast
23	‡Gowanda	2,709	Village	Southern
24	Clarence	2,646	CDP	Greater Buffalo
25	Alden	2,605	Village	Northeast
26	Elma Center	2,571	CDP	Greater Buffalo
27	Blasdell	2,553	Village	Greater Buffalo
28	North Boston	2,521	CDP	Southern
29	Town Line	2,367	CDP	Northeast
30	Angola	2,127	Village	Southern
31	Billington Heights	1,685	CDP	Greater Buffalo
32	Angola on the Lake	1,675	CDP	Southern
33	North Collins	1,232	Village	Southern
34	Holland	1,206	CDP	Southern
35	Farnham	386	Village	Southern
-	Highland-on-the-Lake	N/A	CDP	Southern
-	University at Buffalo	N/A	CDP	Buffalo

† – County seat

‡ – Not wholly in this county

=== Cities ===
- Buffalo
- Lackawanna
- Tonawanda

=== Towns ===
- Alden
- Amherst
- Aurora
- Boston
- Brant
- Cheektowaga
- Clarence
- Colden
- Collins
- Concord
- Eden
- Elma
- Evans
- Grand Island
- Hamburg
- Holland
- Lancaster
- Marilla
- Newstead
- North Collins
- Orchard Park
- Sardinia
- Tonawanda
- Wales
- West Seneca

=== Villages ===
- Akron
- Alden
- Angola
- Blasdell
- Depew
- East Aurora
- Farnham
- Hamburg
- Kenmore
- Lancaster
- North Collins
- Orchard Park
- Sloan
- Springville
- Williamsville
- Gowanda (partly located in Erie and Cattaraugus counties)

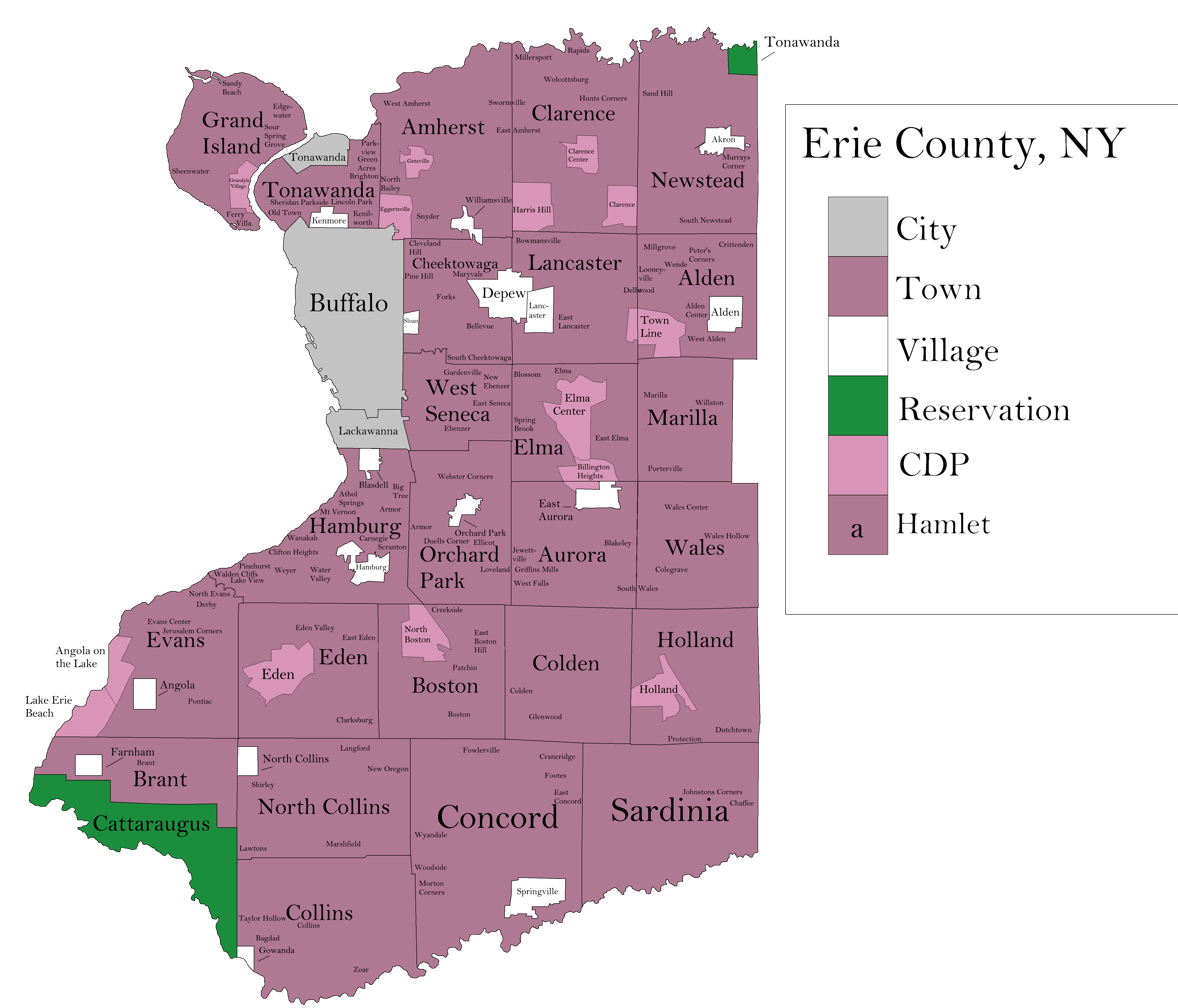
Map showing the municipalities of Erie County

=== Hamlets ===
- Akron Junction
- Alden Center
- Armor
- Athol Springs
- Bagdad
- Bellevue
- Big Tree
- Blakeley
- Blossom
- Boston
- Bowmansville
- Brant
- Brighton
- Carnegie
- Chaffee
- Clarksburg
- Cleveland Hill
- Clifton Heights
- Collins Center
- Concord
- Creekside
- Crittenden
- Dellwood
- Derby
- Doyle
- Duells Corner
- Dutchtown
- East Amherst
- East Concord
- East Eden
- East Elma
- East Seneca
- Ebenezer
- Eden Valley
- Ellicott
- Elma
- Evans Center
- Ferry Village
- Footes
- Forks
- Fowlerville
- Gardenville
- Getzville
- Glenwood
- Green Acres
- Griffins Mills
- Holland
- Hunts Corners
- Jerusalem Corners
- Jewettville
- Kenilworth
- Lake View
- Langford
- Lawtons
- Locksley Park
- Looneyville
- Loveland
- Marilla
- Marshfield
- Millersport
- Millgrove
- Morton Corners
- Mount Vernon
- Murrays Corner
- New Ebenezer
- New Oregon
- North Bailey
- North Evans
- Oakfield
- Patchin
- Peters Corners
- Pine Hill
- Pinehurst
- Pontiac
- Porterville
- Protection
- Sand Hill
- Sandy Beach
- Scranton
- Sheenwater
- Shirley
- Snyder
- South Cheektowaga
- South Newstead
- South Wales
- Spring Brook
- Swifts Mills
- Swormville
- Taylor Hollow
- Town Line Station
- Walden Cliffs
- Wales Hollow
- Water Valley
- Webster Corners
- Wende
- West Alden
- West Falls
- Weyer
- Williston
- Windom
- Wolcottsburg
- Woodlawn
- Woodside
- Wyandale
- Zoar

=== Indian reservations ===
- Cattaraugus Reservation
- Tonawanda Reservation

== Healthcare of Erie County ==
Erie County is home to many hospitals. Erie County is home to the Kaleida Health and Catholic Health health systems, which operate facilities all around Western New York. Erie County is home to the region's only Level I Trauma Center which is Erie County Medical Center, and the regions only Level I Pediatric Trauma Center which is Golisano Children's Hospital of Buffalo. Erie County is home to the major Buffalo Niagara Medical Campus which is home to both Golisano Children's, Buffalo General Medical Center and Roswell Park Comprehensive Cancer Center. Kaleida Health operates many hospitals in the county like Golisano Children's, BGMC, and Millard Fillmore Suburban Hospital. Catholic Health also operates many hospitals in the county like Sisters of Charity Hospital (Buffalo), Mercy Hospital of Buffalo, and Sisters of Charity Hospital St Joseph Campus. The northern region of the county is served by Millard Fillmore Suburban Hospital in Williamsville, New York, and Kenmore Mercy Hospital in Kenmore, New York. The eastern region of the county does not have hospitals but is closest to St Joseph Campus in Cheektowaga, New York, and Wyoming County Community Health System in Warsaw, Wyoming County, New York. The Southtowns are served by the Mercy Ambulatory Care Center in Hamburg, which is a 2 bed hospital. The suburbs of Buffalo are majorly served by Buffalo hospitals, but Cheektowaga has St. Joseph Campus, Hamburg has the MACC, Kenmore has Kenmore Mercy, and Williamsville has Millard Fillmore Suburban. The southern part of the county is served by Bertrand Chaffee Hospital in Springville, New York. The southwestern most point of the county used to be served by Lakeshore Hospital in Irving, New York but it closed in 2020 and is now served by Brooks Memorial Hospital in Dunkirk, New York, and Buffalo hospitals.

== See also ==
- Erie County Sheriff's Office
- Erie Township, Illinois
- Erie Township, Minnesota
- List of counties in New York
- National Register of Historic Places listings in Erie County, New York
