= Armor, New York =

- Hamlet
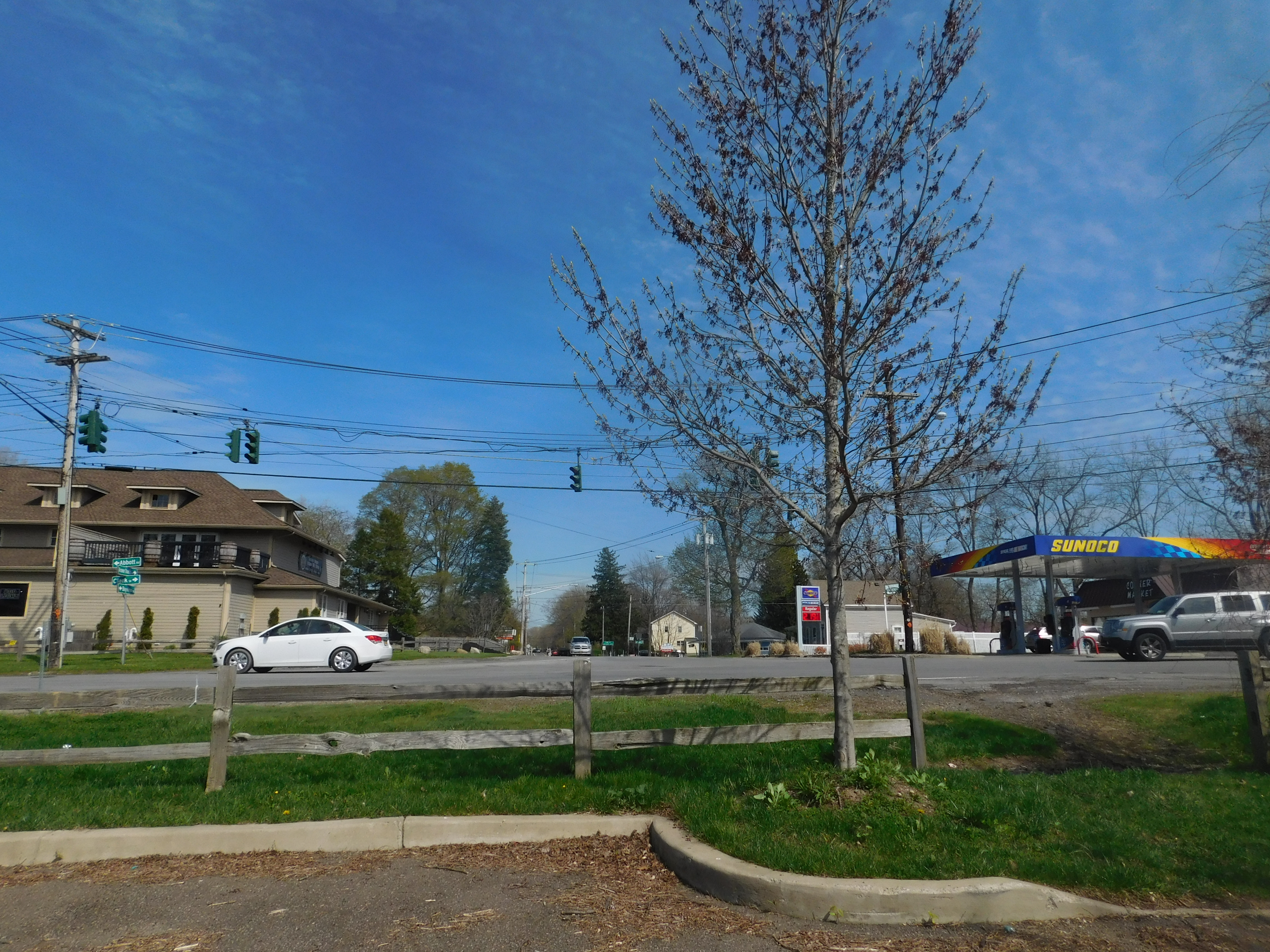
- Armor in May 2020.

- Location in New York Armor (the United States)
- Coordinates: 42°44′26″N 78°47′56″W
- Country: United States
- State: New York
- County: Erie
- Towns: Hamburg, Orchard Park
- Elevation: 820 ft (250 m)
- Time zone: UTC-5 (Eastern (EST))
  - Summer (DST): UTC-4 (EDT)
- Area code: 716
- GNIS feature ID: 942568

Armor is a hamlet in the towns of Hamburg and Orchard Park in Erie County, New York, United States.
