= Chestnut Ridge Park =

Park in Orchard Park, New York

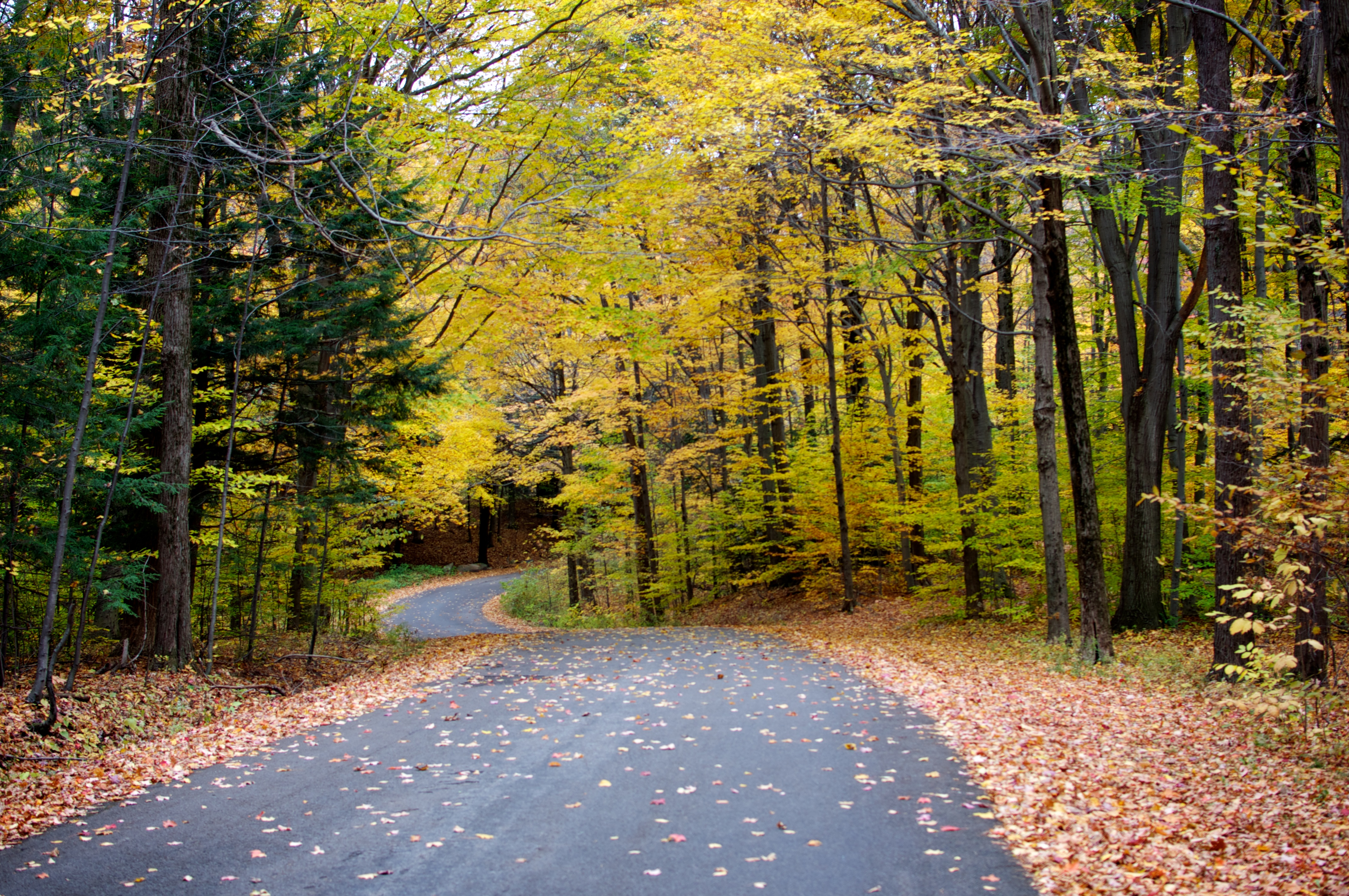
- Fall scene in Chestnut Ridge Park

- Location within New York
- Type: Regional park
- Location: 6121 Chestnut Ridge Road Orchard Park, NY
- Nearest city: Buffalo, New York
- Coordinates: 42°42′50″N 78°45′46″W
- Area: 1,213 acres (4.91 km^{2})
- Created: 1926
- Operator: Erie County Department of Parks, Recreation and Forestry
- Open: All year; 7:00 am - dusk
- Website: Chestnut Ridge Park

Chestnut Ridge Park is a 1,213-acre (4.91 km^{2}) park in Orchard Park, New York, originally named for the chestnut trees on its hills. It is currently the largest park operated by the Erie County Department of Parks, Recreation and Forestry, and is open year-round.

The Chestnut Ridge Park property was acquired by Erie County in 1926, and it was one of the first parks established by the county. The park's facilities and landscapes were improved substantially by the Works Progress Administration throughout the 1930s.

== Facilities and Attractions ==
The park has facilities and space for tennis, hiking, disc golf, snowmobiling, sledding and other outdoor activities. The Buffalo Philharmonic Orchestra has held summer concerts at the base of the sledding hill, which provides an amphitheater-like setting. On a clear day, the sledding hill offers views of Buffalo and Lake Erie. Toboggan chutes also operate on the sled hill during the winter. The Eternal Flame Falls, a small waterfall containing a natural "eternal flame," is located within the park. The falls are situated within what was once known as the Shale Creek Preserve, a wilderness area formerly owned by the Buffalo Museum of Science. A tower facility used for firefighter training is located on the premises.

The main lodge located at the top of the sledding hill contains park information, picnic tables, vending machines, and a café. Multiple cafés have opened and closed in the lodge, one being The Grateful Grind, which opened late December of 2018, serving breakfast foods until it closed in August of 2023. The current café, The Lodge, was opened in 2023 and currently serves concession food. The main lodge also has a tower viewer looking north, giving views of Highmark Stadium, the city of Buffalo, and on a clear day, Niagara Falls and the Canada–United States border.

Although said to be one of the largest county parks in the United States, at least one larger county park is located nearby. The 2,500-acre (10 km^{2}) Mendon Ponds Park, a county park in Monroe County, New York, is situated approximately 80 miles (130 km) away.

Electric vehicle (EV) chargers have been installed in the park.

== Gallery ==
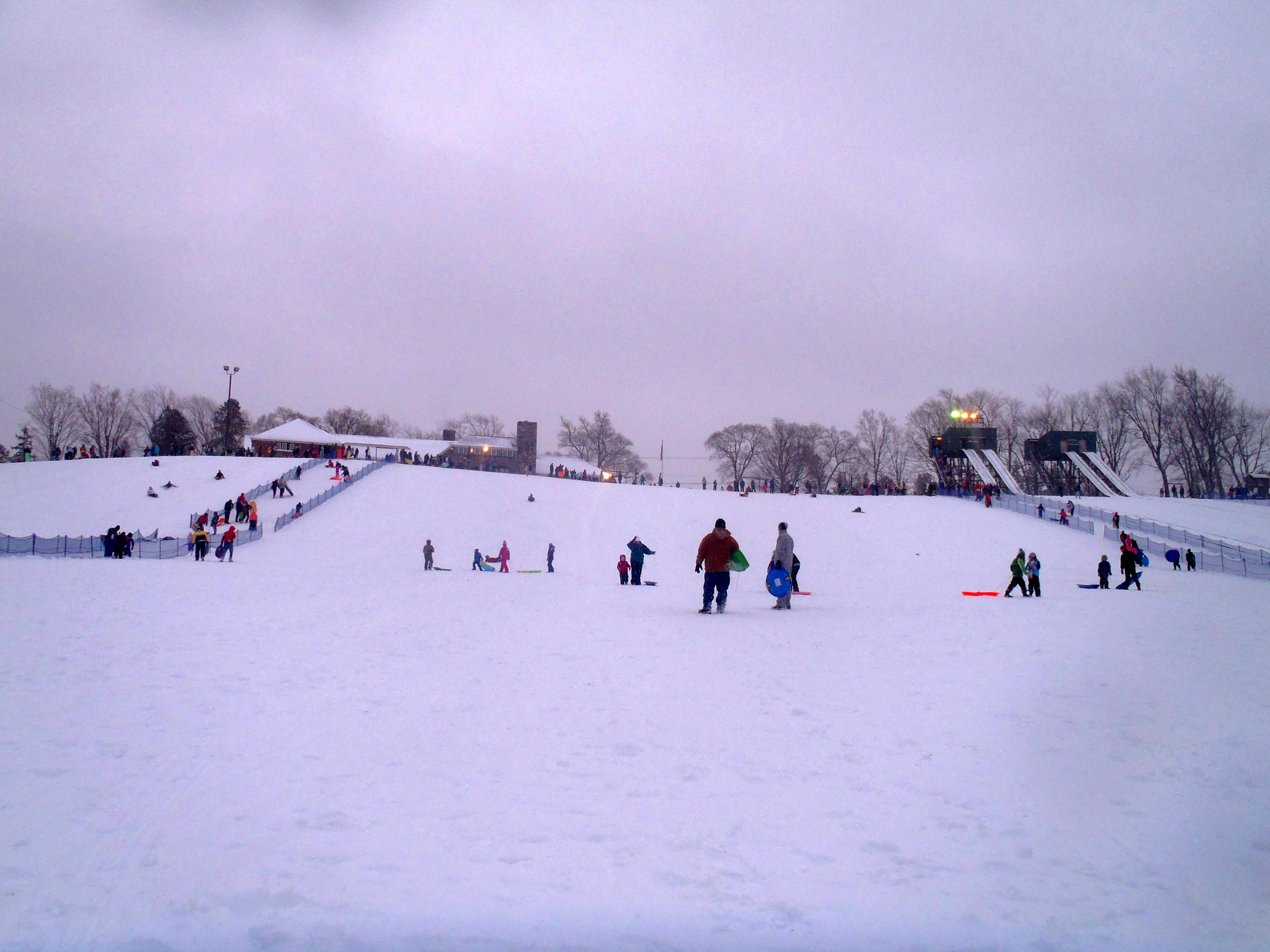
Chestnut Ridge Park sledding hill

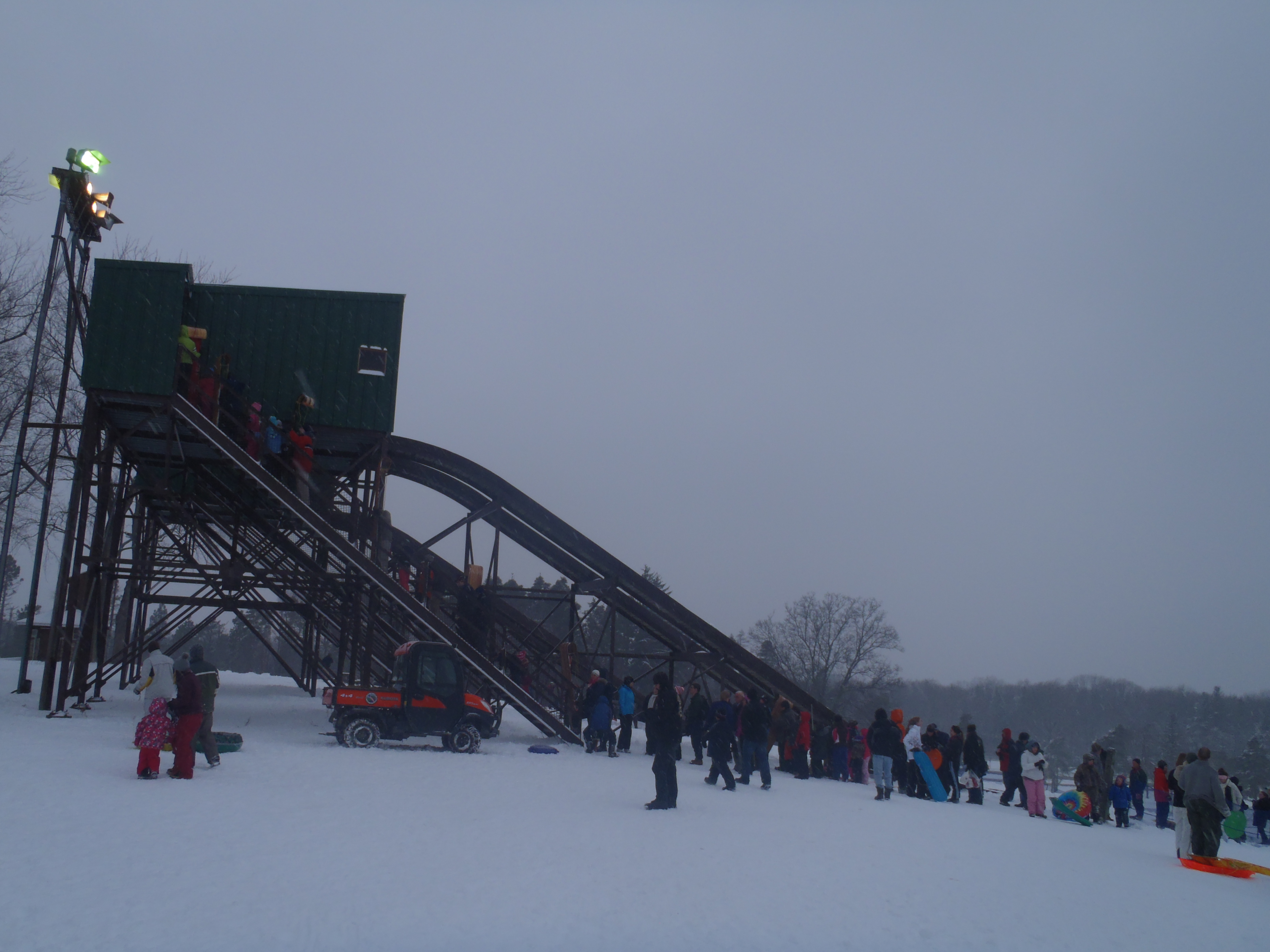
Toboggan chutes at Chestnut Ridge Park sledding hill

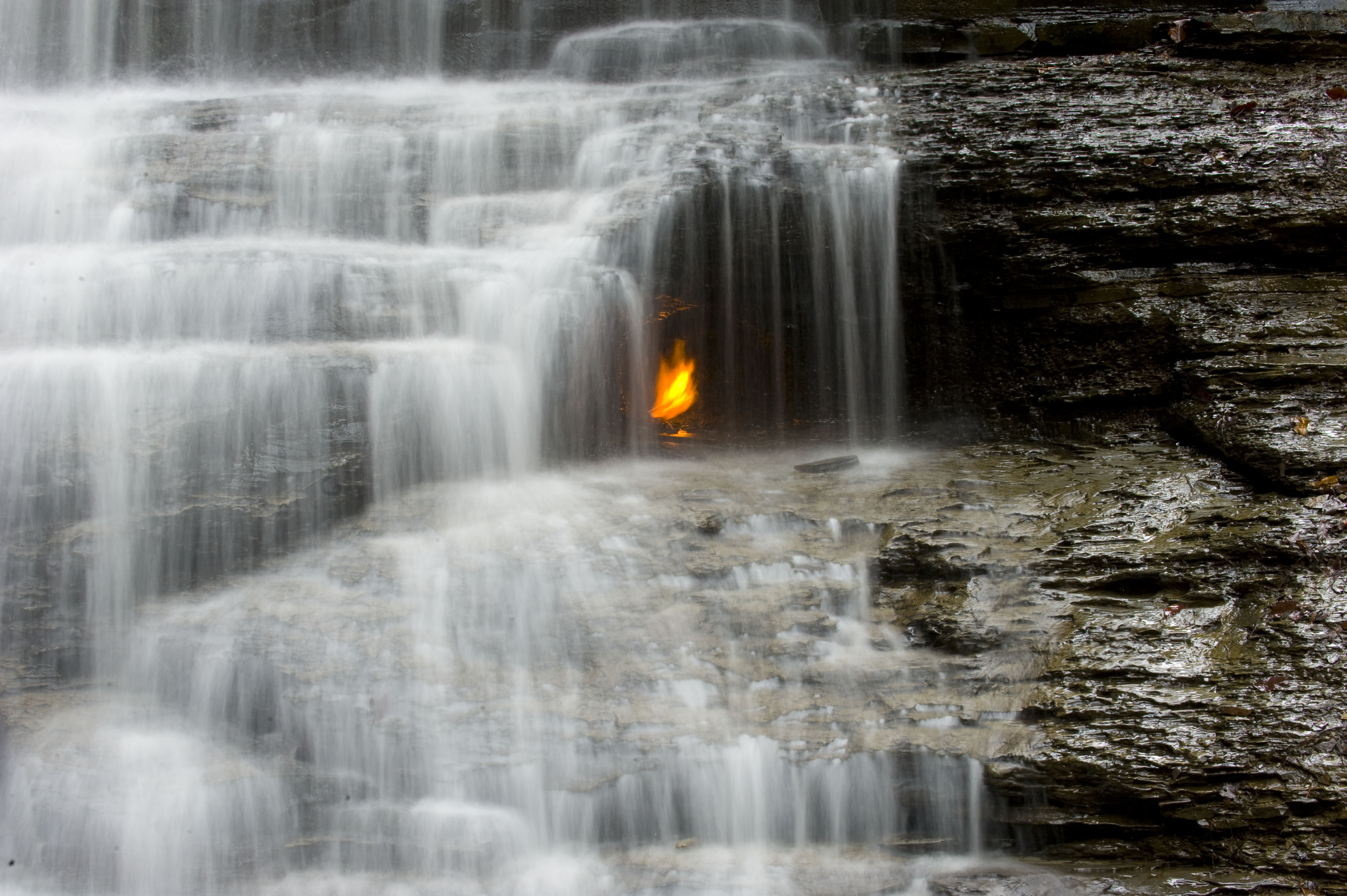
Eternal Flame Falls in Chestnut Ridge Park
