= Mount Vernon, Erie County, New York =

Hamlet in the United States

Coordinates: 42°45′14″N 78°53′26″W

Mount Vernon is a hamlet in the town of Hamburg in Erie County, New York, United States. It is located within the census-designated place of Wanakah, and is served by the Frontier Central School District.
