= Looneyville, New York =

Hamlet in New York, United States

Looneyville
- Hamlet
- Interactive map of Looneyville
- Coordinates: 42°55′51″N 78°34′41″W
- Country: United States
- State: New York
- County: Erie
- Town: Lancaster

Looneyville is a hamlet in the town of Lancaster in Erie County, New York, United States.
