= Clifton Heights, New York =

Hamlet in New York, United States

Coordinates: 42°44′09″N 78°55′00″W

Clifton Heights is a hamlet in the town of Hamburg in Erie County, New York, United States. It is located within the Wanakah census-designated place.
