= Glenwood, New York =

Hamlet in New York, United States

Coordinates: 42°37′09″N 78°39′28″W

Glenwood is a hamlet in southern Erie County, New York, United States. Straddling the Towns of Sardinia and Colden, it lies on New York State Route 240 and includes such places as Sprague Brook Park and the Kissing Bridge Ski Area.

Glenwood has two year round restaurants and a post office (zip code 14069).
