= Sprague Brook Park =

County Park in New York, USA

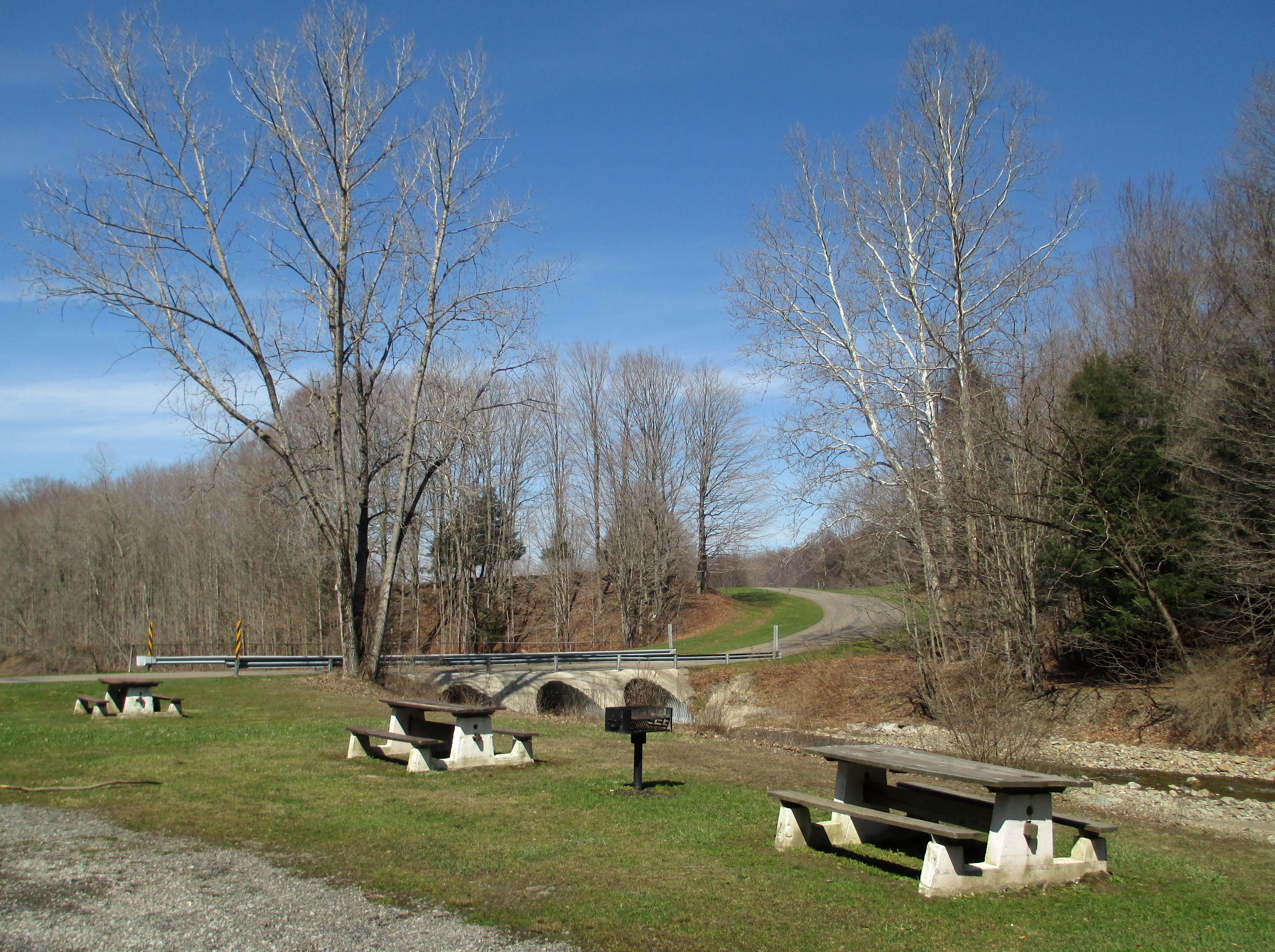
- View of a picnic area along Sprague Brook

- Location within New York
- Type: Regional park
- Location: 9674 Foote Road; Glenwood, New York
- Nearest city: Buffalo
- Coordinates: 42°35′30″N 78°37′53″W
- Area: 974 acres (3.94 km^{2})
- Created: 1963
- Operator: Erie County Department of Parks, Recreation and Forestry
- Open: All year
- Camp sites: 30 hookup, 123 total
- Website: Sprague Brook Park

Sprague Brook Park is a 974-acre (3.94 km^{2}) county park in the hamlet of Glenwood in Erie County, New York. It is operated by the Erie County Department of Parks, Recreation and Forestry, and it is the only park managed by Erie County that offers overnight camping facilities. Access to the park is free and it is open year-round.

== History ==
Much of the land that currently comprises Sprague Brook Park was obtained by Erie County in 1963 as part of a larger acquisition of 2,200 acres (8.9 km^{2}) that also included parkland near Eighteen Mile Creek, Beeman Creek (near Clarence Center), and Larkin Woods (now Franklin Gulf Park). An additional 86 acres (0.35 km^{2}) of land was purchased by the county to expand Sprague Brook Park in 1964.

== Facilities ==
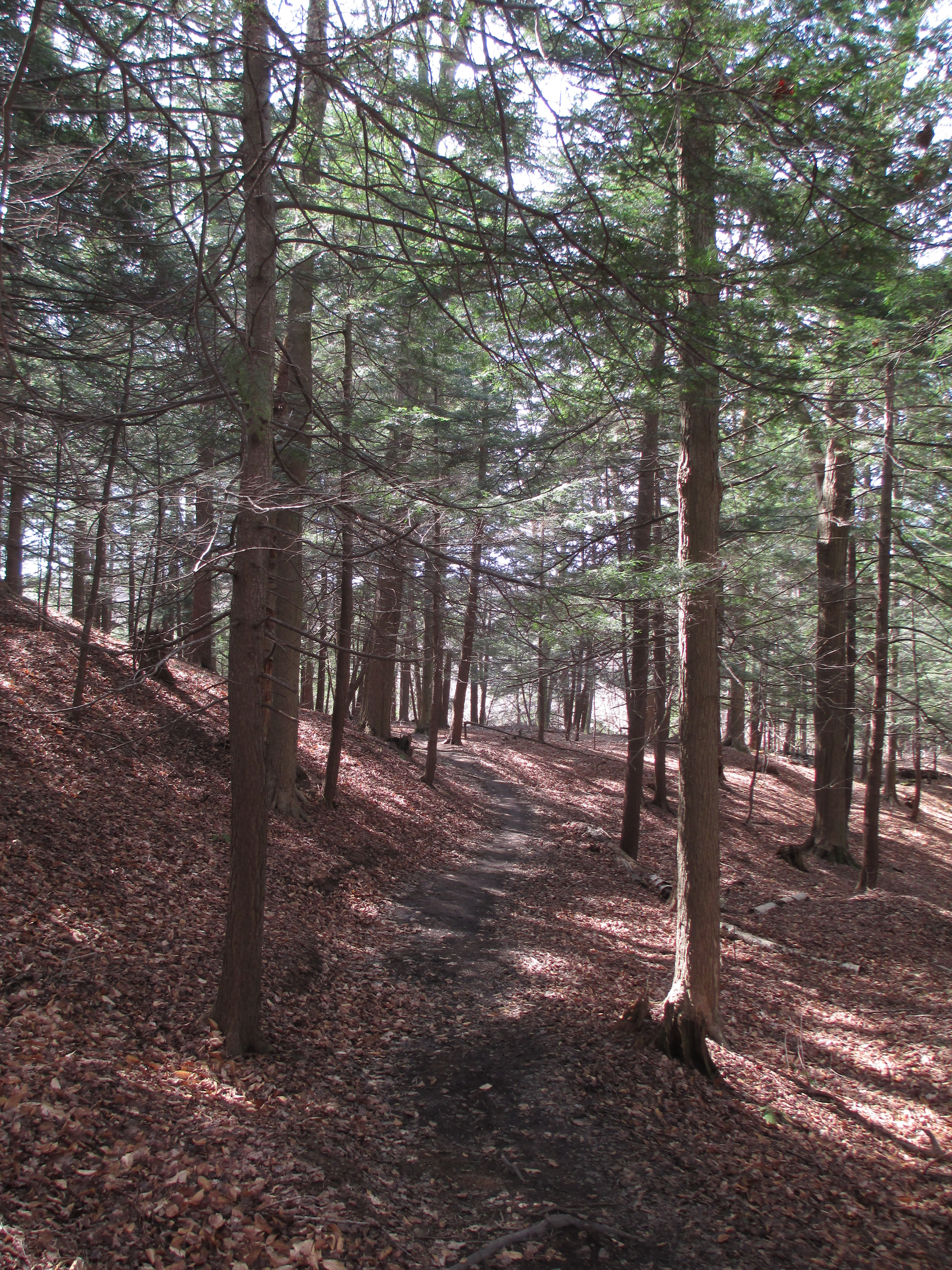
Trail through an eastern hemlock forest at Sprague Brook Park.

Sprague Brook Park has dedicated facilities for camping, baseball, softball and tennis. Several ponds offer opportunities for fishing, and a sledding hill is available for use during the winter. Trails for hiking and snowmobiling are found throughout the property. A three-mile (4.8 km) groomed cross-country skiing loop and an associated warming shelter are maintained during the winter. Several shelters are located within the park and may be reserved for events and gatherings.

The park's mountain biking trail system was expanded after proposed improvements were submitted by the Western New York Mountain Bicycling Association. These proposals were incorporated into the county's master plan for the park (released in 2003), and enacted in the following years.

Some potential future improvements outlined in the county parks' 2003 master plan include installation of scenic overlooks, development of a 'natural' hillside amphitheater, and ceasing to mow underutilized fields to allow them to undergo re-naturalization.

Electric vehicle (EV) chargers have been installed in the park.
