= Weyer, New York =

Hamlet in New York, United States

Coordinates: 42°43′42″N 78°54′57″W

Weyer is a hamlet in the town of Hamburg in Erie County, New York, United States.
