= Walden Cliffs, New York =

Hamlet in New York, United States

Coordinates: 42°43′32″N 78°57′05″W

Walden Cliffs is a hamlet in the town of Hamburg in Erie County, New York, United States.
