= Scranton, New York =

Area of Hamburg in New York, US

Coordinates: 42°44′26″N 78°50′03″W

Scranton is a hamlet in the town of Hamburg in Erie County, New York, United States. It is named after the city of Scranton, Pennsylvania.
