= Orchard Park, New York =

- Town
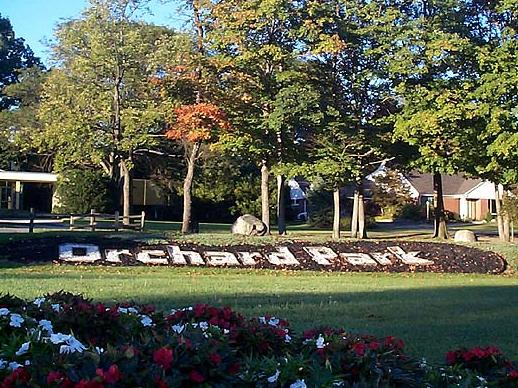
- Village of Orchard Park

- Seal

- Location in Erie County, New York

- Coordinates: 42°46′N 78°44′W
- Country: United States
- State: New York
- County: Erie County
- Incorporated: 1850
- Named after: Orchard Park

Government
  - Supervisor: Joseph Liberti

Area
  - Total: 38.52 sq mi (99.76 km^{2})
  - Land: 38.44 sq mi (99.55 km^{2})
  - Water: 0.081 sq mi (0.21 km^{2})
- Elevation: 866 ft (264 m)

Population (2020)
  - Total: 29,686 ▲
  - Density: 770.9/sq mi (297.63/km^{2})
- Time zone: UTC-5 (EST)
  - Summer (DST): UTC-4 (EDT)
- ZIP Codes: 14127 (Orchard Park); 14075 (Hamburg); 14170 (West Falls); 14218 (Lackawanna); 14224 (West Seneca)
- Area code: 716
- FIPS code: 36-029-55277
- FIPS code: 36-55277
- GNIS feature ID: 0979318
- Website: www.orchardparkny.gov

Orchard Park is an incorporated town in Erie County, New York, United States. It is an outer ring suburb southeast of Buffalo. The population was 29,686 at the 2020 census. The town contains a village also named Orchard Park. Orchard Park is one of the Southtowns of Erie County and is best known as the site of Highmark Stadium, home of the Buffalo Bills.

== History ==
In 1803, Didymus C. Kinney and his wife, Phebe Hartwell Kinney, purchased land and built a cabin in the southwest corner of the township, which has since been turned into a museum. The following year, a migration of Quaker settlers began. The town was separated from the town of Hamburg in 1850 and was first named "Ellicott", after Joseph Ellicott, an agent of the Holland Land Company. Within months, the name was changed to the town of "East Hamburgh". On March 1, 1934, the town was renamed "Orchard Park" after its principal settlement. In the early 1900s, a large fire burned down most of the central part of the village of Orchard Park around South Buffalo Street.

The Buffalo, Rochester and Pittsburgh Railroad Station and the Johnson-Jolls Complex are listed on the National Register of Historic Places.

== Geography ==
Orchard Park is located at 42°46′N 78°44′W (42.7622, −78.7414). The village of Orchard Park is 14 miles (23 km) southeast of Buffalo.

According to the U.S. Census Bureau, the town has a total area of 38.52 square miles (99.76 km^{2}), of which 38.44 square miles (99.56 km^{2}) is land and 0.08 square miles (0.21 km^{2}), or 0.21%, is water.

=== Major routes ===
US 219 passes through the west part of the town and forms junctions with US 20A (Quaker Street) and NY 179 (Milestrip Road).

US 20 (Southwestern Boulevard) passes through the north part of the town and forms a junction with NY 277 and NY 240 (Orchard Park Road).

=== Adjacent towns and cities ===
- Town of West Seneca – north
- City of Lackawanna – northwest
- Town of Hamburg – west
- Town of Boston – south
- Town of Colden – southeast
- Town of Aurora – east
- Town of Elma – northeast

== Demographics ==
Historical population
Census	Pop.	Note	%±
1860	2,136		—
1870	2,270		6.3%
1880	2,409		6.1%
1890	2,304		−4.4%
1900	2,350		2.0%
1910	2,636		12.2%
1920	3,120		18.4%
1930	4,234		35.7%
1940	5,453		28.8%
1950	8,491		55.7%
1960	15,876		87.0%
1970	19,978		25.8%
1980	24,359		21.9%
1990	24,632		1.1%
2000	27,637		12.2%
2010	29,054		5.1%
2020	29,686		2.2%
Historical Population Figures

As of the census of 2010, there were 28,272 people, 11,553 households, and 7,656 families residing in the town. The population density was 717.7 inhabitants per square mile (277.1/km^{2}). There were 10,644 housing units at an average density of 276.4 per square mile (106.7/km^{2}). The racial makeup of the town was 97.9% White, 0.5% Black or African American, 0.2% Native American, 0.9% Asian, <0.1% Pacific Islander, 0.2% from other races, and 0.6% from two or more races. Hispanic or Latino of any race were 1.0% of the population.

There were 10,277 households, out of which 33.7% had children under the age of 18 living with them, 64.3% were married couples living together, 7.6% had a female householder with no husband present, and 25.5% were non-families. 22.1% of all households were made up of individuals, and 10.3% had someone living alone who was 65 years of age or older. The average household size was 2.62 and the average family size was 3.09.

In the town, the population was spread out, with 25.2% under the age of 18, 5.7% from 18 to 24, 25.6% from 25 to 44, 26.8% from 45 to 64, and 16.6% who were 65 years of age or older. The median age was 41 years. For every 100 females, there were 92.6 males. For every 100 females age 18 and over, there were 87.7 males.

The median income for a household in the town was $100,575, and the median income for a family was $112,906. About 1.1% of families and 2.4% of the population were below the poverty line.

== Government ==
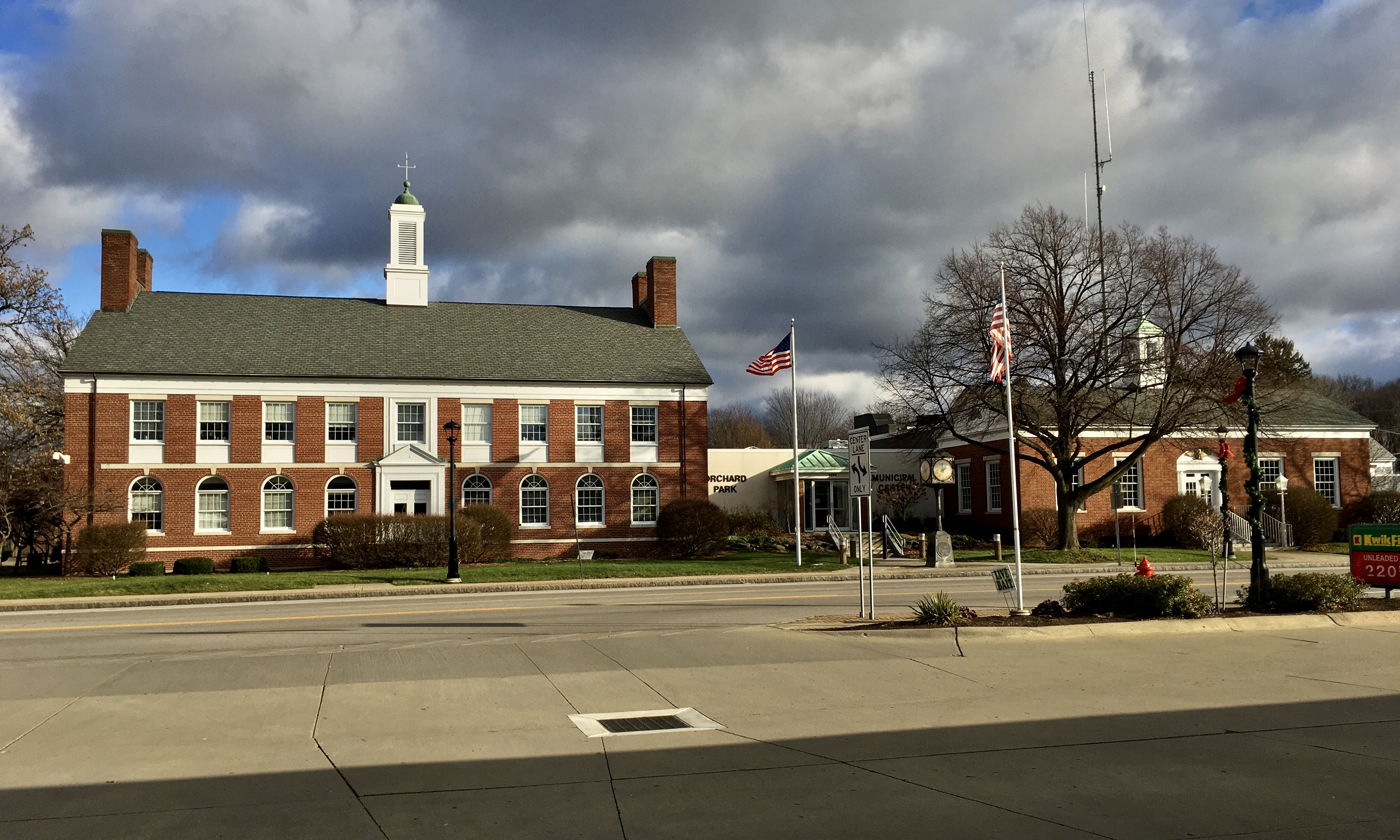
Orchard Park Municipal Center

The town of Orchard Park has a supervisor-council form of government. Elected at large positions are Supervisor, Council Member, Clerk, Highway Superintendent and Town Justice. Other appointed positions are Town Attorney and Deputy Attorney, Engineer, Assessor, Building Inspector, Recreation and Youth Services Director and Chief of Police.

=== Supervisors ===
==== Town of Orchard Park ====
- Joseph Liberti

(2026–Present)

- Scott Honer

(2026–Present) Deputy Supervisor

- Eugene Majchrzak (2022–2025)
- Joseph Liberti (2020–2021) Served as the Deputy Supervisor w/o voting power
- Dr. Patrick J. Keem (2014–2020) (resigned)
- Janis Colarusso (2010–2013)
- Mary Travers Murphy (2006–2009)
- Toni M. Cudney (1998–2005)
- Dennis J. Mill (1989–1997)
- Eugene B. Woodard (1968–1989)
- Clarence F. Henning (1949–1967)
- Melvin L. Bong (1938–1948)
- Jacob C. Newton (1932–1937)

==== Town of East Hamburgh ====
- Clinton Ebenezer Holmes (1923–1931)
- Frank F. Holmwood (1900–1922)

== Communities ==
- Armor – A hamlet at the west town line.
- Duells Corner – A hamlet south of Orchard Park village.
- Ellicott – A hamlet south of Orchard Park village.
- Loveland – A hamlet on the east town line.
- Village of Orchard Park – A village located at the junction of Routes 240 and U.S. 20A.
- Webster Corners – A hamlet north of the village of Orchard Park by the intersection of Webster and Orchard Park Roads.

== Notable places ==
- Buffalo, Rochester and Pittsburgh Railroad Station – A former railroad station listed on the National Register of Historic Places.
- Chestnut Ridge Park – A popular county park with a wide range of activities, located in the south section of the town on Chestnut Ridge Road (Route 277).
- Highmark Stadium – The home stadium of the NFL's Buffalo Bills lies on the western edge of the town in the hamlet of Windom.
- SUNY Erie – The official location of the south campus, although most of the campus is in the adjacent town of Hamburg.
- Chestnut Ridge Park, the largest park in Erie County, is located in the southern end of the town.
- The Eternal Flame Falls is a small waterfall located in the Shale Creek Preserve, a section of Chestnut Ridge Park.

== Education ==
The Orchard Park Central School District operates four K-5 elementary schools (Eggert, Ellicott, South Davis, and Windom), Orchard Park Middle School, and Orchard Park High School. The mascot for the Orchard Park's athletic teams is a Quaker.

Bryant & Stratton College is in Orchard Park.

Erie Community College (ECC) is at the western town line.

Orchard Park has two private, Catholic schools (under the Roman Catholic Diocese of Buffalo), Nativity and St. John Vianney. Our Lady of the Sacred Heart (pre-k through 8), closed in 2014 after exhaustive research conducted by the Diocese of Buffalo on demographics, finances and educational relevance.

== Culture ==
=== Art ===
The annual Orchard Park Festival of the Arts, an outdoor art and craft show, is held each year on the third weekend of September, on the campus of Orchard Park Middle School. It is sponsored by the Orchard Park Chamber of Commerce. It was organized as the Quaker Arts Festival in the 1960s by Orchard Parkers John Coleman of The Suburban Press and Chet Seymour of the Orchard Park Presbyterian Church, and was originally held on the grounds of the Orchard Park Presbyterian Church. It was run by the Orchard Park Jaycees from 1963 to 2017.

=== Music ===
Since 1985, under the direction of the Orchard Park Council of the Arts, local businesses and the town of Orchard Park sponsor free outdoor musical entertainment throughout the summer at the pavilion bandstand on the grounds of the middle school.

Organized in 1949, the Orchard Park Symphony Orchestra, composed of more than 70 volunteer musicians, performs four regular concerts each year in the high school auditorium.

The Orchard Park Chorale was founded in 1975 under the sponsorship of the Adult Education Program of the Orchard Park School District. Its more than fifty singers perform regularly at the Orchard Park Presbyterian Church.

=== Sports ===
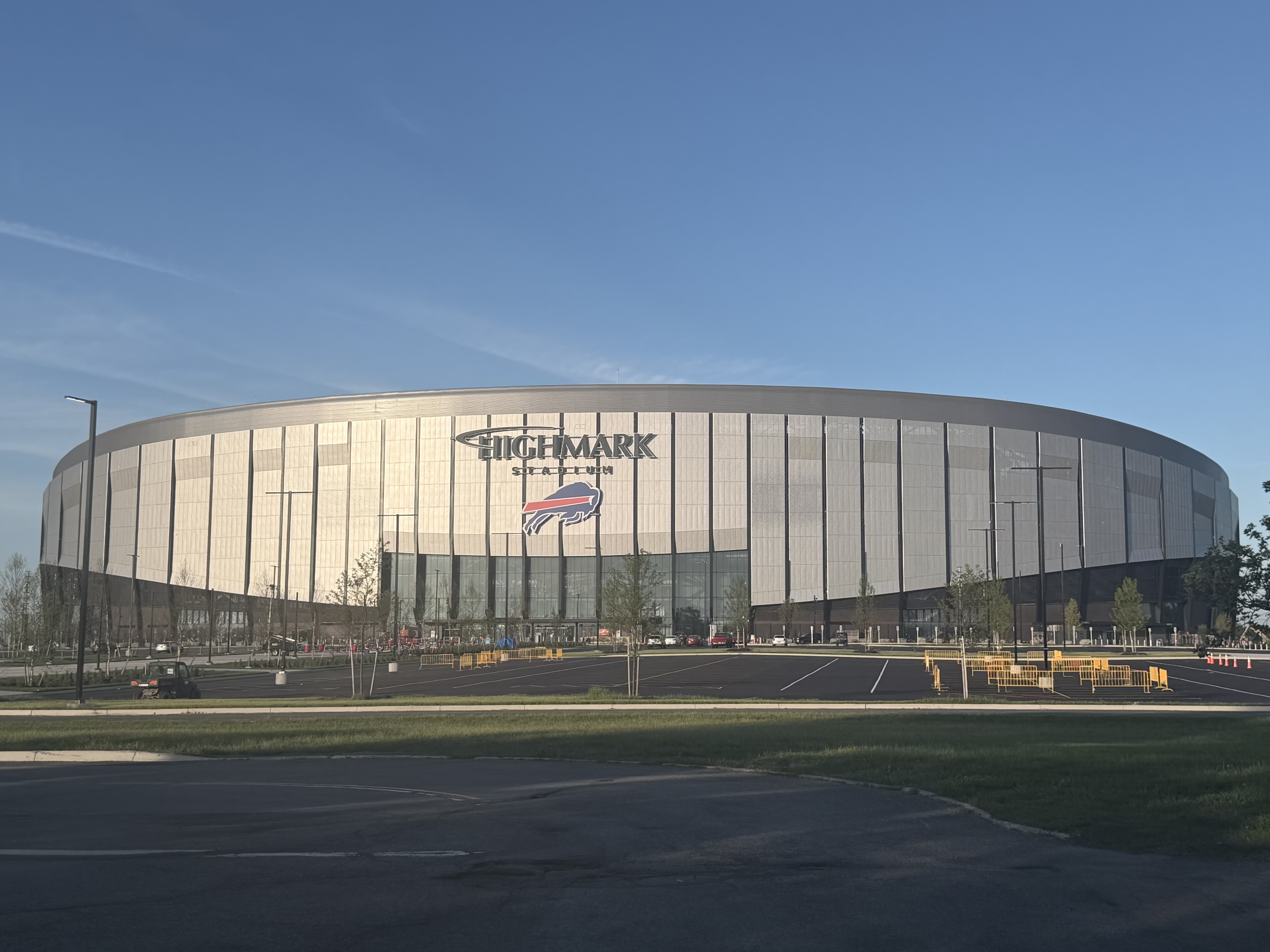
Highmark Stadium in May 2026

- Highmark Stadium, the current home stadiums of the NFL's Buffalo Bills, is located in Orchard Park.
- West Herr Field, the home stadium of Erie Community College's football team, is located in Orchard Park adjacent to Highmark Stadium.
- The Orchard Park High School football team won the 2008 and 2011 New York State Public High School Class AA Championship.
- The Orchard Park High School baseball team won the 1988 State Championship.
- The Orchard Park High School volleyball team won the 2008 New York State Championship.
- The 1993 and 1994 Orchard Park Little League Baseball team won the New York State Championship. They recently won five Section titles in three summers with one team winning three in the10U, 11U, and 12U divisions.

== Media ==
=== Print newspapers ===
- The Orchard Park Bee, a weekly newspaper

== Notable people ==
=== Business and industry ===
- John Koelmel, board chairman at Kaleida Health and chairman of the New York Power Authority

=== Entertainers and actors ===
- John Gurtler, sportscaster
- Eric Herman, children's music entertainer
- Rick James (1948–2004), musician
- Brooke Lauren, film and TV producer
- John Murphy, play-by-play announcer for the Buffalo Bills
- Danny Neaverth, disc jockey and TV personality
- William Sadler, actor; Saturn Award winner
- Hailee Steinfeld, actor and singer

=== Sports ===
- Josh Allen, quarterback for the Buffalo Bills
- Brandon Beane, general manager of the Buffalo Bills
- Jim Burt, former NFL nose tackle for the San Francisco 49ers and New York Giants
- Wray Carlton, former AFL halfback with the Buffalo Bills who scored the first-ever touchdown for the Bills
- Jon Corto, former Buffalo Bills player
- Brian Dux, former professional basketball player
- Patrick Emerling, racing driver
- Dave Hollins, former Major League baseball player (Phillies, Twins, Mariners)
- Jim Kelly, former quarterback for the Buffalo Bills and member of the Pro Football Hall of Fame
- Lex Luger a.k.a. Lawrence ("Larry") Wendell Pfohl, former professional wrestler
- Travis Mayer, Olympic silver medalist in freestyle skiing
- Sean McDermott, head coach of the Buffalo Bills
- Von Miller, NFL outside linebacker for the Buffalo Bills
- Brian Moorman, former NFL punter for the Buffalo Bills
- Lonnie Nielsen, professional golfer
- Ron Pitts, former NFL player
- Josh Thomas, defensive end for the NFL Indianapolis Colts
- Craig Wolfley, former NFL offensive lineman for the Pittsburgh Steelers and Minnesota Vikings
- Ron Wolfley, former NFL fullback for the Arizona Cardinals and Cleveland Browns, current radio analyst for Arizona Cardinals

=== Religion, charities, social advocacy ===
- Mary Travers Murphy, executive director of the Family Justice Center of Erie County
- Robert Stearns, an American pastor and Evangelical Christian leader
