= Water Valley, New York =

Hamlet in New York, United States

Coordinates: 42°42′20″N 78°51′00″W

Water Valley is a hamlet in the town of Hamburg in Erie County, New York, United States.
