= Wanakah, New York =

- Census-designated place
- Location in Erie County and the state of New York.

- Location in the United States
- Coordinates: 42°44′46″N 78°54′11″W
- Country: United States
- State: New York
- County: Erie
- Town: Hamburg

Area
  - Total: 1.20 sq mi (3.12 km^{2})
  - Land: 1.20 sq mi (3.12 km^{2})
  - Water: 0 sq mi (0.00 km^{2})
- Elevation: 590 ft (180 m)

Population (2020)
  - Total: 3,137
  - Density: 2,604.6/sq mi (1,005.64/km^{2})
- Time zone: UTC-5 (Eastern (EST))
  - Summer (DST): UTC-4 (EDT)
- ZIP Codes: 14075 (Hamburg); 14085 (Lake View)
- Area code: 716
- FIPS code: 36-78124
- GNIS feature ID: 0968754

Wanakah is a hamlet (and census-designated place) in the town of Hamburg in Erie County, New York, United States. As of the 2020 census, Wanakah had a population of 3,137.

Wanakah is part of the Buffalo–Niagara Falls metropolitan statistical area.

== Geography ==
Wanakah is located in the western part of the town of Hamburg, on the shore of Lake Erie. The Wanakah CDP encompasses the hamlets of Wanakah, Mount Vernon and Clifton Heights. New York State Route 5 (Lake Shore Road) is the main road through the CDP, leading northeast to Lackawanna and Buffalo and southwest towards Angola.

According to the United States Census Bureau, the CDP has a total area of 1.2 square miles (3.1 km^{2}), all land.

== Demographics ==
Historical population
| Census | Pop. | Note | %± |
|---|---|---|---|
| 2020 | 3,137 | | — |
U.S. Decennial Census

=== 2020 census ===
As of the 2020 census, Wanakah had a population of 3,137. The median age was 45.9 years. 18.9% of residents were under the age of 18 and 22.6% of residents were 65 years of age or older. For every 100 females there were 93.6 males, and for every 100 females age 18 and over there were 89.4 males age 18 and over.

100.0% of residents lived in urban areas, while 0.0% lived in rural areas.

There were 1,296 households in Wanakah, of which 20.4% had children under the age of 18 living in them. Of all households, 51.9% were married-couple households, 15.0% were households with a male householder and no spouse or partner present, and 26.5% were households with a female householder and no spouse or partner present. About 27.9% of all households were made up of individuals and 14.2% had someone living alone who was 65 years of age or older.

There were 1,377 housing units, of which 5.9% were vacant. The homeowner vacancy rate was 1.4% and the rental vacancy rate was 8.6%.

Racial composition as of the 2020 census
| Race | Number | Percent |
|---|---|---|
| White | 2,860 | 91.2% |
| Black or African American | 12 | 0.4% |
| American Indian and Alaska Native | 18 | 0.6% |
| Asian | 22 | 0.7% |
| Native Hawaiian and Other Pacific Islander | 0 | 0.0% |
| Some other race | 38 | 1.2% |
| Two or more races | 187 | 6.0% |
| Hispanic or Latino (of any race) | 107 | 3.4% |
