= Buffalo, Rochester and Pittsburgh Railroad Station =

Buffalo, Rochester and Pittsburgh Railroad Station may mean:

- Buffalo, Rochester and Pittsburgh Railroad Station (Springville, New York)
- Buffalo, Rochester and Pittsburgh Railway Station (Orchard Park, New York)
- Buffalo, Rochester & Pittsburgh Railway Indiana Passenger Station, Indiana, Pennsylvania
