= Buffalo station =

Buffalo station could refer to:

- Buffalo–Exchange Street station, a train station in Buffalo, New York, US
- Buffalo–Depew station, a train station in Depew, New York, US
- Buffalo Central Terminal, a historic former railroad station in Buffalo, New York, US
- Buffalo Grove station, a commuter station in Buffalo Grove, Illinois, US
- Buffalo railway station, a former railway station in South Gippsland, Victoria, Canada
- Lackawanna Terminal (Buffalo, New York), a former railroad station in Buffalo, New York, US
- Lehigh Valley Terminal, a demolished train station in Buffalo, New York, US
- New Buffalo station, a train station in New Buffalo, Michigan, US

== See also ==
- Buffalo AirStation, a series of wireless LAN equipment
- Buffalo, Rochester and Pittsburgh Railroad Station (disambiguation)
