= Indiana station =

Indiana station may refer to:

- Indiana station (CTA) in Chicago, Illinois, United States
- Indiana station (Los Angeles Metro) in Los Angeles, California, United States
- Indiana station (Pennsylvania) in Indiana, Pennsylvania, United States
