= Buffalo, Rochester and Pittsburgh Railway =

Railway line in the eastern United States

Overview
- Locale: New York and Pennsylvania
- Dates of operation: 1885; 141 years ago – 1932; 94 years ago
- Predecessor: Rochester and Pittsburgh Railroad
- Successor: Baltimore and Ohio Railroad

The Buffalo, Rochester, and Pittsburgh Railway (reporting mark BR&P) was one of the more than ten thousand railroad companies founded in North America. It lasted much longer than most, serving communities from the shore of Lake Ontario to the center of western Pennsylvania.

== Purpose ==
The proposed BR&P route in 1907

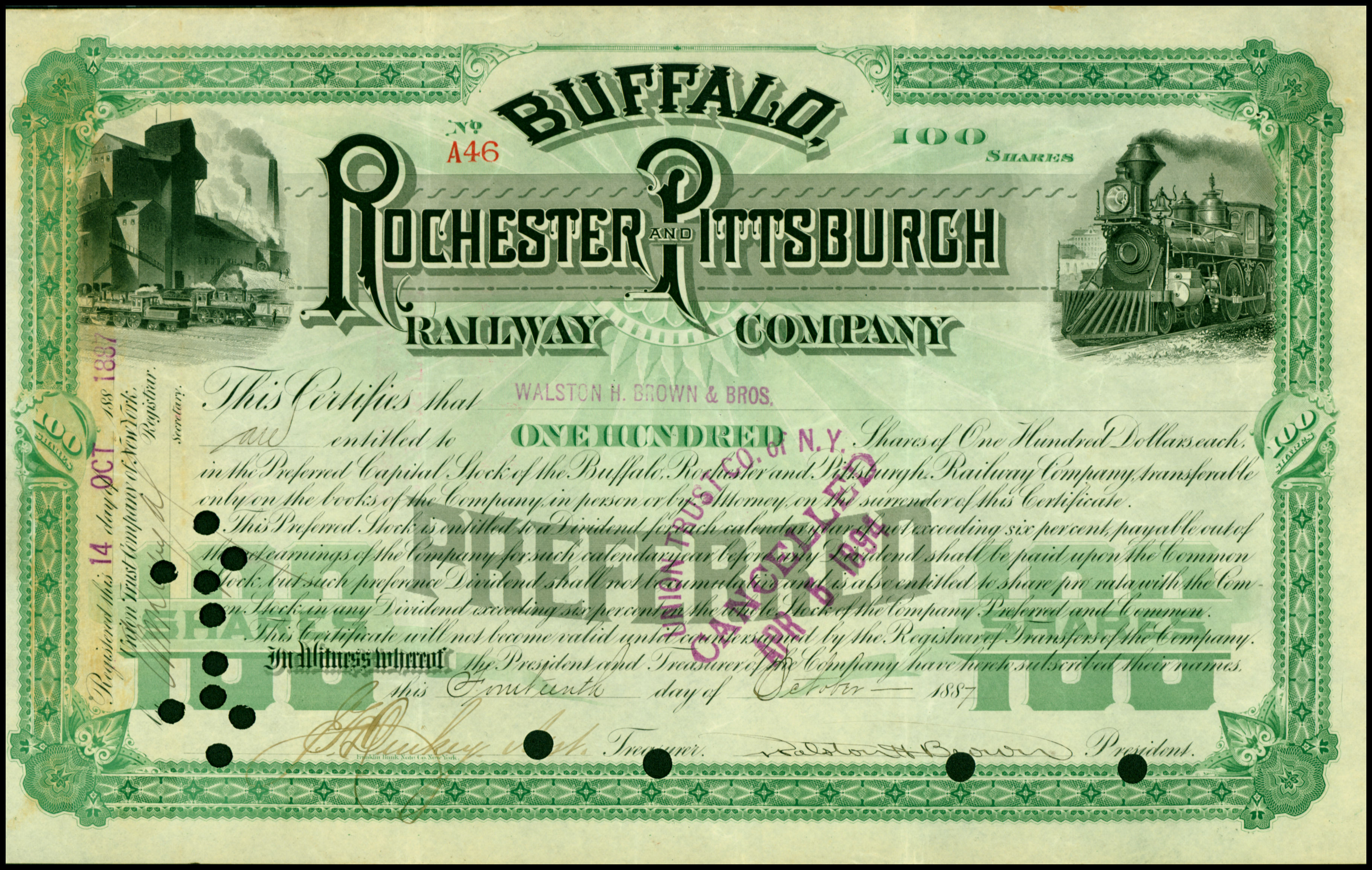
Share of the Buffalo, Rochester and Pittsburgh Railway Company, issued 15. October 1887

By the middle of the 19th century, American industry had found the means of both utilizing the bituminous coal of western Pennsylvania and transporting it economically from the mines to those who needed it. (Note: That is to say, the technology had been proved. It had not yet been implemented.) Initially, this meant steam power, in both the railroad locomotives and the factories. The immediate consequence was the need for a railroad line to haul coal from the hills of Pennsylvania to the cities of Rochester and Buffalo as well as the smaller towns and villages. The needs of the latter motivated them to invest, both individually and municipally, in the new rail companies that arose almost as profusely as spring flowers.

In the simplest terms, the Buffalo, Rochester, and Pittsburgh Railway was required to pick up precisely what the Rochester and State Line Railroad and the Rochester and Pittsburgh Railroad had dropped, the coal-hauling market between the coalfields of western Pennsylvania and the cities of Buffalo and Rochester. The mines produced steam coal, and the factories and the railroads of the Northeast needed it, in vast amounts. The reality, however, was far less simple. The great need of the coal-transportation market attracted aggressive competitors, and the laissez-faire environment of the day encouraged tactics that included paper railroads, buying and selling of corporations as though they were used cars, and financial manipulation by syndicates of investors.

For Buffalo, existing coal transportation was limited to lake boats; for Rochester, the canals and the east-west railroads. These bottlenecks caused fuel shortages which, in turn, led to the development of such paper railroads as the Buffalo and Pittsburgh Railroad (Note: This road was organized in 1852 and is not related to the present company of the same name.) as well as the Attica and Allegheny Valley, (Note: Along with many other planned railroads, this one was not built. The Arcade and Attica Railroad now occupies the northern part of the proposed route.) in the same year. The Rochester and Genesee Valley Railroad was another scheme, although this one was actually built, to a degree.

In Rochester, both the seasonality of the Erie Canal (Note: In winter, coal prices would rise significantly.) and the near monopoly of the Erie Railroad (Note: This was blamed for the price of coal tripling during the mid-1860s.) intensified the pressure for a new railroad running through to the coalfields. Another failed attempt to resolve this saw the also-never-built Rochester and Pittsburgh (Note: Not the company of the same name which was organized in 1881.) in 1853. Another line which was partially built but never reached Pennsylvania was the three-foot-gauge Rochester, Nunda, and Pennsylvania. (Note: This line operated between Mt Morris and Swain, with at least a graded railbed as far as Angelica.) (Note: The name of this town is pronounced "nun-day".)

By 1869, much money had been spent, most of it to no good purpose, and many words had been uttered and printed, but there was still no efficient, reliable, all-weather route for the coal.

== Genesis ==
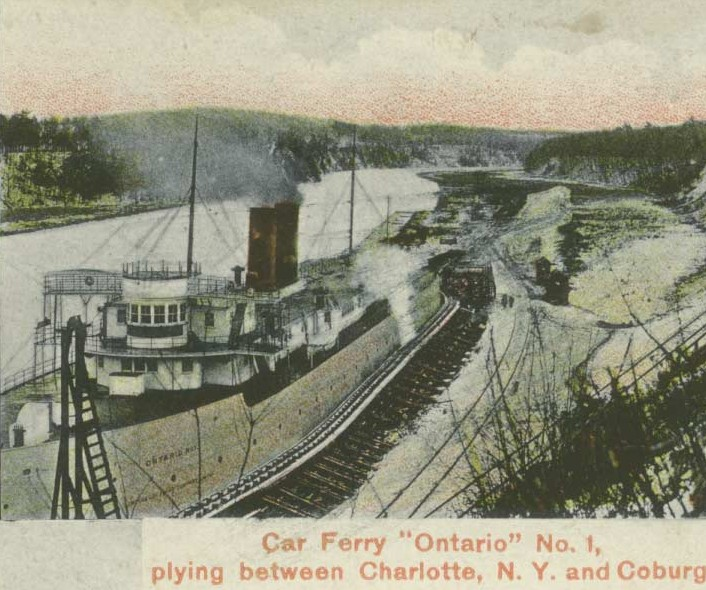
With the Grand Trunk Railway of Canada, the BR&P operated the lake ferry, Ontario I, seen here docked at Charlotte, circa 1907

Although probably mythical, there's a story that the Mumford merchant, Oliver Allen, arose from a dinner with some fellow businessmen at which the need for a new railroad had been the topic of a spirited discussion and exclaimed, "Let's build a railroad." Allen did not build the road himself, but his was the drive that led to the Rochester and State Line Railroad.

The Rochester and Pittsburgh Railroad Company was born on 29 January 1881 from the remains of the R&SL. The latter had been sold on 20 January for $600,000 to a New York syndicate of investors led by Walston H Brown. Brown, of Brown, Howard, and Company, had experience in railroad building; his company typified the many financial speculators and investment organizations which dealt in railroad companies and their securities. Another investment company to figure prominently in the BR&P history was that of Adrian Iselin. Ab initio, these investors planned expansion into the lucrative coal-haulage market. The source of the coal had by this time expanded south through western Pennsylvania into the Beech Tree area between Brockwayville and DuBois.

In a practice typical in the industry, so-called "construction companies" were formed. They were paper railroads (Note: While some of them never got off the paper, as it were, others did actual building before their intentionally brief lives ended.) intended for the actual building of new lines and branches but not permanent existence operating them. Thus, the Buffalo, Rochester and Pittsburgh Railroad Company, the Great Valley and Bradford Railroad, the Bradford and State Line Railroad, and the Pittsburgh and New York Railroad built their respective lines, and then the latter three companies were folded back into the Rochester and Pittsburgh in November 1881.

The R&P purchased the Pitkin Building on Main Street West and Oak Street in Rochester and added a two-story Gothic structure to it. The board then hired a highly qualified manager in George E Merchant, who had excelled as a division superintendent for the Chicago, Milwaukee, St Paul, and Pacific. Among the issues he faced upon beginning work in the head office in Rochester were several pending lawsuits against the R&SL and disputes arising from the shady land acquisition practices of the company's forebear. (Note: The Rochester and State Line Railroad had, in some instances, built their tracks across land that they did not yet own.) Resolving these, he proceeded to improve the capital plant, including refurbishing the older locomotives and buying new ones. He bought more 4-4-0 Brooks engines, as well as a number of 2-8-0 Consolidations. Line construction absorbed considerable resources as well. (Note: In an incident in 1882, the R&P built a line across the narrow-gauge Olean, Bradford, and Warren without first asking permission. When the OB&W declined the R&P's terms for an agreement, the R&P went ahead with the construction anyway. The irate OB&W crew then hooked a locomotive to the trestle works and started to pull it down. Intervention by the local police kept the resulting brawl from becoming serious. The two companies eventually came to an agreement at least non-violent if not altogether amicable.)

In 1882, through its subsidiary, the Buffalo, Rochester and Pittsburgh Railroad, it extended its trackage south from Salamanca to reach the coal fields of Pennsylvania. To accomplish this required bridging the Kinzua Creek Gorge. The R&P used what was, for the time, the world's highest railroad bridge. Built by the New York, Lake Erie, and Western Railroad and Coal Company, the structure was more than 300 feet (91 m) above the creek and more than 2,000 feet (610 m) long. Construction took only ninety-four days. The single track over the bridge was shared by the Erie and the R&P; this proved to be a bottleneck, and the company which succeeded the Rochester and Pittsburgh Railroad Company, the Buffalo, Rochester and Pittsburgh Railway, built a forty-mile detour, opening it in 1893.

While the R&P was expanding on its south side, it also built on the north end. Using the Rochester and Charlotte, (Note: Technically, this company never built anything. Organized on 21 April 1881 for the purpose of constructing a line from the R&P at Lincoln Park to the lake at Charlotte (the mouth of the Genesee River), it instead abandoned its proposed route in a deal struck with the New York Central and Hudson River on 1 May 1882 and extended to May 1886, by which time, of course, the R&P had disappeared. The BR&P did build this route, using the Lincoln Park and Charlotte Railroad.) the Buffalo, Rochester and Pittsburgh, (Note: Its point of departure from the R&P main line was a spot in the town of Ashford. It was created on 18 August 1881 by the Rochester and Pittsburgh Railroad for the purpose of extending its line north from Machias to Buffalo. In the event, this route started not at Machias but at Ashford, the result of which was Ashford Junction. On 28 September 1881, this company and the paper-only Rochester and Charlotte Railroad were merged into the Rochester and Pittsburgh.) and the Perry Railroad (Note: A modest undertaking organized on 9 May 1882 to build a one mile (1.6 km) long connection between the existing short line at Silver Springs and the R&P main line at Silver Lake Junction, the Perry Railroad was taken back into the R&P on 17 November 1883.) as construction companies, it brought much greater capability to the old RS&L yard at Lincoln Park and extended its line to the coal pier on the Genesee River at Lake Ontario (Charlotte).

Succumbing to over-expansion, (Note: The railroad historian, Paul Pietrak, suggests(page 35) that the Rochester and Pittsburgh Railroad Company was, in essence, nothing more than a vast construction company for the Buffalo, Rochester and Pittsburgh Railway.) the R&P went bankrupt in May 1885 after existing less than four years. (Note: 20 January 1881 through 16 October 1885.)

The vigorous expansion of the railroad, including land acquisition, the employment of literally thousands of laborers, and the purchase of locomotives and freight and passenger cars, placed upon the Rochester and Pittsburgh a burden that its revenue and capitalization could not sustain. On 30 May 1885, the Supreme Court appointed a referee to whom it gave the authority to sell off the company's assets. The foreclosure had been forced by the Union Trust Company of New York City. On 16 October 1885, Adrian Iselin bought the remains of the R&P.

That October, it emerged in the form of a new company called the Buffalo, Rochester and Pittsburgh Railway, a name which accurately reflected the physical reality of its route structure. One of the forces at work in the reorganization which engendered the BR&P was a Rochester coal merchant named Arthur Yates. Not coincidentally, Yates was the line's biggest coal shipper.

== Locomotives ==
Buffalo, Rochester and Pittsburgh Railway power

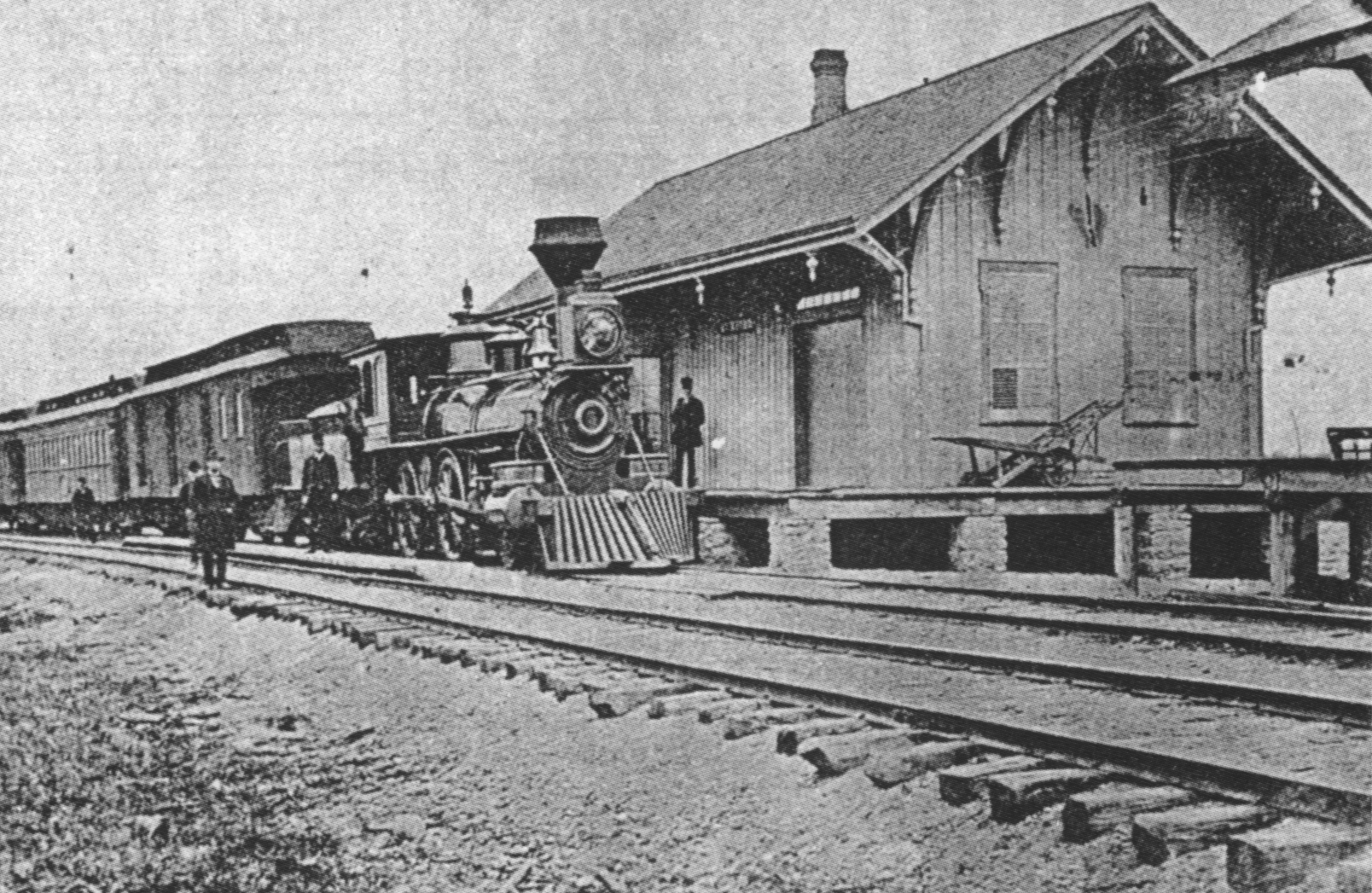
Rochester and Pittsburgh 4-4-0 "American" at the Mumford station

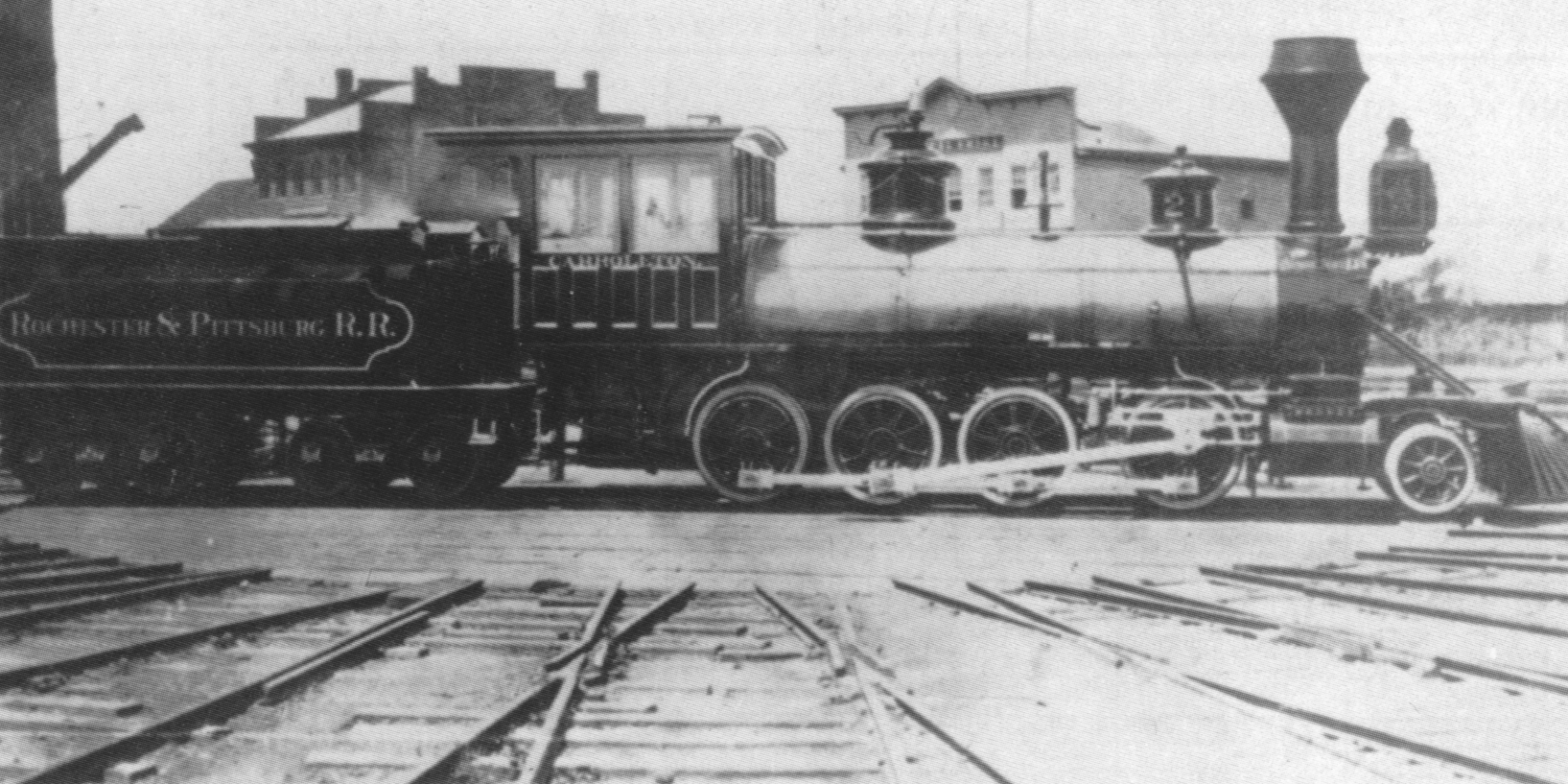
Rochester and Pittsburgh 2-8-0 locomotive, the "Carrollton", on the Salamanca turntable

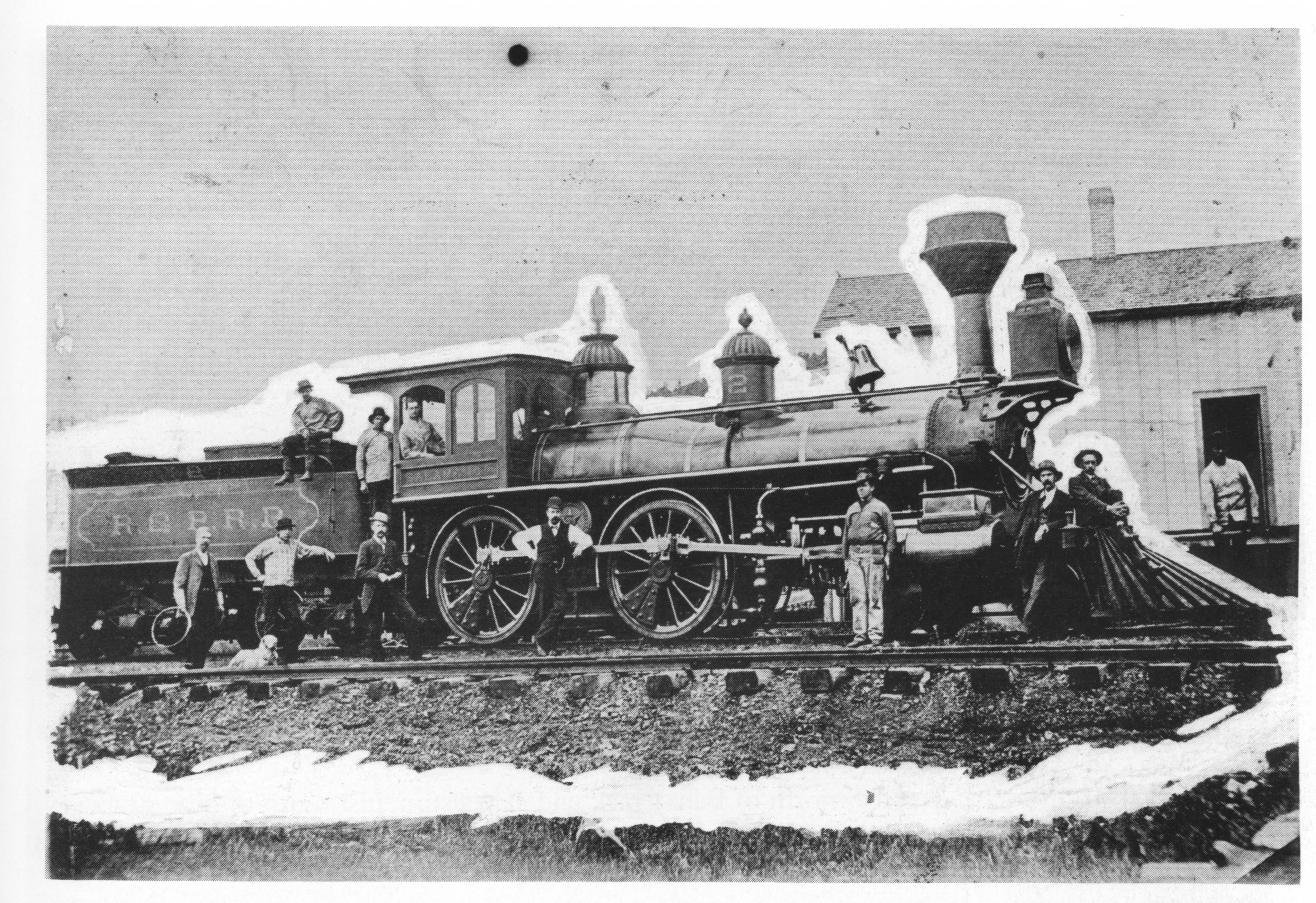
Rochester and Pittsburgh Engine 2, the "Salamanca", originally built in 1873 for the Rochester and State Line, photographed in 1881 in Salamanca

The power used by the Buffalo, Rochester and Pittsburgh Railway had a broader range than that of most Eastern roads of the steam era. From a tiny two-foot-gauge 0-4-0 switcher used in their cross-tie factory (Note: This plant, in Bradford, impregnated ties and bridge timbers with preservative.) and the eleven Brooks-built "American" style 4-4-0 engines inherited from the Rochester and State Line Railroad to the massive Alco 2-6-6-2 and 2-8-8-2 Mallets used as pushers at the notorious Clarion Hill, (Note: This is a grade on the south side of the Big Level near Kinzua on Clarion Hill. Eleven miles long between Clarion Junction and J&B Junction (at 2,216 ft), it rises northbound at 58 feet (18 m) to the mile.) the BR&P ran engines that were well maintained and in which crews took justifiable pride. By the time the Rochester and Pittsburgh had inherited the R&SL motive power, the original eleven had aged quickly, the RS&L having spent little on maintenance. The R&P had to send the locomotives back to Brooks for rebuilding in 1881. By the end of 1881, the company had a total of sixteen locomotives, all of them Brooks 4-4-0s.

With the advent of the R&P came expansion into the hills of Pennsylvania, and that meant heavier and more powerful engines. In 1881, five Consolidation 2-8-0s were added to the roster, with another fifteen early in 1882. In 1883, another fifteen were acquired, along with four more 4-4-0s. The next type procured was the 0-6-0 switcher, as well as more Consolidations. By 1884, the R&P was operating 60 engines, and this represented the extent of the R&P's locomotive inventory.

From the inception of the BR&P, the company purchased locomotives as the need for them arose and then maintained them well. Some of these engines were used for both passenger and freight service, but many fell into one category or the other. Since the BR&P came to an end in 1932, it remained a steam-only railroad, with some of its locomotives serving the B&O through the 1950s.

=== Freight engines ===
While the BR&P simply purchased the great majority of its locomotives, several were acquired by means of leases when the company faced a serious but temporary shortfall, while others came to the BR&P through subsidiary companies, such as the Allegheny and Western Railroad, the Silver Lake Railway, (Note: The two locomotives acquired when this road was absorbed in 1910 promptly disappeared from the historical record. The presumption is that they were taken to Lincoln Park and sold, but it is unknown where they went.) the Rural Valley Railroad, and the Clearfield and Mahoning. Although the first engines were all Brooks, that shop's inability to keep up with demand led to the first BR&P purchase being made at Baldwin Locomotive Works.

Hauling coal was the company's trade, and coal cars are heavy. Some of the consists at the time ranged from 2,175 tons to 3,700 tons. The semi-mountainous terrain of western Pennsylvania demanded enormous pulling (and pushing) capability, and even the 250-ton 2-6-6-2s were often doubled up.

=== Passenger engines ===
Although the BR&P was not a passenger line, it put a first-class effort into the passenger service that it provided the public. The locomotives used represented the best available, as did the care given these engines, leading to an enviable record for on-time completion of trips.

The first passenger service was hauled by special Brooks 4-6-0 engines acquired in 1898 and dedicated to passenger trains. Larger than the then-standard 4-4-0 Brooks, these engines were the pride of the company. In 1901, they were supplanted by the more-capable 4-4-2 Atlantics. The last of these came on board in 1909. The Atlantic class was fast (Note: The mechanical nature of a steam locomotive makes it increasingly susceptible to breakdown as its operating speed is increased.) and capable when coupled to a three-car train.

As train length was increased and heavier steel cars replaced the wood cars, the Atlantics were, in turn, replaced by the heavier 4-6-2 Pacifics, which lasted until the B&O ended passenger service in 1955. The BR&P owned a total of 22 Pacifics, acquisition ranging from 1912 to 1923. Used widely by railroads throughout the country, it proved popular and reliable. The Pacific was built in several weights, with the lighter numbers 675 to 679 Brooks engines known by the crews as the "sport model".

== Stations ==
Buffalo, Rochester and Pittsburgh Railway stations

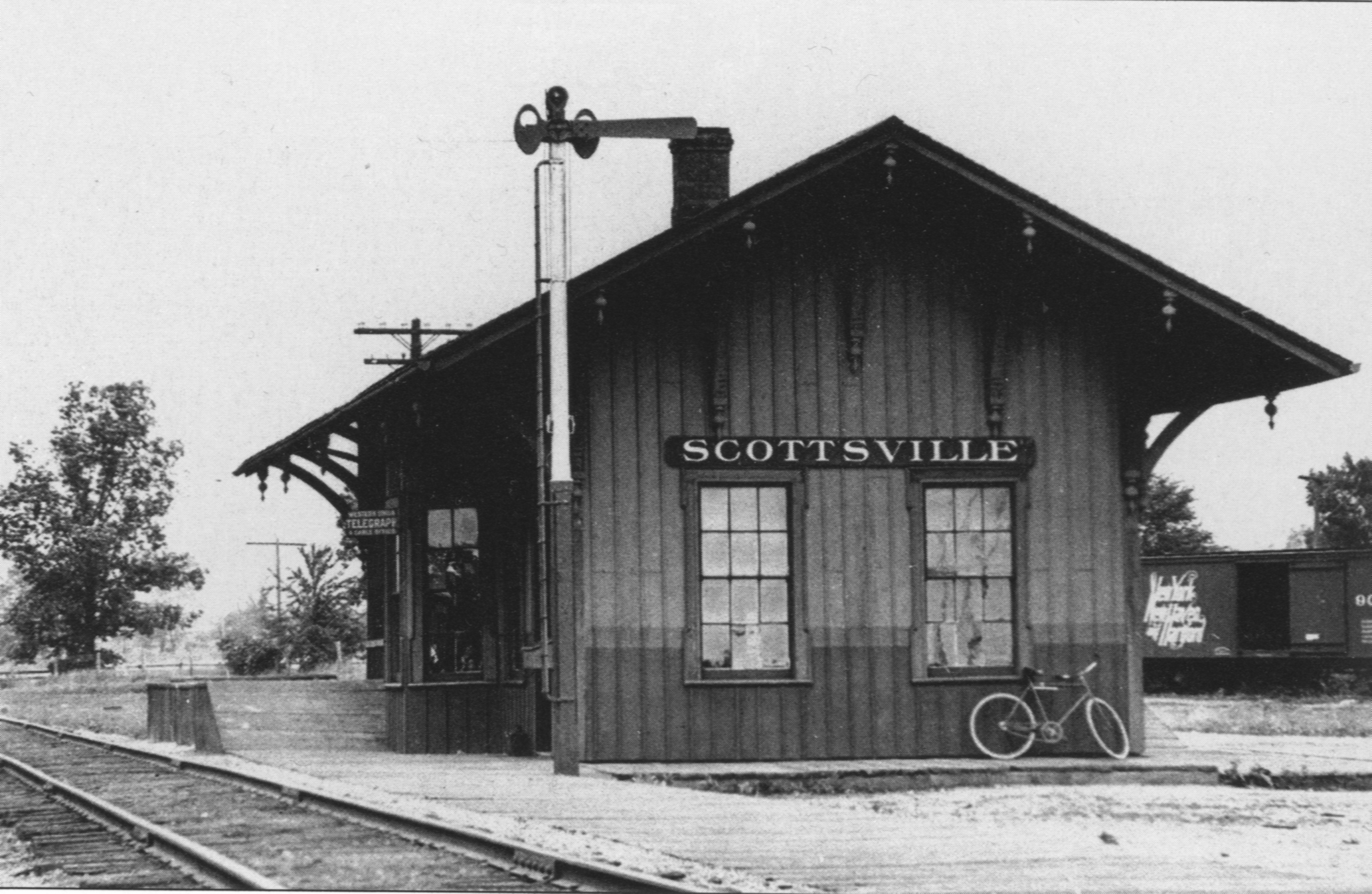
1874 Rochester and State Line station in Scottsville. The siding in the back served local feed mills and coal yards, including Haxton's.

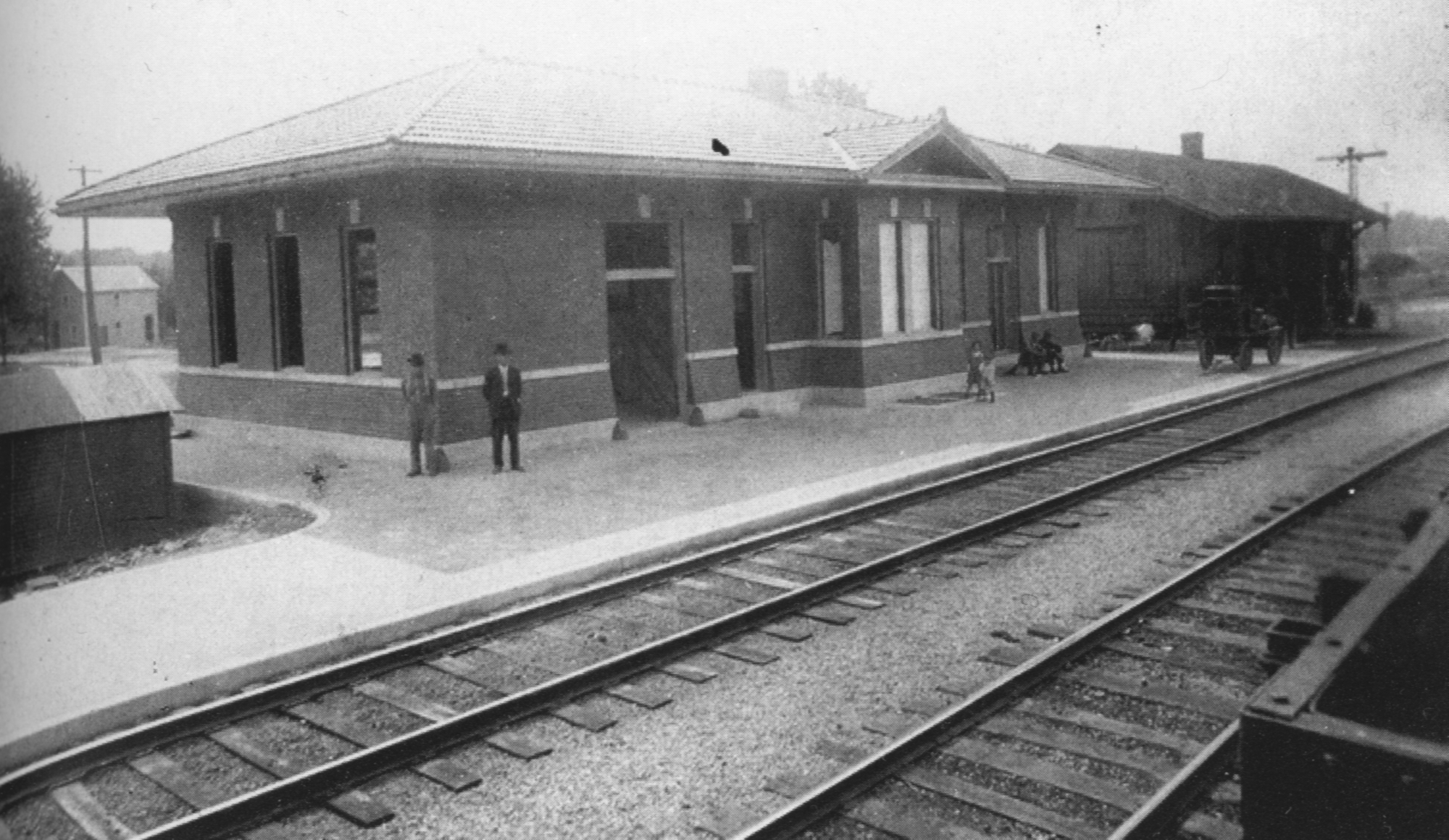
New BR&P station in Scottsville, 1911. This replaced the older station, seen here north of the new one.

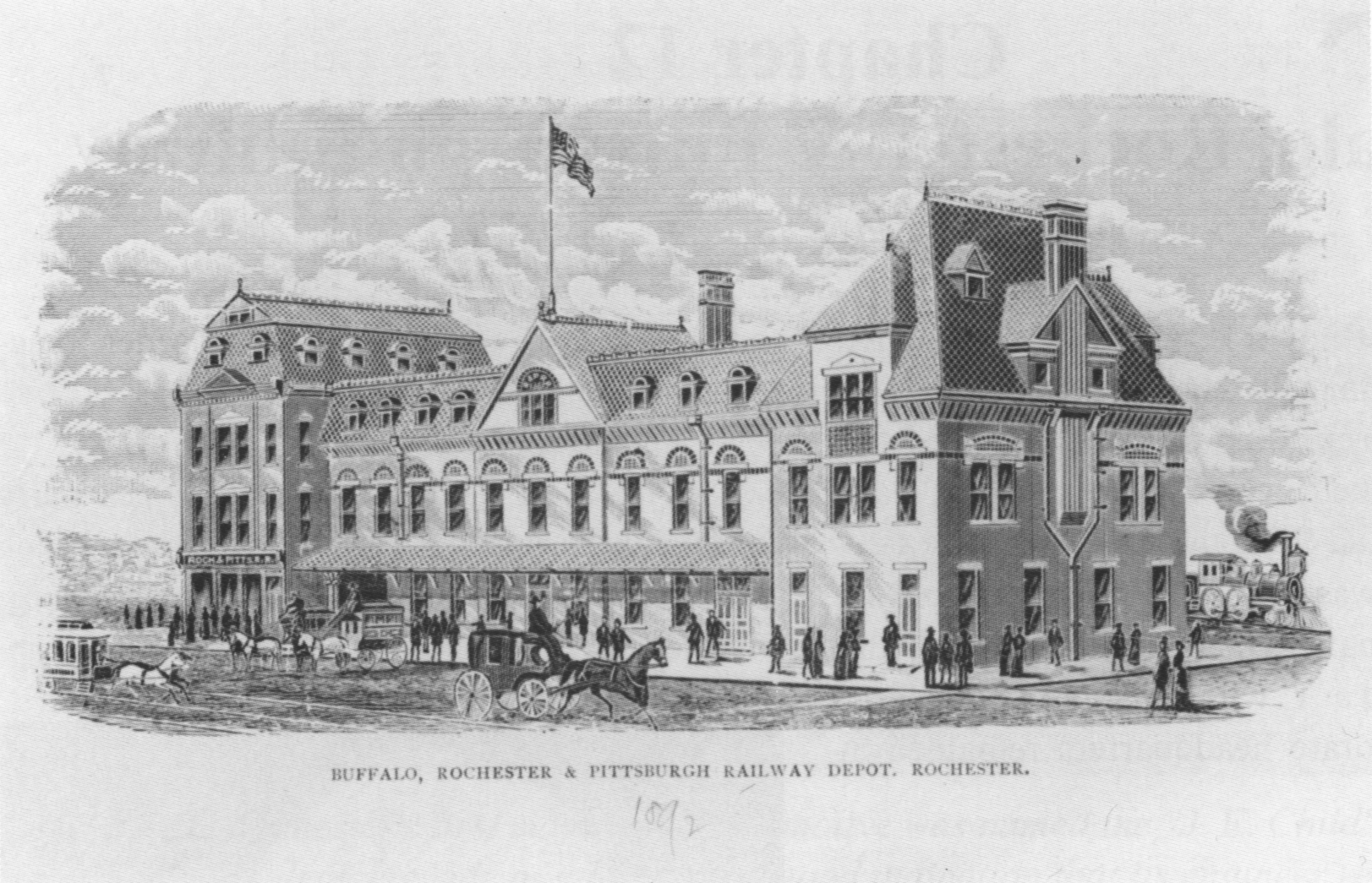
The Rochester terminal of the Buffalo, Rochester and Pittsburgh Railway, located on Main Street West at Oak Street

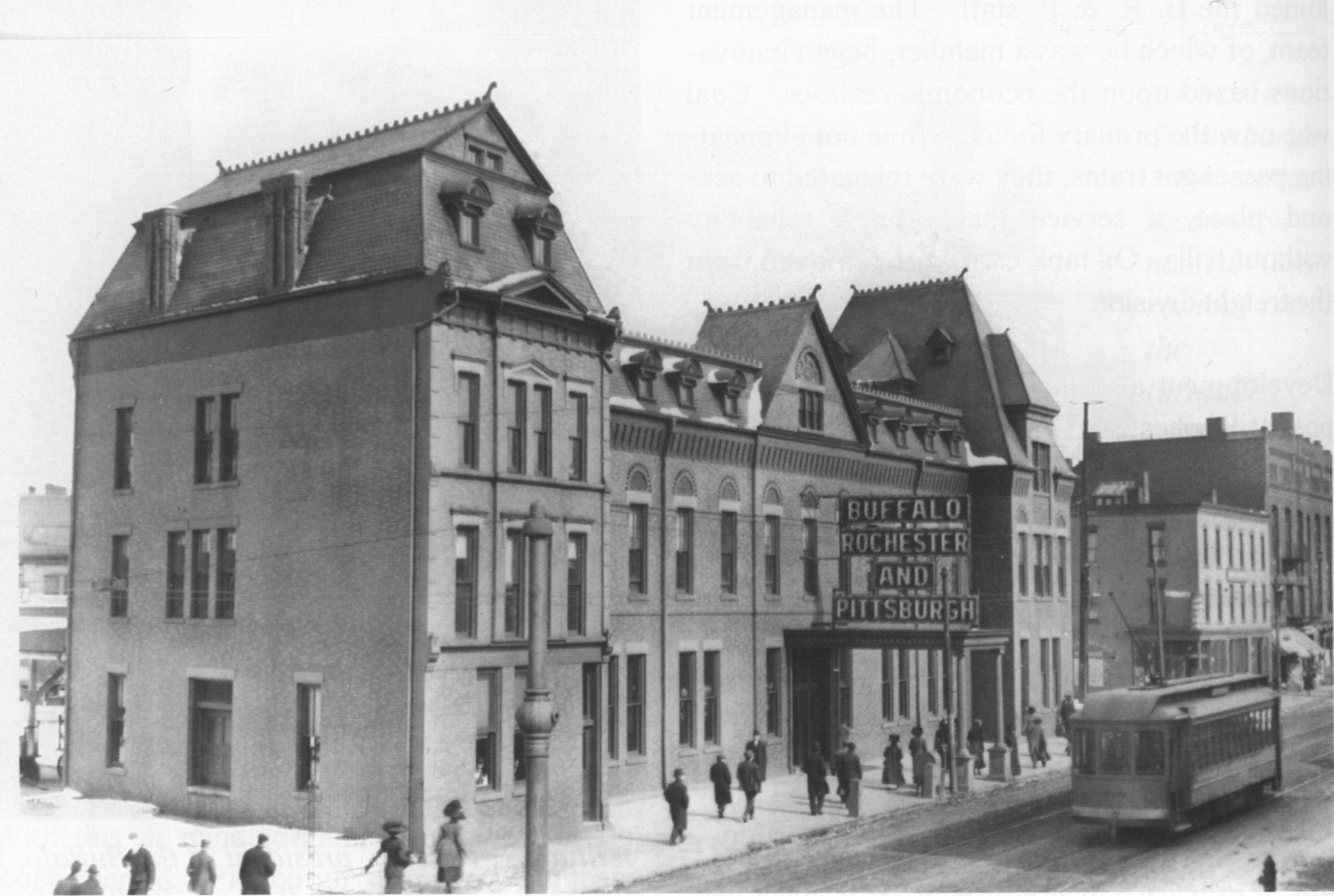
The Rochester terminal of the Buffalo, Rochester and Pittsburgh Railway, now the home of the Nick Tahou restaurant

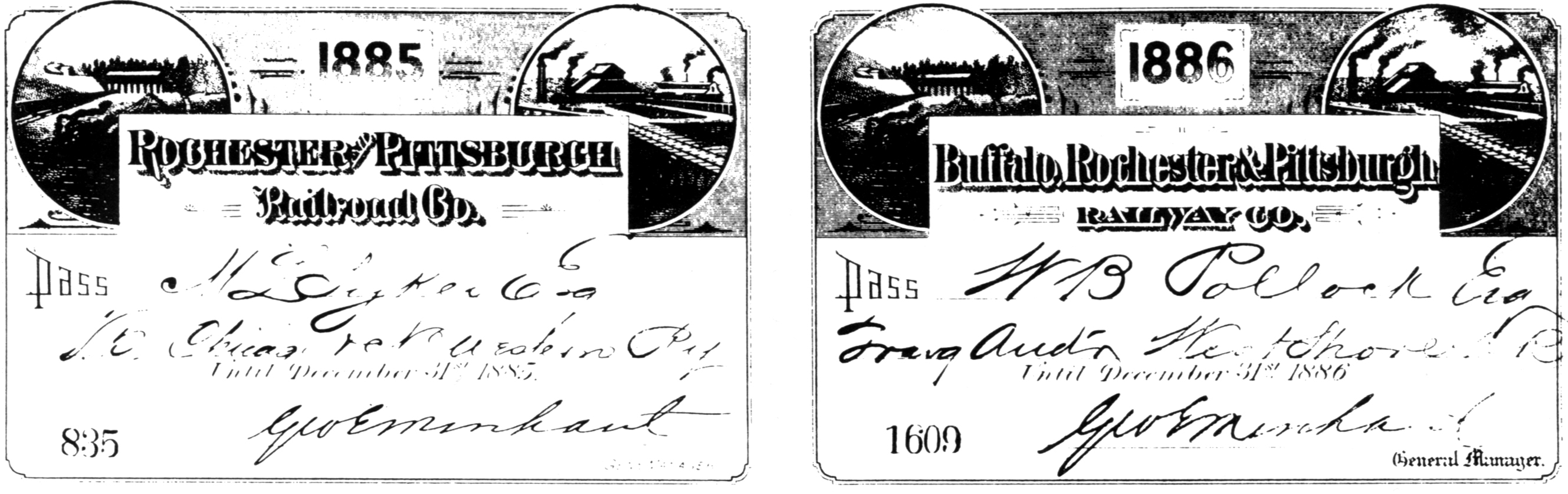
Passes issued by the Rochester and Pittsburgh and its successor, the Buffalo, Rochester and Pittsburgh Railway

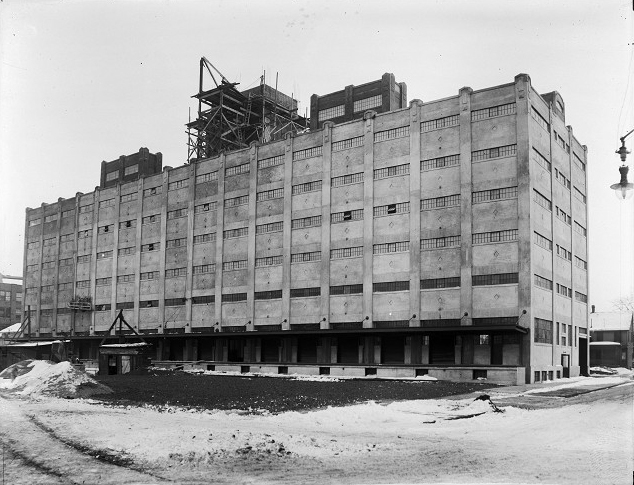
The Buffalo, Rochester and Pittsburgh Railway passenger station was south of the railroad tracks. The freight station, shown here in 1914 during construction, was built between the north side of the tracks and the Erie Canal at 25 Oak Street, opposite the passenger station.

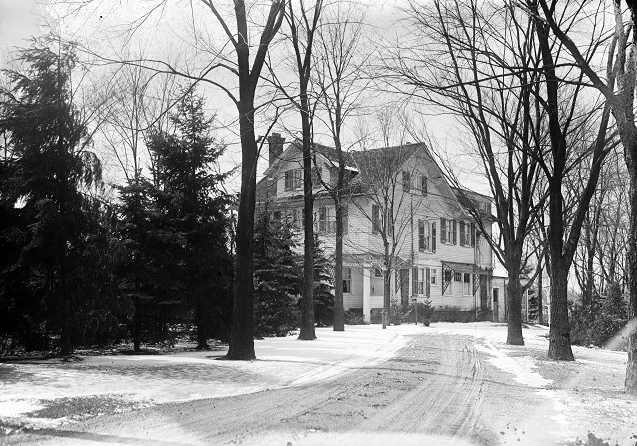
East Avenue (Rochester) home of BR&P president, William Noonan

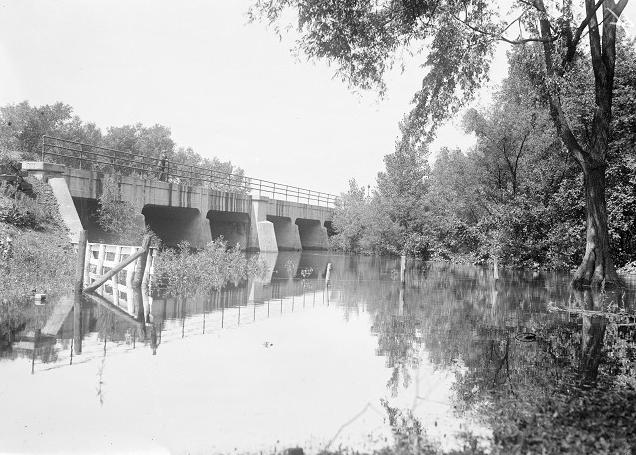
The BR&P line crossed Black Creek between Lincoln Park and Scottsville

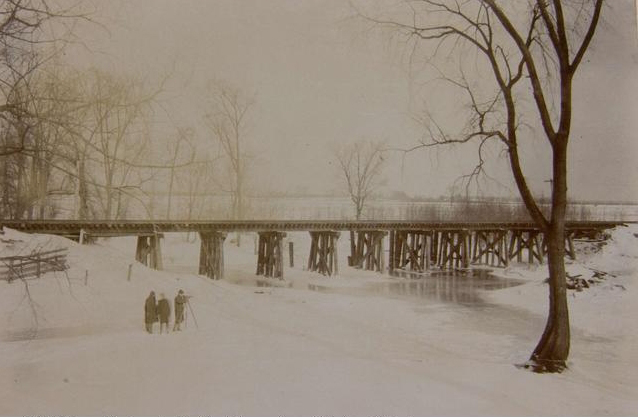
BR&P trestle crossing Black Creek in Chili, 23 March 1903

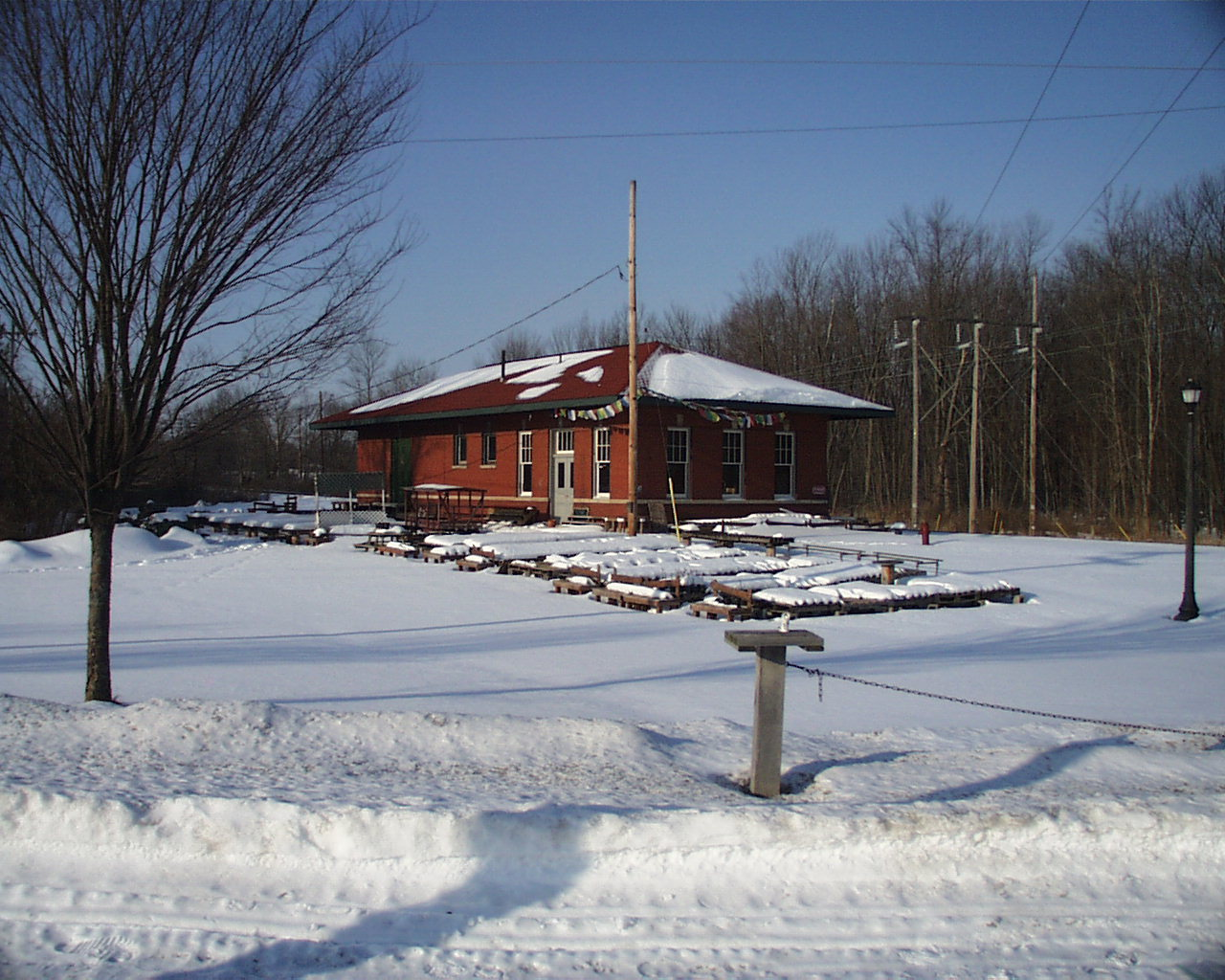
Today, the train station in Mumford is an herb store.

The public face of a railroad is its stations, and the BR&P demonstrated its respect for its customers with well-designed, well-built, and well-maintained railway stations, most of which outlasted the company. Some were erected anew, while others, like the terminus in Rochester, were improvements of existing buildings.

The original Scottsville station of the Buffalo, Rochester and Pittsburgh sat at the west end of Maple Street, (Note: This street had been built in the 1870s in order to make the train station accessible from Browns Avenue.) well to the north of the end of the road. Its 1911 replacement was on the curve where Maple turns south to Wyvil and Hanford. The railroad built a new station in Scottsville, formally dedicating it in 1911. Sitting approximately one hundred meters south of the original building, it was introduced to the public in a modest ceremony featuring Surrogate Judge Selden S Brown and businessman David Salyerds.

In the summer of 1911, the line started a new station on the west side of Main Street in Mumford, completing it in October 1912. Over seven hundred people attended the opening, including Judge Brown again. This station, on the very south side of Wheatland, accommodated both Mumford and Caledonia.

The Buffalo, Rochester and Pittsburgh stations in Springville, New York, and Orchard Park, New York, were listed on the National Register of Historic Places in 1991 and 2007, respectively.

The Rochester station at 320 Main Street West survives today as the restaurant Nick Tahou's. That part of Oak Street which ended at the station on Main Street disappeared when the I-490 expressway and Frontier Field were built. The track behind the station, however, survives as part of the Rochester and Southern, whose parent company, the Genesee and Wyoming, purchased the Rochester to Ashford Junction portion of the former BR&P in 1986.

The Bradford station saw enormous activity at the end of the 19th century. The BR&P had a maintenance facility in this oil town, along with their cross-tie and timber factory, which operated its own two-foot-gauge micro-railroad for moving the timbers about. Other railroads active in Bradford at the time included the Bradford, Bordell, and Kinzua, the Olean, Bradford, and Warren, the Kindell and Eldred, and the bizarre little Bradford and Foster Brook Monorail. At the time, the BR&P averaged some fifty freight crews operating out of Bradford, with the Erie, Pennsylvania, and short lines contributing their share.

== Operation ==
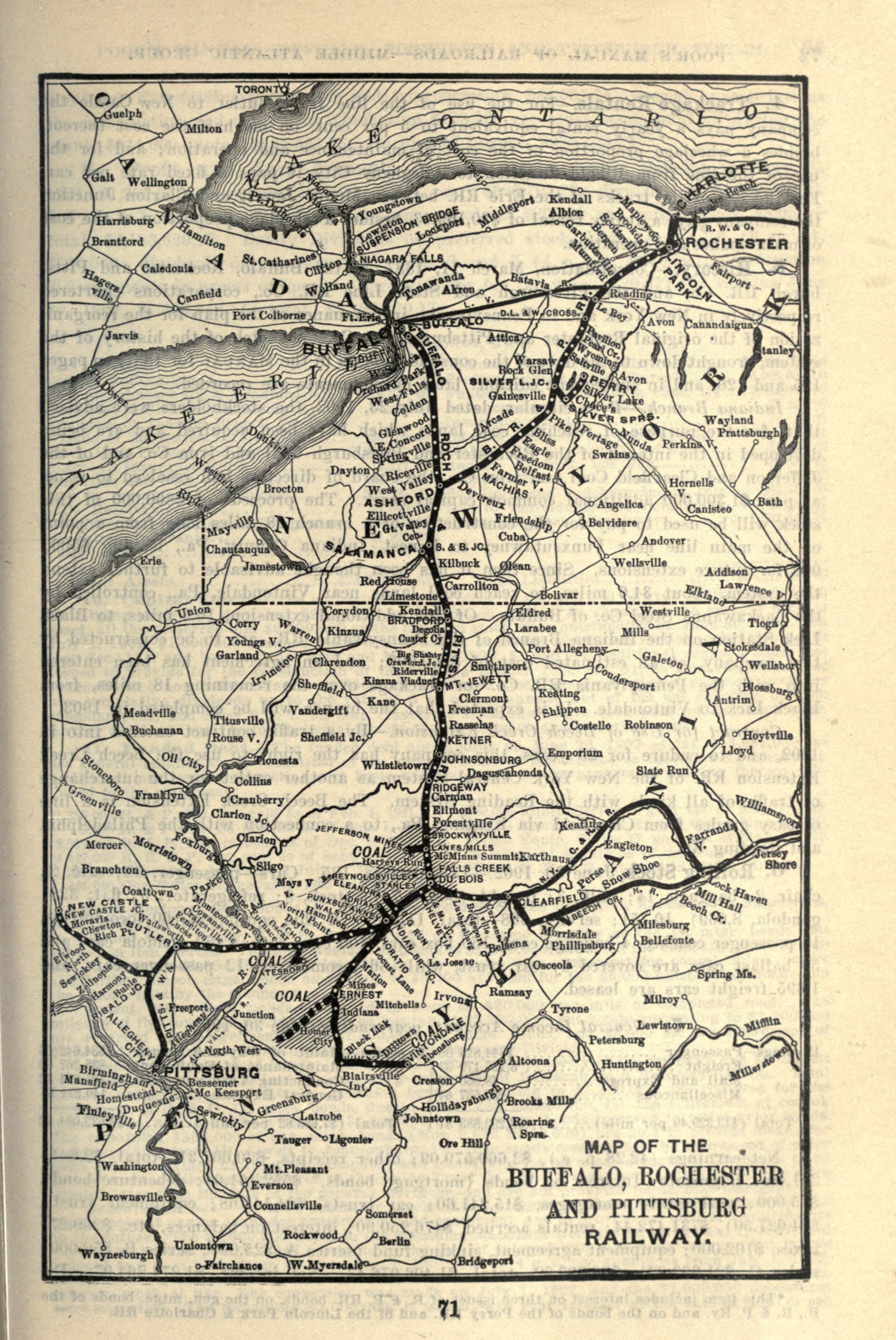
System map as of 1903

=== Coal ===
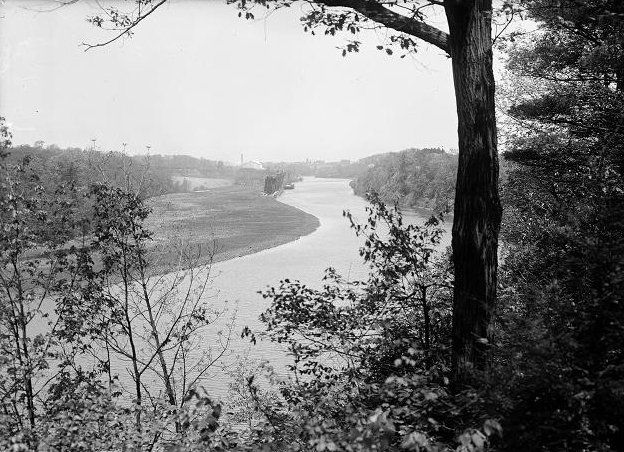
Genesee Coal Dock, looking north along the river toward Lake Ontario

The Buffalo, Rochester and Pittsburgh Railway was a company built on and around taking coal north out of Pennsylvania. The financial backer of the newly founded Rochester and Pittsburgh Railroad, the banking house of Adrian Iselin, owned not only an interest in the rail line but coal mines and coke processing facilities. The Iselin presence at the southern end of the BR&P was such that today's maps of the coal mining region show such place names as Adrian, Adrian Furnace, Adrian Mines, and Iselin Heights; moreover, the railroad named one entire branch after him. Iselin's intention (Note: His first land purchase in 1881 included 6,000 acres (24 km^{2}) of the "very best bituminous coal lands in Pennsylvania," according to the coal company's first annual report.) was to ship 2000 tons of coal daily, to which end Iselin and the railroad established the Rochester and Pittsburgh Coal and Iron Company, entirely owned by the R&P. Walston H Brown was president of both corporations. The company town at the southern end of the railroad, in the 11,500 acres (47 km^{2}) acquired by the coal company in the Punxsutawney area, was given the name Walston, Pennsylvania. (Note: Apparently, the corporate charters of the day did not have mandatory modesty provisions.) The initial coal production facilities yielded approximately six hundred tons daily, at a total mine-to-carload cost of seventy-three cents per ton.

The first coal to be shipped on the R&P went to the Rochester coal merchant, Arthur G Yates. Such was the demand for coal that the coal shipments began well before track construction had been completed, leading to constant conflict in scheduling. By 1886, the railroad had some 4,182 freight cars, and 3,028 of them were coal cars. Of those, perhaps 500 belonged to the Rochester and Pittsburgh Coal and Iron Company. By the mid-1880s, the railroad was running forty or more coal trains a day. Since coke was a valuable commodity, the coal company built a mile and a quarter long string of 475 coke furnaces, the largest in the world at the time, producing 22,000 tons a month, some of which was shipped out by train. Much of the coke, however, was consumed on-site in refining the iron ore brought in by lakes freighter and trans-shipped to the iron mills by the coal trains on their way back south.

Two coal companies accounted for the coal trade carried by the railroad. At first competitors, the Rochester and Pittsburgh Coal and Iron Company and the Bell, Lewis, and Yates Coal Mining Company became very good friends when Frederick Bell, George Lewis, and Arthur Yates took seats on the Buffalo, Rochester and Pittsburgh Railway board of directors. In fact, with Iselin's resignation as president of the railway company, Yates took his place. The two coal companies then negotiated an agreement which eased competitive pressures and allocated access to the railroad's coal-transporting capacity. While Yates concentrated on coal, Merchant ran the railroad.

Part of Yates' contribution to the BR&P's ability to haul coal was the extension of the line north from Lincoln Park through Rochester up to the coal dock it built at the mouth of the Genesee River in 1896. With an initial capacity of 4,000 tons a day, it was expanded in 1909 and 1913. To get coal to Canada, the BR&P arranged a cross-lake ferry service with the Grand Trunk Railway. This service, which began operation in 1907, was highly successful, carrying passengers and coal cars to Cobourg, where the ferried train cars could connect with the Grand Trunk for further Canadian destinations. The office of the Port Collector for Rochester, held by George F. Roth in the first years of the ferry, had to accommodate the increase in business, and the fact that the ice-breaking ferry continued operation during winter months. By 1913, over a million tons of coal a year passed through the Rochester coal dock.

As the national economy grew, more and more coal mines were developed along the BR&P routes. In fact, the new Indiana Branch soon yielded the greatest traffic volume as mines opened in the area south of Punxsutawney. By the 1920s, coal trains averaged 3,750 tons, (Note: This was tame when compared to the world record, an Australian ore train claiming a mass of over 100,000 short tons, or when compared to the 10 to 20 kiloton coal trains hauled by the steam engines in Appalachia (cite not available).) requiring considerably better motive power than the archaic Consolidations of the earlier era. However, long coal drags with one or two Mallets at the head did not last forever. In the first quarter of the new century, the market share held by the comparatively costly union-made coal of Pennsylvania was driven down by the cheaper coal from the non-union mines of Kentucky and West Virginia. The companies of the Pittsburgh Coal District sought federal regulation of coal industry wages but lost. In a series of moves to protect themselves, the coal companies transferred to the BR&P not only the short-line railroads they'd built themselves but also the Genesee Coal Dock facility. This had the effect of improving the coal companies' fiscal performance, but it effectively hung an anchor on the railroad's neck as it swam in deeper and deeper waters.

The headquarters of both the Buffalo, Rochester and Pittsburgh Railway and the Rochester and Pittsburgh Coal and Iron Company were in the elegant building on Main Street West in Rochester, and the bitter arguments between William Noonan, the head of the railway, and L W Robinson, the head of the coal company, became the stuff of local legend. In the end, both companies lost. The railroad disappeared into the B&O, and the coal company, which survived at least until 1981 in dramatically reduced size, is today no longer to be found in Rochester.

=== Passenger service ===
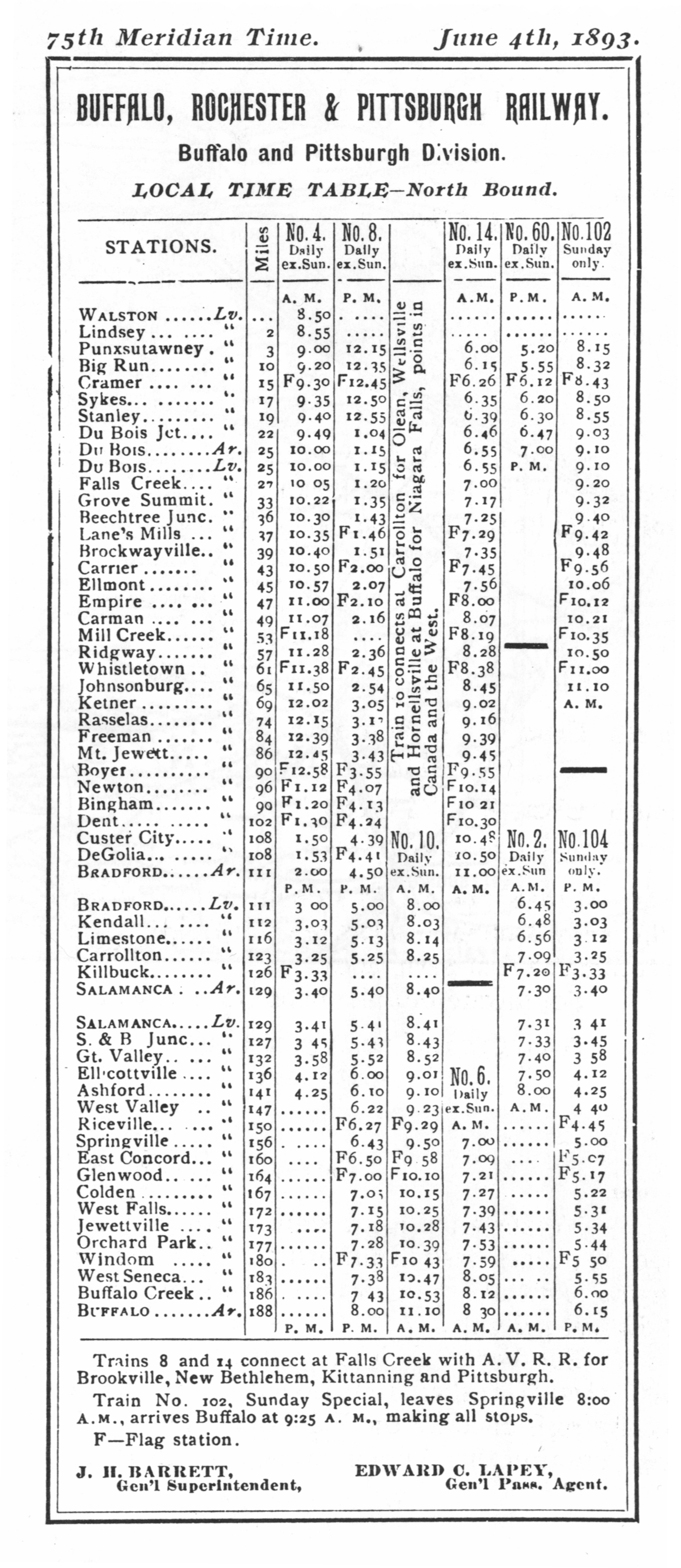
Buffalo, Rochester and Pittsburgh Railway timetable from 4 June 1893

The Buffalo, Rochester and Pittsburgh Railway thrived on the haulage of heavy freight, primarily Pennsylvania coal, but its passenger service was characterized as "second to none". The first passenger run took place on the Rochester and State Line Railroad on its 15 September 1874 run from Rochester to Le Roy. The last was on 15 October 1955, when the Baltimore and Ohio Railroad ended its Buffalo - Pittsburgh service.

At the start of the 20th century, the BR&P inaugurated a through service connecting Rochester and Pittsburgh. The first run of the Pittsburgh Mail and Express left Rochester at precisely 0900 on 10 October 1899, bound for Pittsburgh, 330 miles (530 km) to the south. The night departure was called the Pittsburgh Night Express. The return trips were the Buffalo Rochester Mail and Express and the Buffalo Rochester Night Express. These later became the Great Lakes Express and the Pittsburgh Flyer.

The company took pride in doing its job properly. (Note: A comparison between the BR&P's record of passenger service and that of today's passenger rail service would serve little purpose.) In its report for the year ending 30 June 1915, the New York State Public Service Commission observed that the BR&P had operated 13,877 passenger runs. Of these, 12,628 were on time. The average delay was two minutes.

Commuter rail service on the Buffalo, Rochester and Pittsburgh and the Pennsylvania connected outlying towns and villages to Rochester. In some areas, Darwinian competition resulted in the failure of other rail lines, e.g. the Springville and Sardinia Railroad.

=== Pushers and helpers ===
Early freight operations consisted of trains of fewer than twenty cars, for the cars were weak and the locomotives small. The hilly terrain over which the BR&P routes ran posed problems, especially in the days before steel rolling stock. To negotiate these grades, the railroad needed to use helpers and pushers. If the second (or third) engine were put at the head of the train, then too much weight aft might result in a broken coupler and the lethal problem of a runaway. If the additional power were at the back end, then the soft wood cars tended to buckle under the compression. Occasionally, a compromise would put the helper locomotive at or near the center of the train. Using helpers brought an additional problem. Since these engines were needed only on steeper grades and since the railroad would never countenance the expense of a second engine and crew on the entire run, the helpers had to return to the bottom of the grade for the next heavy train needing a push. At first, this meant running backward after uncoupling from the rear of the train. The BR&P discouraged backward running as bad practice, (Note: Company policy demanded full water tanks when running backward; this discouraged light tenders from jumping the rails. The crews, too, disliked the practice, since it meant very cold rides in winter, the back curtain needing to be left open for visibility.) a problem that eventually was solved with the construction of wyes for turning around. Additionally, care had to be exercised to avoid placing a caboose between a pusher and a train, as this crushed the soft cabooses.

One practice not encouraged by management was disconnecting helper locomotives (Note: The pusher was at the rear of the train; the helper was at the front.) on the fly. The engineer of the helper would back off on the throttle to unload the coupler, and the fireman would pull the pin to separate the two engines. The helper would then sprint ahead to the siding, throw the switch, pull off the line, and reset the switch, preferably all before the train arrived at the turnout.

The BR&P had four divisions, and helpers/pushers were used on all of them. The real difference arose because of the preponderance of heavy loads running northbound. For instance, coal trains were loaded northbound and empty southbound, as were the oil tankers. However, prior to World War I, the BR&P ran ore trains from Buffalo south to the iron mills in DuBois. (Note: These belonged to the Rochester and Pittsburgh Coal and Iron Company, affiliated with the BR&P.) The steepest grades were in the Buffalo Division, but they were uphill southbound and thus not a problem for the coal trains northbound. The ore trains had to negotiate these grades uphill, and, in the days before the Mallets, the ore trains out of Buffalo Creek had two Consolidations at the front and three at the rear. The Clarion Hill grade of the Middle Division, while not the steepest, did pose the greatest challenges. The worst grades on the BR&P were in the 84 to 89 feet (27 m) per mile range.

In later years, when wood freight cars had long been forgotten, helpers and pushers remained, although in the form of much larger, heavier, more powerful locomotives assisting far heavier trains. The BR&P operated two 700 series (Note: As well as the 800 series, two of which were kept at Clarion Junction for pushing BR&P and Erie trains over Clarion Hill.) of Mallets: the comparatively light 700 through 741 and the heavier 742 through 754. Since they differed in frame design, this meant that the weaker 8th century were never doubled together. (Note: The BR&P Department of Motive Power feared that running two of these in tandem incurred the risk of bending the frame.) Instead, a light 700 would be coupled ahead of the heavier one for a double. When two 700 series Mallets were pushing, the same constraint was applied. If the run utilized two light Mallets, then the second one was placed at the rear, ahead of the caboose, and pushed. One more issue with doubled Mallets was whether or not all the bridges on the run were strong enough for two of the 9th century or the heavy 8th century running together.

With the mass and power of locomotives like the Mallets, care had to be exercised in their operation. A light Mallet used as a pusher naturally connected to the train with its front coupler, and the strength of this drawhead was not infinite. While the engine could not push hard enough to break the drawhead, the engineer needed to avoid slack. On the downhill part of one run one day on the Buffalo Division from Beaver to Hoyts, the pusher engineer did not keep up with the train ahead and saw it pull away from him with his drawhead hanging from the last car. (Note: The physics is simple: the three thousand tons of the train rolling downhill at an accelerating speed generated an enormous pulling force, while the inertia of the 250 ton locomotive created a powerful resistance to acceleration, the consequence of which was the failure of the hardware securing the front coupler.)

Sometimes, the problems with pushers and helpers arose not from the hardware but the politics and the economics. In the 1880s, the BR&P and the Erie shared locomotive facilities at Clarion Junction. They had an agreement that each company would provide helper service to each other on the basis of whose engine was first up at the enginehouse when a train came along needing a push. After some years of this, the BR&P management realized that their engines were doing most of the work. The Erie crews had acquired the knack of finding something wrong with their engines, keeping them conveniently immobilized when it was time for work. The agreement ended.

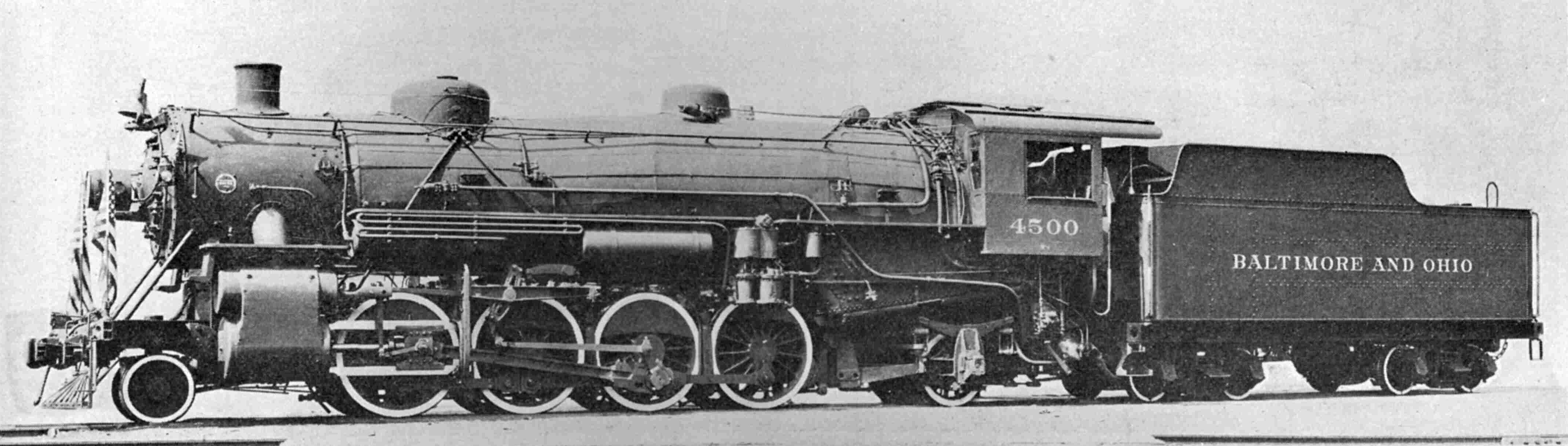
A Mikado locomotive of the Baltimore and Ohio

Both roads faced the same problems at Clarion Junction: how best to get heavy trains over Clarion Hill. By the end of the 19th century, the Erie kept two engines there, while the BR&P had up to five. Initially, they used 2-8-0 Consolidations, but the limitations of these antiquated locomotives forced adoption of specialized engines, such as the 4-8-0 Mastodon in 1896. This did not suffice, leading to the heavier Y Class 2-10-0 Decapod in 1907. The increased traffic of WW I led to the solution, the XX Class 2-8-8-2 Mallets. The BR&P bought these engines in 1918 essentially for one purpose, to "push Clarion Hill off the map". These locomotives were well suited to the task, as they were slow and capable of massive drawbar traction. The cooperation between the BR&P and the Erie ended in 1928, when the Erie made sweeping improvements, including introduction of 2-8-4 Berkshires and 2-8-2 Mikados, making the BR&P helpers/pushers superfluous to requirements. On some runs, the Erie put two engines at the head of the train and a third at the rear. This saved as much as ten to twelve minutes on the hill and enabled longer consists. Since the third engine, the pusher, was lighter than the BR&P Mallet, it could push against the caboose rather than needing to be placed ahead of it, making it much easier and faster to detach from the train.

In the days before radio, dispatching locomotives involved using whatever means of communication were available. The BR&P maintained a helper station at a siding between Dellwood and Lanes Mills, south of Brockwayville. The 700 series Mallets stationed here were required to assist coal trains up to McMinn Summit. When this was necessary, the dispatcher would call the crew to work by ringing a phone booth located next to the siding. A loud bell generally sufficed to wake up the engine crew. On those occasions when it did not, the dispatcher would call the McMinn farm nearby, and one of the McMinn children would run over to the siding to awaken the engineer and fireman.

=== Maintenance facilities ===
Steam locomotives imposed enormous maintenance burdens on the railroads. Primitive in design, they contained numerous self-destructive moving parts which were manufactured using, by contemporary standards, exceptionally primitive techniques. (Note: Sometimes, welding consisted of nothing more than heating the ends of the two parts to incandescence and then hammering them until they became a single piece. This is part of the reason why steam locomotive parts failed catastrophically.) In fact, a number of railroads were capable of making their own locomotives and cars, and did so.

When the Rochester and Pittsburgh Railroad took over the facilities of the Rochester and State Line Railroad, it acquired little in the way of usable maintenance assets. To remedy this deficiency, the R&P bought land in the Lincoln Park section of Rochester and, in 1881, built a machine shop for repair work. In 1882, they erected a roundhouse, today at the corner of West Avenue and Buffalo Road. (The turntable has been preserved by the Rochester & Genesee Valley Railroad Museum in Rush, New York, while the building itself has been converted for use by a scrap company.) This facility, with its fourteen-stall enginehouse, was the central shop for the entire line. The other end of the line (at the time) was in Salamanca, where the company built a smaller facility, including a two-stall enginehouse, a turntable, and the Ramsey Transfer mechanism needed for interchange with the Erie. (Note: When the Erie adopted the standard gauge, this was removed.) Additional facilities were installed at Perry and Gainesville in the 1880s, along with more at Ashford Junction and Clarion Junction.

Since railroad shops meant employment, small towns vied aggressively to convince the railroads to build facilities in their taxing jurisdictions. Bradford, for instance, gave the R&P 8 acres (32,000 m^{2}) of land and an eight thousand dollar grant for construction. The investment by the town paid off: the R&P set up a roundhouse and turntable, a machine shop, a car repair shop, as well as coaling and watering facilities.

In the 1880s, the line to Buffalo was built, terminating at Buffalo Creek. A more modest shop was established here, including a seventy-foot turntable that had to be enlarged to one hundred five feet to accommodate the Mallets. There were only two ways to turn a locomotive around, and the wye alternative was very costly in terms of land area. Thus, Buffalo Creek had one of only two BR&P turntables (Note: The other was at Rikers.) capable of swinging a Mallet engine. On the rare occasion of a Mallet reaching Rochester, it had to be turned on a wye. The Mallet would fit into only a single stall of the Lincoln Park roundhouse; even then, it stuck out considerably in the back, so the railroad built an extension to the stall to enable the doors to be closed. The Buffalo Creek roundhouse lacked this refinement. When two Mallets were parked in it, their tenders not only stuck out but very nearly touched. To deal with this, the BR&P built the "Malley House" near the roundhouse; it accommodated two of the ninety-two-foot wheelbase engines.

The BR&P, having grown considerably, needed still more. The mine branches in the Punxsutawney area imposed their own burden on the BR&P repair capabilities, and shops were built at Elk Run, just to the north. However, the company needed a major facility at which the biggest repairs could be done; at the time (1880s), the most serious work on locomotives required sending the engines back to their builders in Dunkirk and Rome. To resolve this, the BR&P selected DuBois as the location of their primary maintenance plant.

The archetypal railroad town, DuBois had its first BR&P facility in 1886, with the car repair shop. The locomotive repair shop grew from a six-stall roundhouse at Valley and Jared Streets. When DuBois granted the railroad land and money, the expansion hit high gear. By the early 20th century, the railroad had sufficient capability at DuBois to handle everything, including building a locomotive from scratch. The BR&P could now cycle engines through the shop on a regular basis, thus keeping their motive power available and reliable.

This expansion did not occur at the expense of other sites. East Salamanca was chosen in 1906 for a new roundhouse and classification yard, thanks to a location convenient to the Buffalo, Middle, and Rochester Divisions. The introduction of the huge Class XX 2-8-8-2 Mallets in 1918 necessitated construction of appropriate shop facilities at East Salamanca. This included electric jacks that could lift the Mallet off the ground. The third shop site was at Rikers, near Punxsutawney, Pennsylvania, which was enlarged in 1918 with a new 16-stall roundhouse and machine shop.

Among the other annoyances that management had to face, one peculiar to steam locomotive operation plagued the BR&P. In addition to the accidents resulting from employee carelessness, in which doors and walls were destroyed by the impacts of engines that were not stopped in time, the engines themselves were prone to go walkabout if left idling with a head of steam. A worn valve might pass sufficient steam to enable the locomotive to go through a roundhouse wall or door, drive into a turntable pit, or amble down the rail line, all on its own.

In April 1930, sparks from a crane ignited the roof of the older roundhouse at DuBois; the fire put the building out of operation until autumn, and the eleven locomotives inside suffered considerable damage.

== Accidents ==
Buffalo, Rochester and Pittsburgh Railway accidents

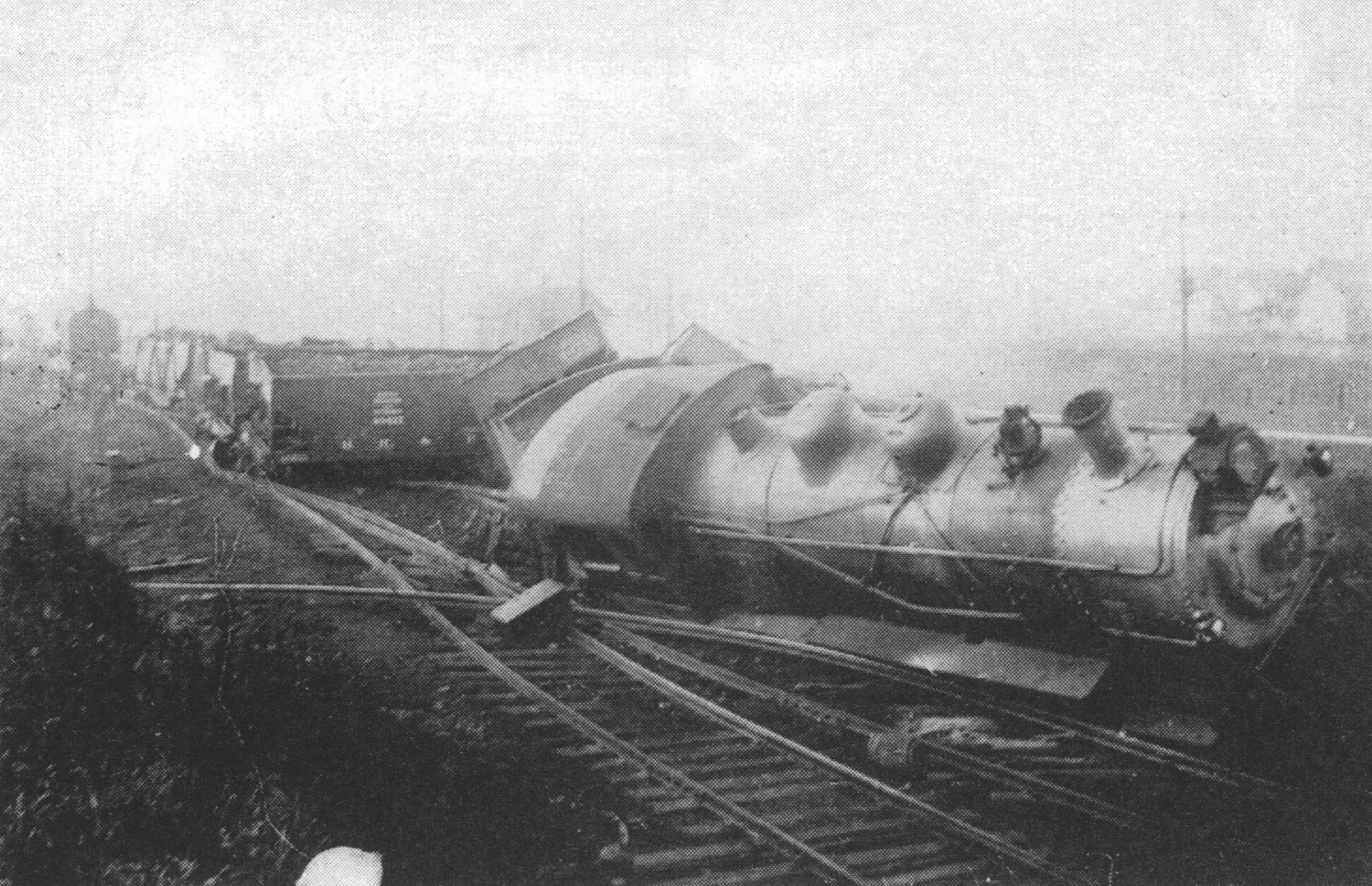
This train hit an improperly set switch in the East Salamanca yard on the evening of 16 October 1917. The toll was one locomotive on its side, thirteen cars tumbled into a mess, of which two were destroyed, and one engineer in the hospital with a wrenched back.

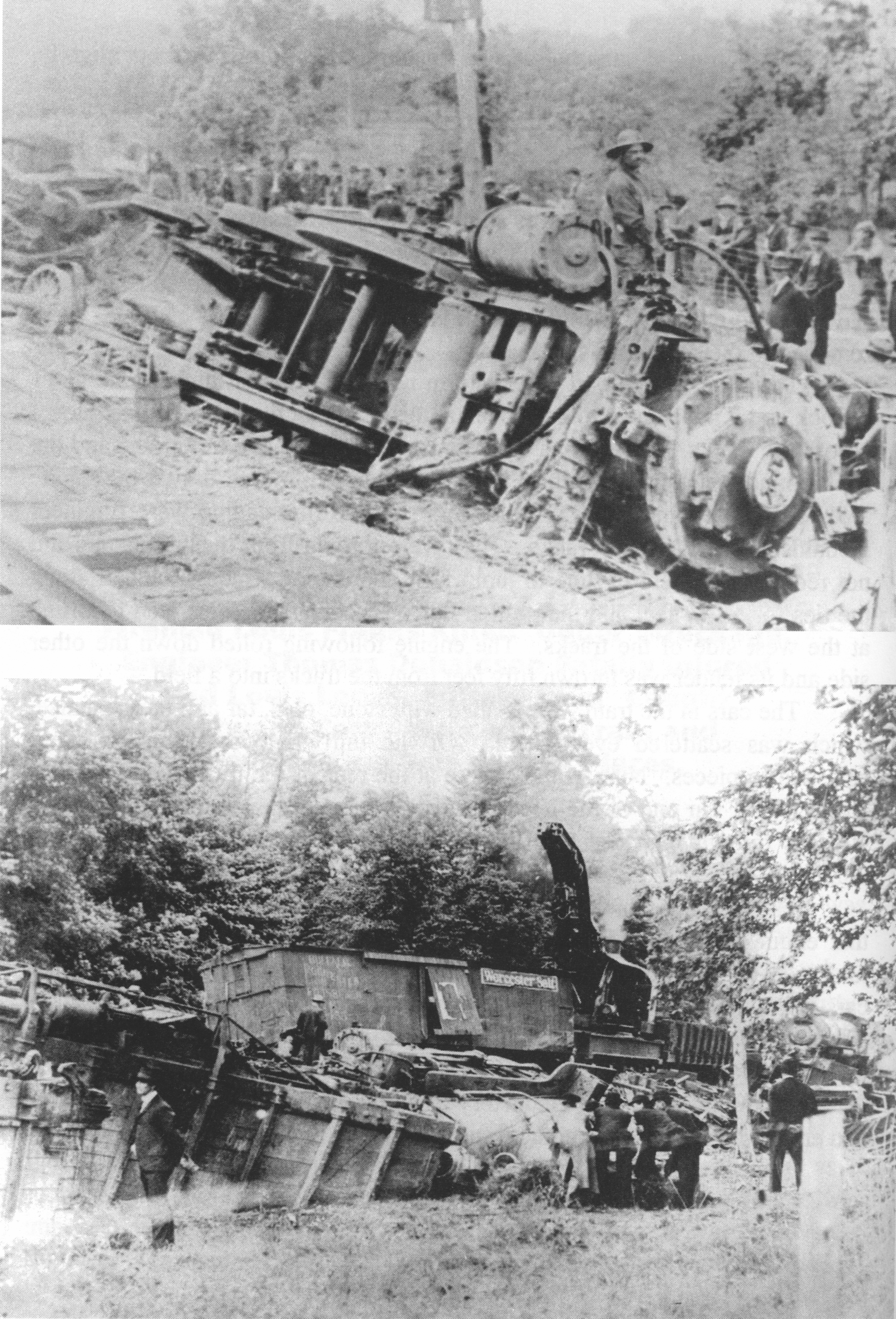
On 8 June 1906, a severe storm felled an 80-foot-tall (24 m) elm tree, dropping it on the BR&P tracks one mile (1.6 km) north of Pavilion. The freight train was unable to slow from its fifty-mile per hour speed before striking the tree. Both locomotives were thrown from the track, and several crew were killed.

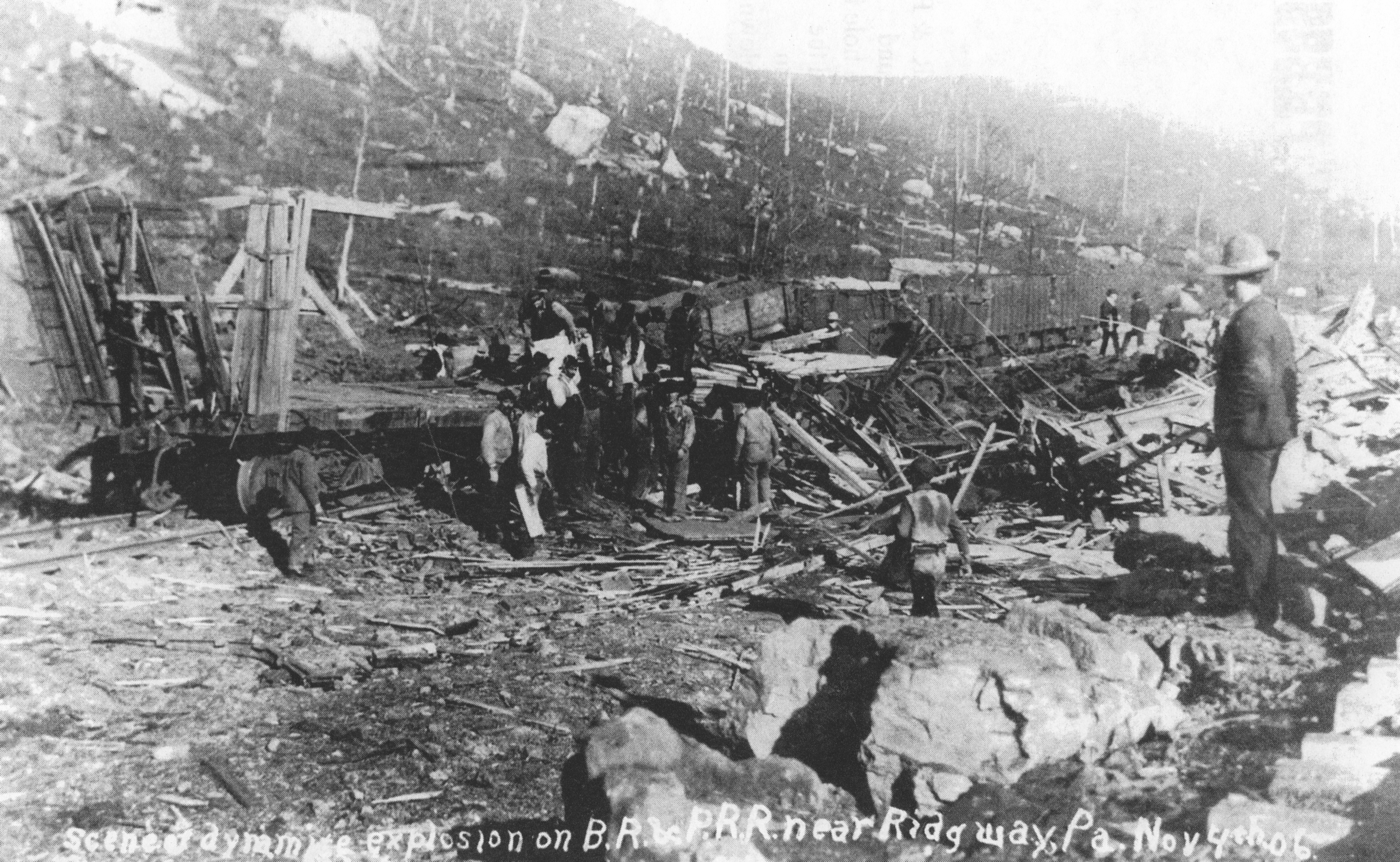
The explosion of a car carrying dynamite in Ridgway, Pennsylvania, on 4 November 1906 left the crew of the train uninjured but reduced fifteen freight cars to rubble, as well as accounting for an untold number of neighborhood windows.

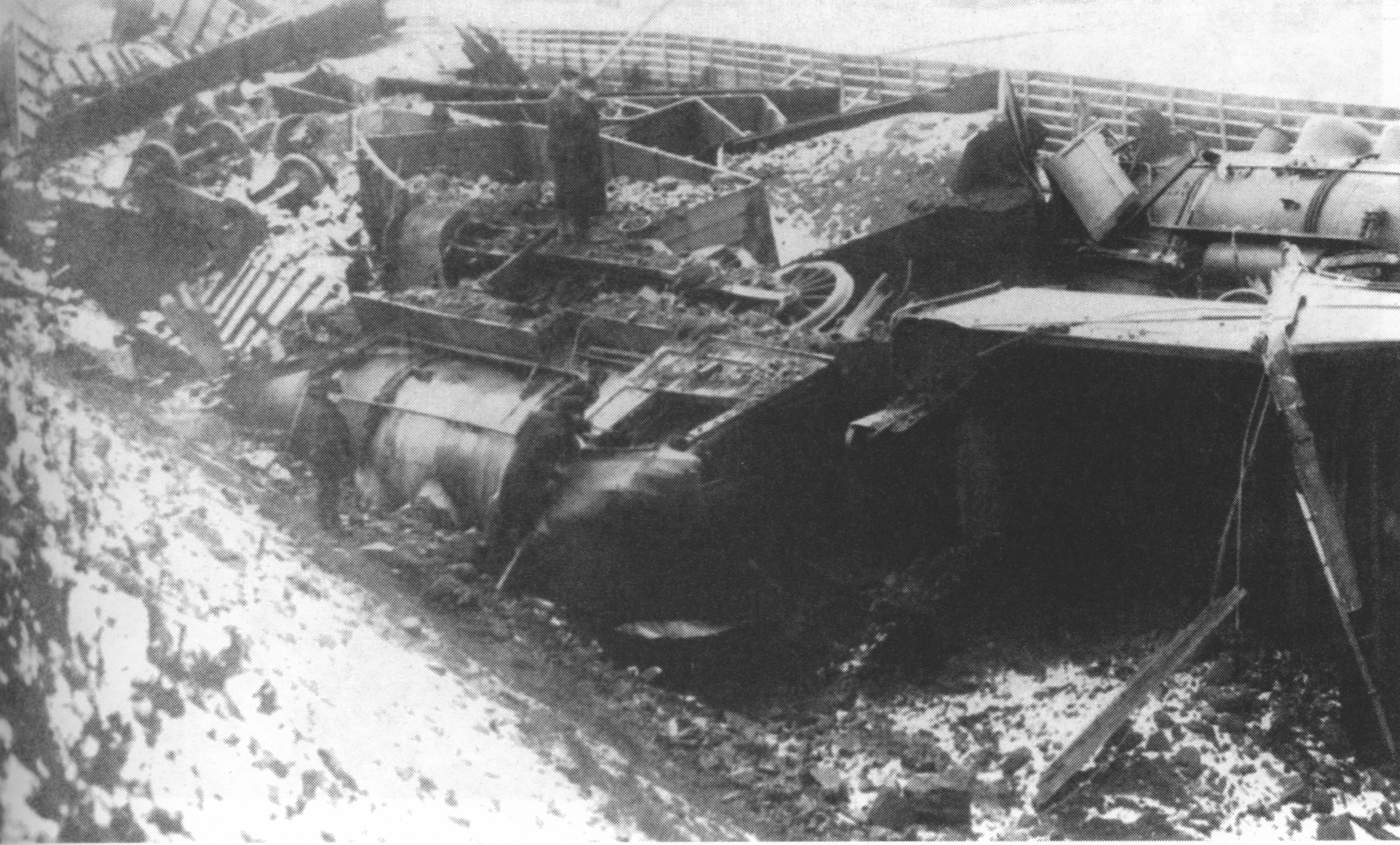
The failure of the brakes on a coal train headed downhill plus the presence of another train headed in the opposite direction near Silver Springs Junction added up to one fatality and forty wrecked freight cars. The estimated cost was a quarter of a million dollars, in the days when the typical wreck's cost was a few thousand.

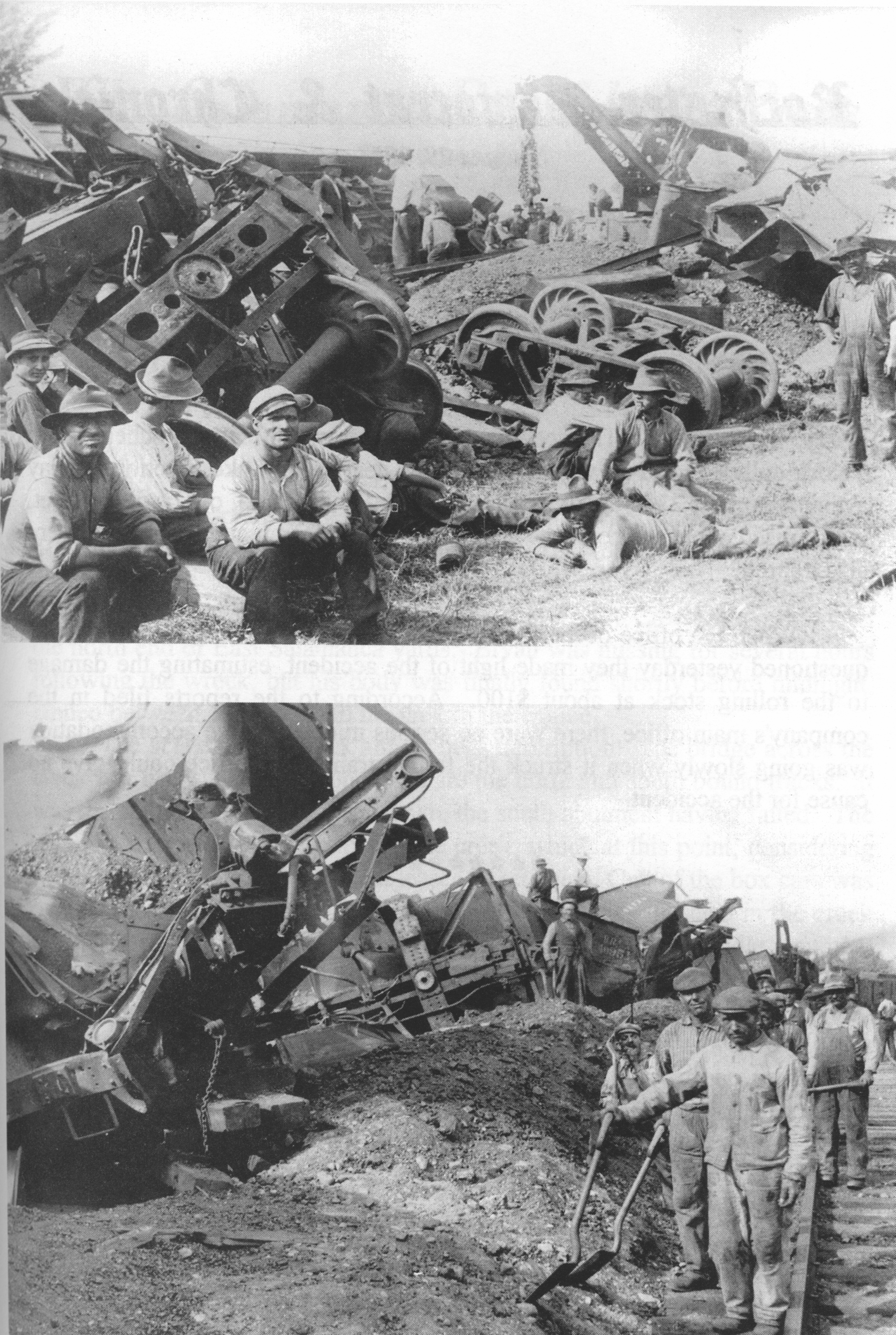
Minor injuries and nineteen wrecked cars resulted from this rear-end collision at Mumford on 21 August 1911.

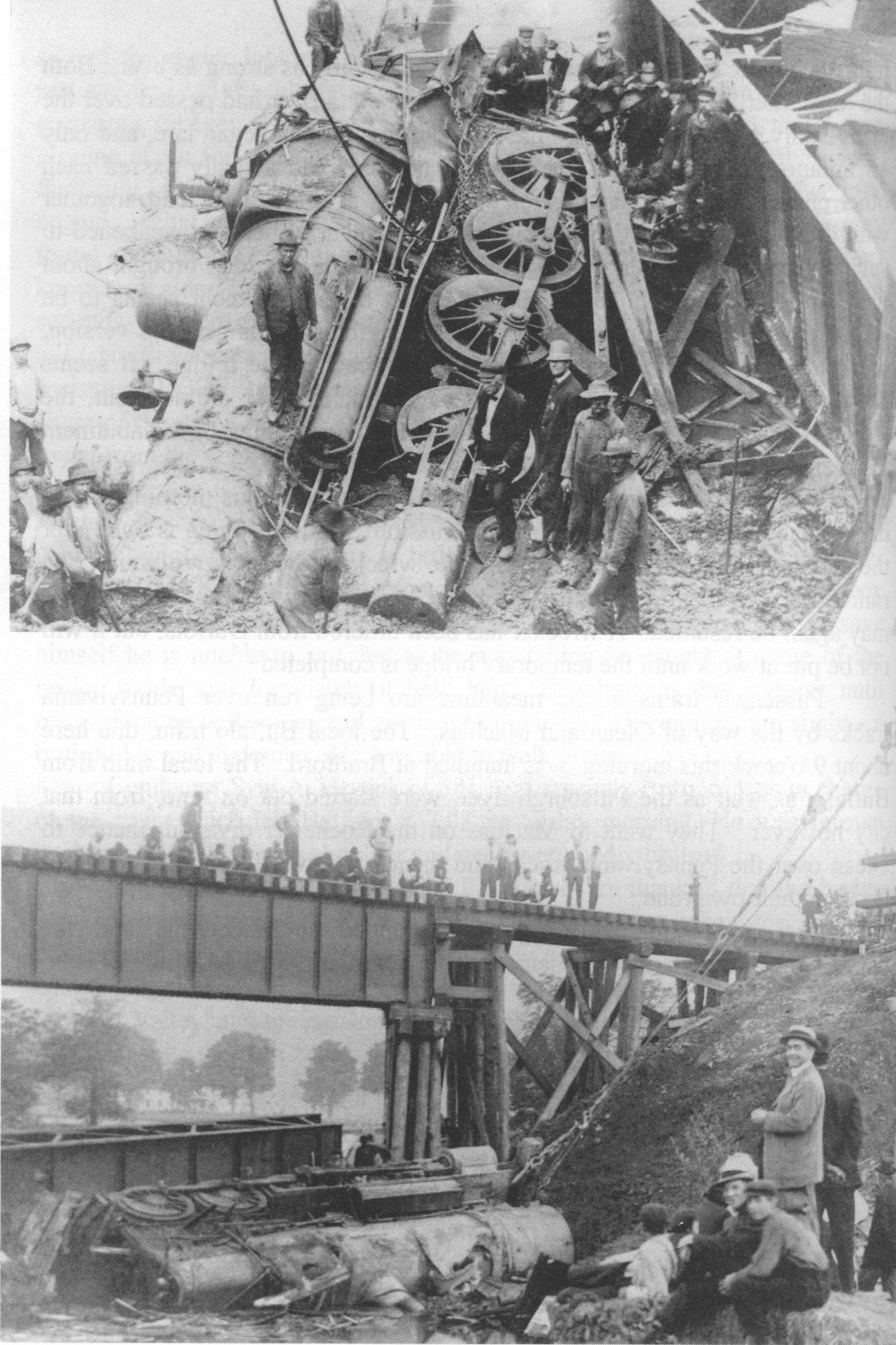
When the south abutment of the East Salamanca yard's bridge across the Great Valley Creek failed on 20 September 1912, half of the bridge dropped, and so did the train on it. (See text below.)

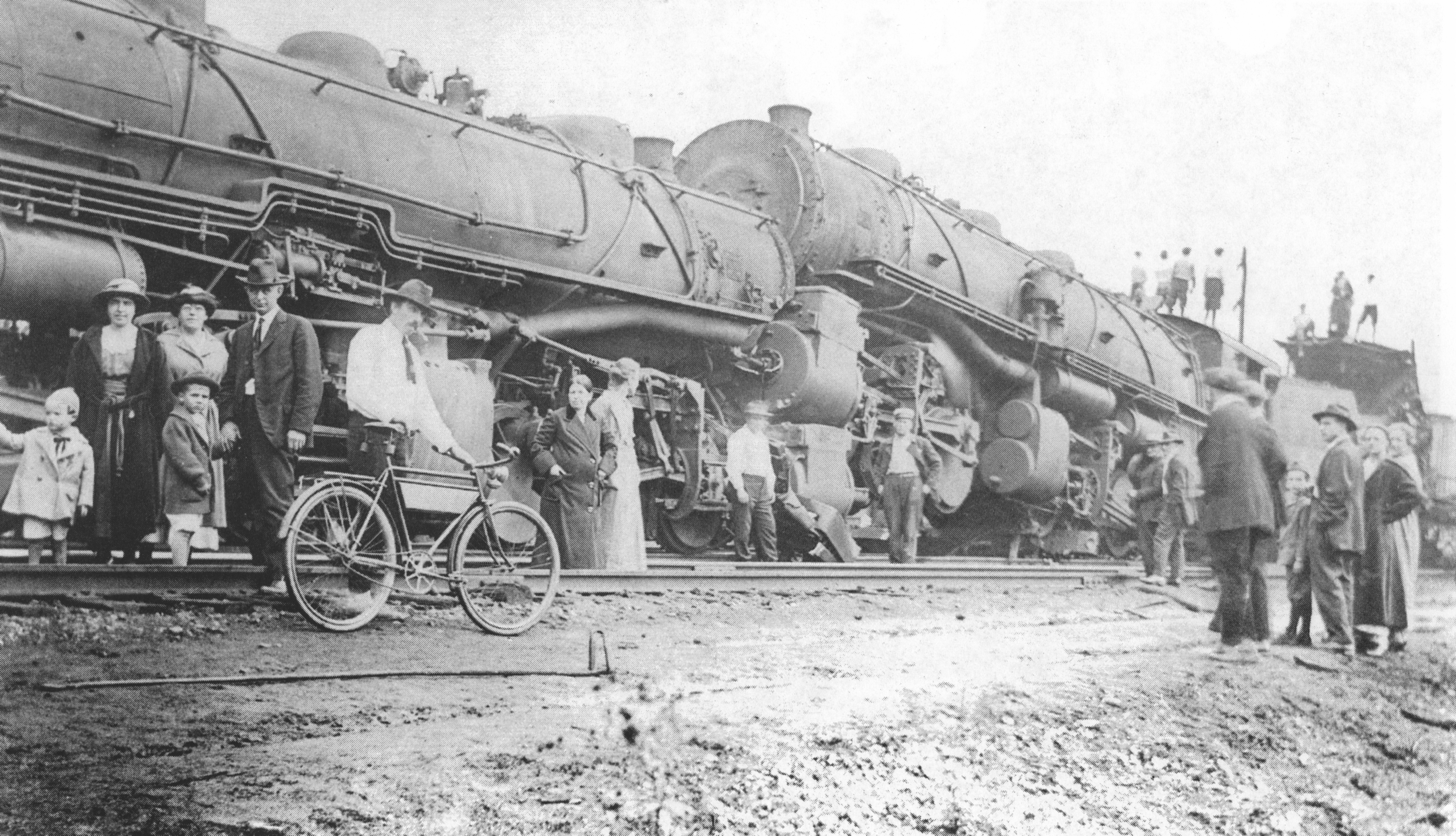
Two 700-series Mallets shared improper intimacies on 12 September 1920 in East Bradford when one engineer somehow failed to see and hear emergency signals and flares. The collision caused very minor injuries to two of the crew of number 716.

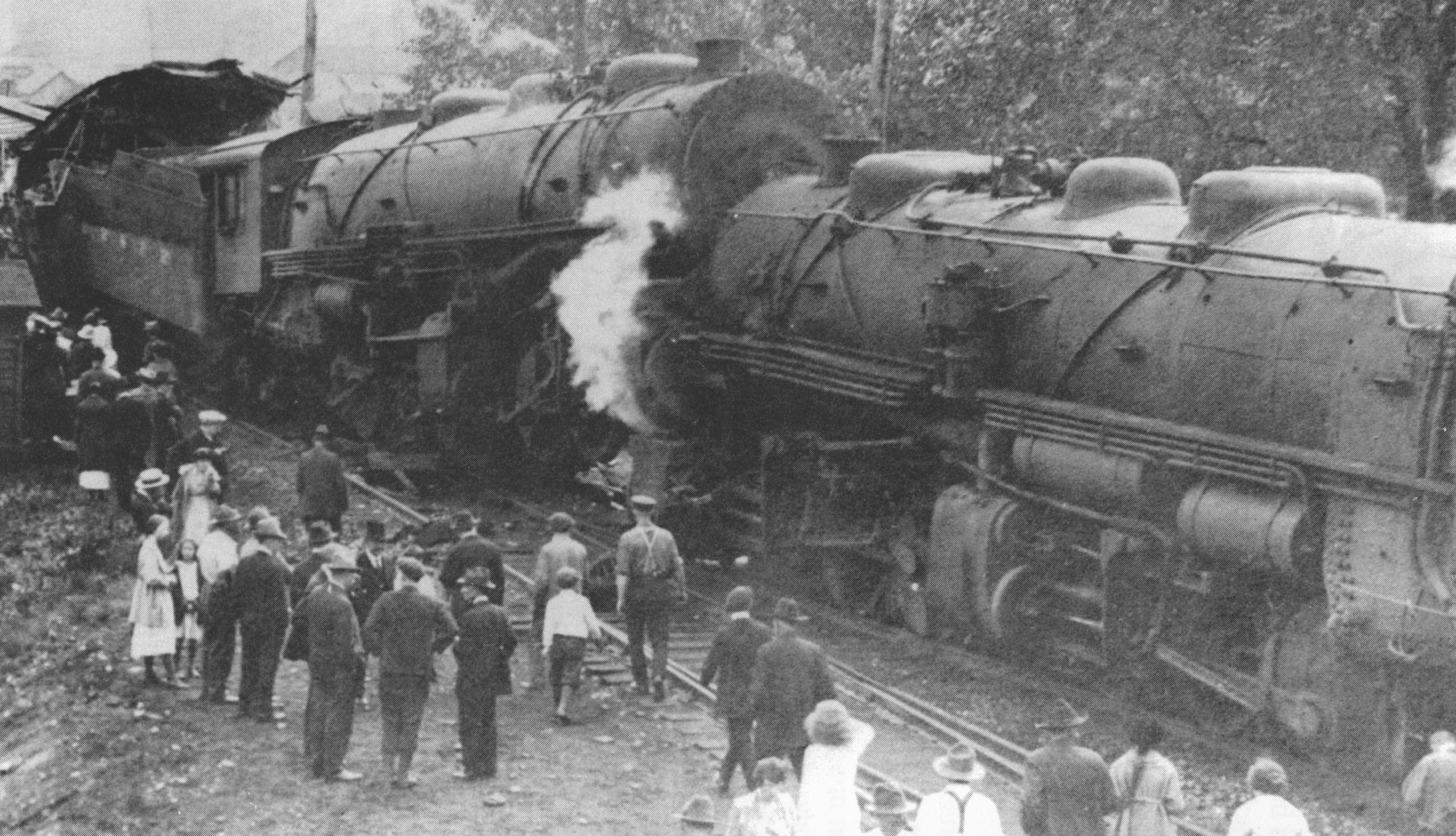
Mallet locomotives 716 and 729 on the southbound track after the twenty mile per hour collision. A conductor had just stepped out of a trackside phone booth when the train hit it. A passing train was just barely caught before it would have hit the wreckage.

Railroads are required not to have accidents, but the historical record shows that they occasionally do. Most accidents are deadly serious, with mere destruction of property if those involved are fortunate and death and injury if they are not. The R&P operated in the days of looser and more tolerant labor practices. In the winter of 1881, the engineer of a southbound oil train approaching the bridge north of Ellicottville stopped upon observing the "settled and bent condition" of the bridge ahead of him. A mail train from Rochester slowed to a stop behind him as he awaited instructions. The conductor of the second train ordered the first engineer to take his engine across to "test" the bridge. The engineer and his locomotive survived the transit, but the bridge settled several inches. While the conductor tried to talk the mail train engineer into shoving the oil cars across the bridge, the ice in the current carried away one of the bridge supports. Time for Plan B. The conductor walked across the bridge and rode the first engine into Ellicottville, where he picked up a boxcar and returned for the mail and passengers. They walked across the bridge and arrived in Salamanca in time to make their connections.

It was less amusing one Sunday morning in July 1883 when an R&P coal train broke in two on a grade of 57 feet (17 m) per mile at Rasselas, twenty-five miles south of Bradford. A not altogether atypical occurrence in the days before reliable couplers, this resulted in seven loaded coal cars and a single passenger car with fifteen to twenty people aboard accelerating back down the grade out of control. The investigation that followed alleged that the conductor and brakeman were both asleep. Neither survived. The runaway string of cars smashed into a train proceeding in the same direction. The engineer of this train saw the cars coming and, with his fireman, leapt off the locomotive after reversing it, surviving with serious bruising. Since the passenger car was the last on the first train, it hit the locomotive at full speed and was split in half. The destroyed passenger car was immediately struck by the coal cars; seven people died, and eight were injured.

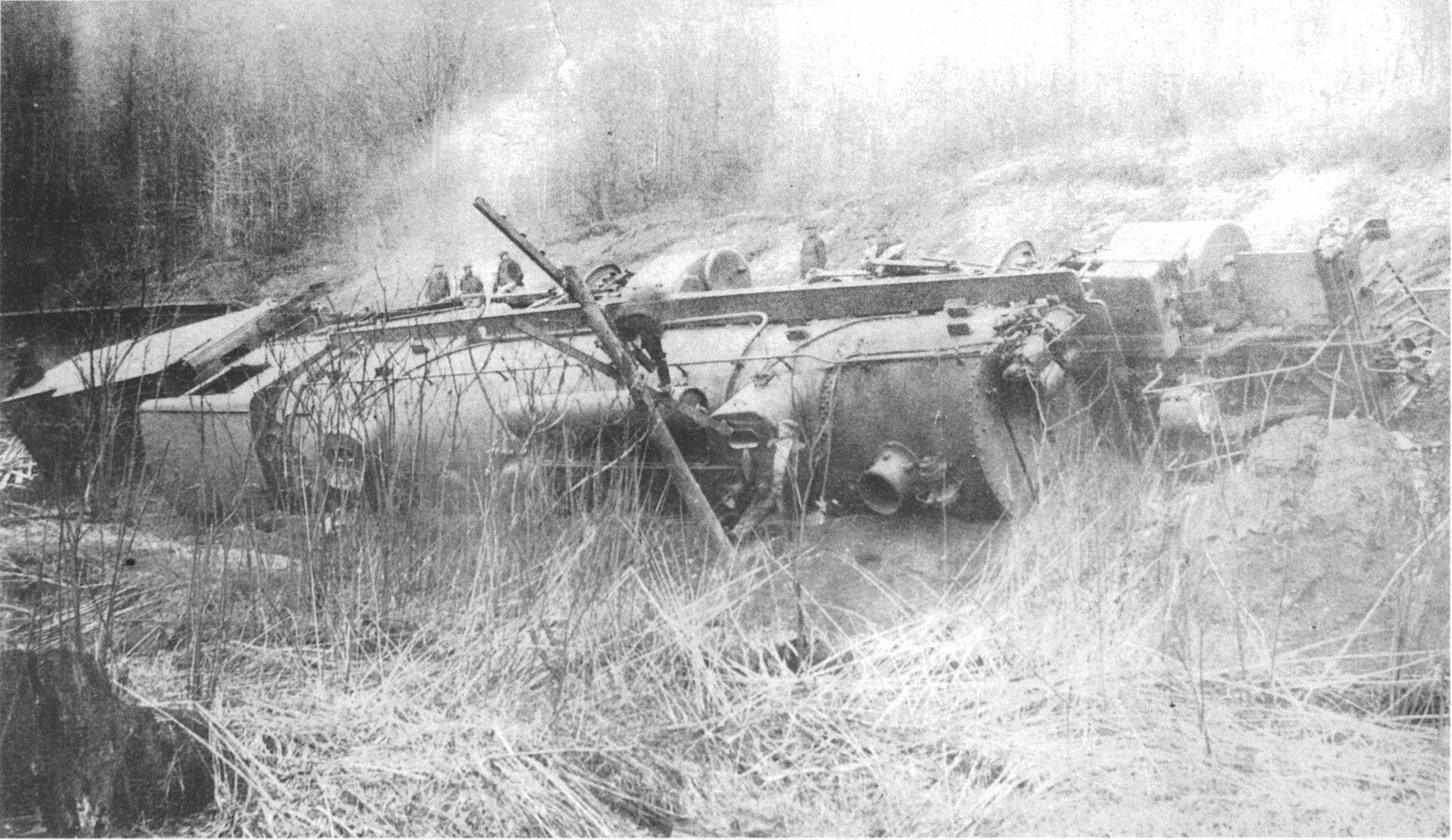
Buffalo, Rochester and Pittsburgh locomotive number 801 after falling off the tracks in Johnsonburg, Pennsylvania, on 19 April 1918

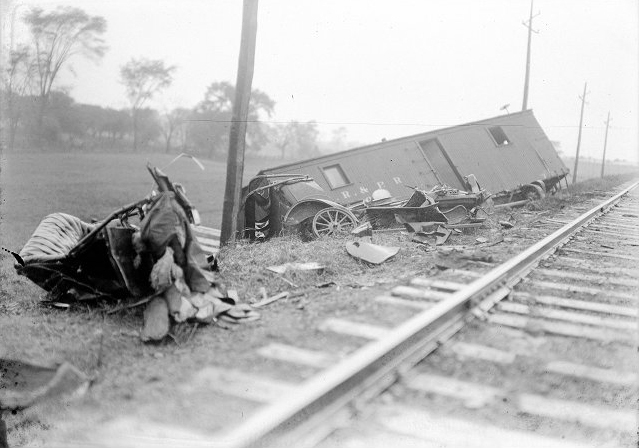
Fatal car accident in Spencerport, New York, involving the BR&P; from the Rochester Herald, October 20, 1917

Even well-run railroads have accidents, and the BR&P had its share. In the final analysis, all accidents result from someone's failure, whether in design, manufacture, construction, operation, or maintenance. The company set its standards higher than most did, but the risks of railroading still took a painful toll.

Some wrecks damaged locomotives and cars, tracks and buildings, and careers, but without the loss of life or the injuries that were common in the period. In late May 1893, two freight trains near Brockwayville, in Jefferson County, Pennsylvania, tried to occupy one space, with predictable results: both locomotives and both trains were totally destroyed. Others had graver consequences. One night in February of that same year, a coal train and a freight train came together because of excessive speed and the inadequate brakes of the day. The newspaper accounts, more graphic than is customary today, gave a blood-chilling picture of what happens to a man crushed in the wreckage and exposed to a continuous blast of live steam. In these harrowing stories, two themes emerge. The trains ran at speeds low enough to allow the crews to leap off when disaster was imminent; and more than one engineer or brakeman remained at his position on the doomed train to the very end, often with fatal consequences.

In other incidents, less noble working behavior led to accidents. In April 1908, an engineer disregarded signals at Rock Glen, leading to a high-speed head-on collision on a curve with another locomotive one mile (1.6 km) north of the station. While no passengers died, the fireman succumbed to steam scalding, dying half an hour after the crash. Criminal charges brought the engineer's arrest for manslaughter. In a more poignant incident in June 1900, engineer William Kation died in a head-on collision between two passenger trains that occurred right in front of his own home, on what was to have been his very last run before retiring. The crash resulted from a simple clerical error in the train orders for that day.

Train crews are forever at the mercy of what others do. In February 1927, a Bradford yard employee left a switch in the wrong position, derailing a passenger train. The fireman was injured but survived; the engineer, who had worked for the line for forty-five years, was close to retirement, and had a reputation as a meticulous and careful worker, was crushed, scalded, and dismembered when the locomotive overturned. (See photo above)

Some disasters are the fruit of errors made years before, as in bridges not built or maintained properly. In the BR&P East Salamanca yard on 28 August 1911, a slow freight train toppled off a bridge the south abutment of which failed. The engineer saw the rails tipping slowly and yelled to the fireman to jump. He and the brakeman survived the plunge into the water, but the fireman did not. In the news reports, railroad officials expressed gratitude that the next train on the line, a passenger run, had not been the one to encounter the collapsing bridge. They also claimed that the bridge had been in good working order all along and that the high water in Great Valley Creek had done the damage. Fifteen minutes prior to the collapse, two freight trains had passed on the bridge with no hint of trouble. (See photo above.)

Sometimes it was bad judgment, other times it was just bad luck: When the line acquired its Mallets in 1917, they naturally gave thought to how the weight of these machines would affect the existing trackage. Some work was done strengthening bridges and railworks, but it proved not wholly adequate. On 19 April 1918, the BR&P ran a very heavy Mallet over a light track north of Clarion Junction near Johnsonburg, Pennsylvania. The result of the rails spreading apart under the weight of the 280 ton engine was an upside-down locomotive (see photo above). This was not a rare occurrence, as these 800-series Mallets were not only the heaviest that the Buffalo, Rochester and Pittsburgh Railway operated, they were the heaviest ever used in normal service in the entire area. Less than two weeks earlier, number 806 had suffered the same ignominy when the railbed beneath her gave way on Clarion Hill. The crew sent to retrieve the engine simply tied a set of rails onto the locomotive's 57-inch (1,400 mm) drivers and then rolled it upright onto a temporary roadbed, using three cranes. This temporary rail was then tied into the main line, enabling the number 806 to slink back home for repairs.

== Acquisition by B&O ==
Officially, the end came in 1932, when the line was absorbed into the Baltimore and Ohio Railroad, giving the B&O increased access to New York State. (They already had a toe-hold with their acquisition of the Staten Island Rapid Transit at the other end of the state.)

The acquisition exemplified the endless machinations of the railroad era. For a while, the Van Sweringen brothers wanted the BR&P, and Iselin was pleased to make the divestiture in 1928. The sale value of the company had been inflated by the contention between the Delaware and Hudson and the Baltimore and Ohio for the Buffalo, Rochester and Pittsburgh Railway, making its sale a compelling decision for Iselin. The Pennsylvania coalfields were waning, thanks to non-union mines in Kentucky and West Virginia, and the revenues from the railroad had fallen correspondingly.

The D&H wanted westward routes, and the BR&P figured in their plans. The B&O had routes that the Van Sweringens wanted, making a swap attractive to both companies. The ICC now regulated the railroads with a tight grip, (Note: It wanted to tie weak railroads to strong ones in order to enhance diversification and competition.) and its view was that the B&O proposal to buy the BR&P would serve shippers better than would the D&H plan to lease the company's lines.

The B&O agreed in March 1929 to the purchase of the BR&P from the Alleghany Corporation, getting ICC approval in February of the following year. The deal yielded the B&O the BR&P, the Buffalo and Susquehanna Railroad, and the Mt Jewett, Kinzua, and Riterville. It gave the Van Sweringens the Wheeling and Lake Erie. The formal hand-over occurred on 1 January 1932, forever ending the Buffalo, Rochester and Pittsburgh Railway as an operating entity. However, the corporation continued to exist on paper. Because there were still shareholders with a minority interest in the company, the BR&P continued to exist through to the CSX era because of outstanding unclaimed shares of the railroad. Watson Hill Brown, the investment banker who helped finance and reorganize the Rochester & Pittsburgh Coal Co. in 1881 and take control of the Rochester & State Line Railroad had died in 1928 before he could cash in his shares for B&O stock. Under the Abandoned & Unclaimed Property Act in the state of Pennsylvania (where the BR&P had been incorporated), CSX was permitted to make payment to the state’s Bureau of Unclaimed Property, in lieu of actually buying out the one share of BR&P stock owned by the estate of Brown. After an exhaustive search revealed no living heirs, payment was made, CSX became the sole owner of BR&P, and the company was merged on 21 December 2013.

== Historic sites ==
A number of Buffalo, Rochester and Pittsburgh Railway stations are listed on the National Register of Historic Places. They are:

- Buffalo, Rochester & Pittsburgh Railway Indiana Passenger Station in Indiana, Pennsylvania
- Buffalo, Rochester and Pittsburgh Railroad Station (Springville, New York) in Springville, New York
- Brockwayville Passenger Depot, Buffalo, Rochester and Pittsburgh Railroad in Brockway, Pennsylvania
- Buffalo, Rochester and Pittsburgh Railroad Station (Orchard Park, New York) in Orchard Park, New York.
