= Springville station =

- Buffalo, Rochester & Pittsburgh Railroad Station
- U.S. National Register of Historic Places
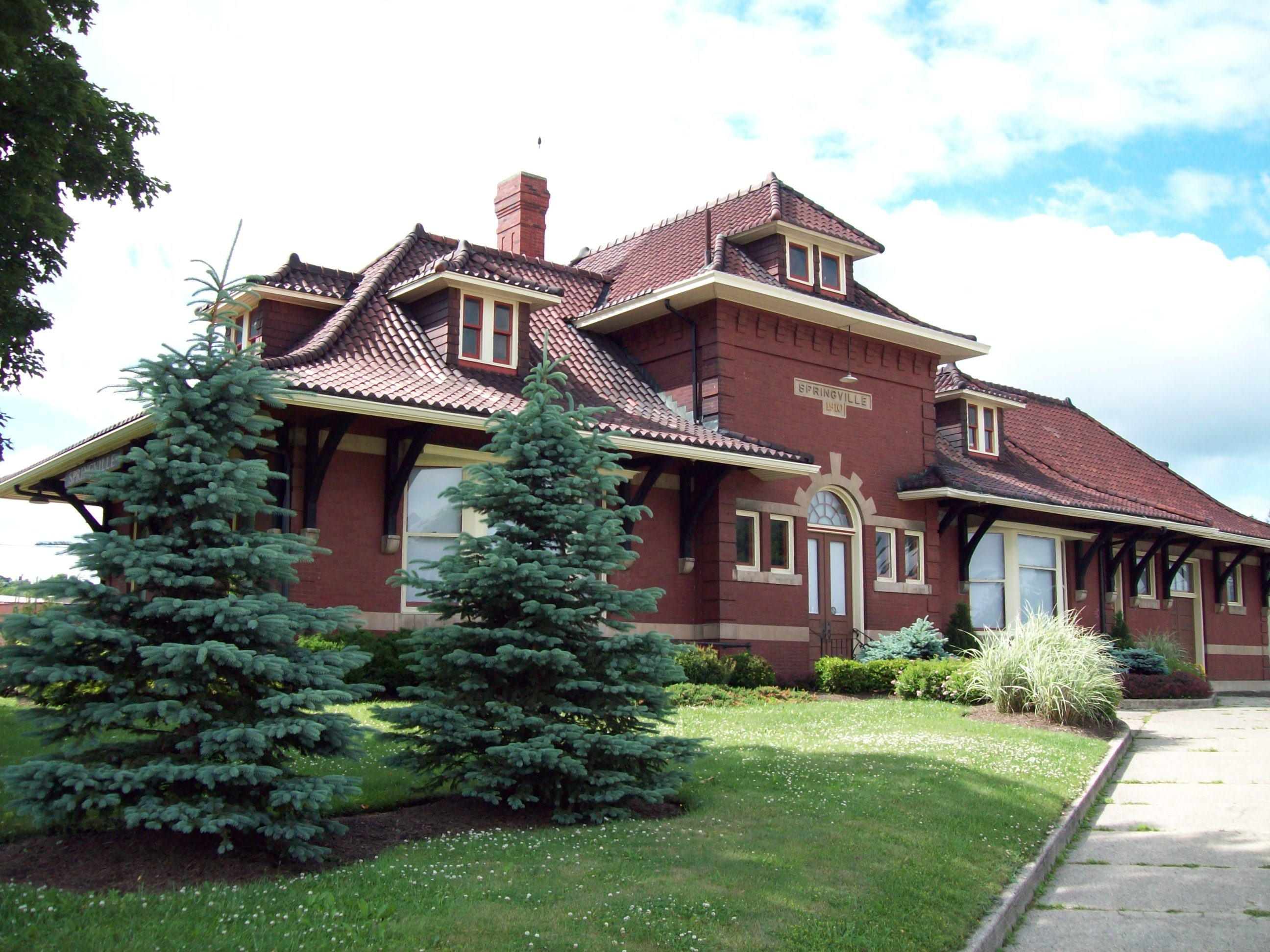
- Buffalo, Rochester and Pittsburgh Railroad Station, Springville, NY, June 2009

- Location within New York Location within the United States
- Location: 227 W. Main St., Springville, New York
- Coordinates: 42°30′34″N 78°40′31″W
- Area: 1.3 acres (0.53 ha)
- Built: 1910
- Architectural style: Late 19th And 20th Century Revivals
- NRHP reference No.: 91001669
- Added to NRHP: November 7, 1991

Springville station is a historic train station located at Springville, Erie County, New York. It was built in 1910 by the Buffalo, Rochester and Pittsburgh Railway, and is a 1 1/2-story, rectangular brick building with a hipped roof. It consists of a central two-story tower section flanked by wings.

The Baltimore and Ohio Railroad operated both daytime and nighttime trains through the station on the BR&P route between Lackawanna Terminal in Buffalo and Baltimore and Ohio Station in Pittsburgh. Additionally, the company operated a local Buffalo to DuBois, Pennsylvania train through the station. The B&O last had passenger trains using the station in 1955 in daytime runs between Pittsburgh and Buffalo.

The building was listed on the National Register of Historic Places in 1991 as the Buffalo, Rochester and Pittsburgh Railroad Station.

Preceding station	Baltimore and Ohio Railroad	Following station
West Valley toward Pittsburgh	Buffalo, Rochester and Pittsburgh Railway	East Concord toward Buffalo
