= Orchard Park station =

Orchard Park
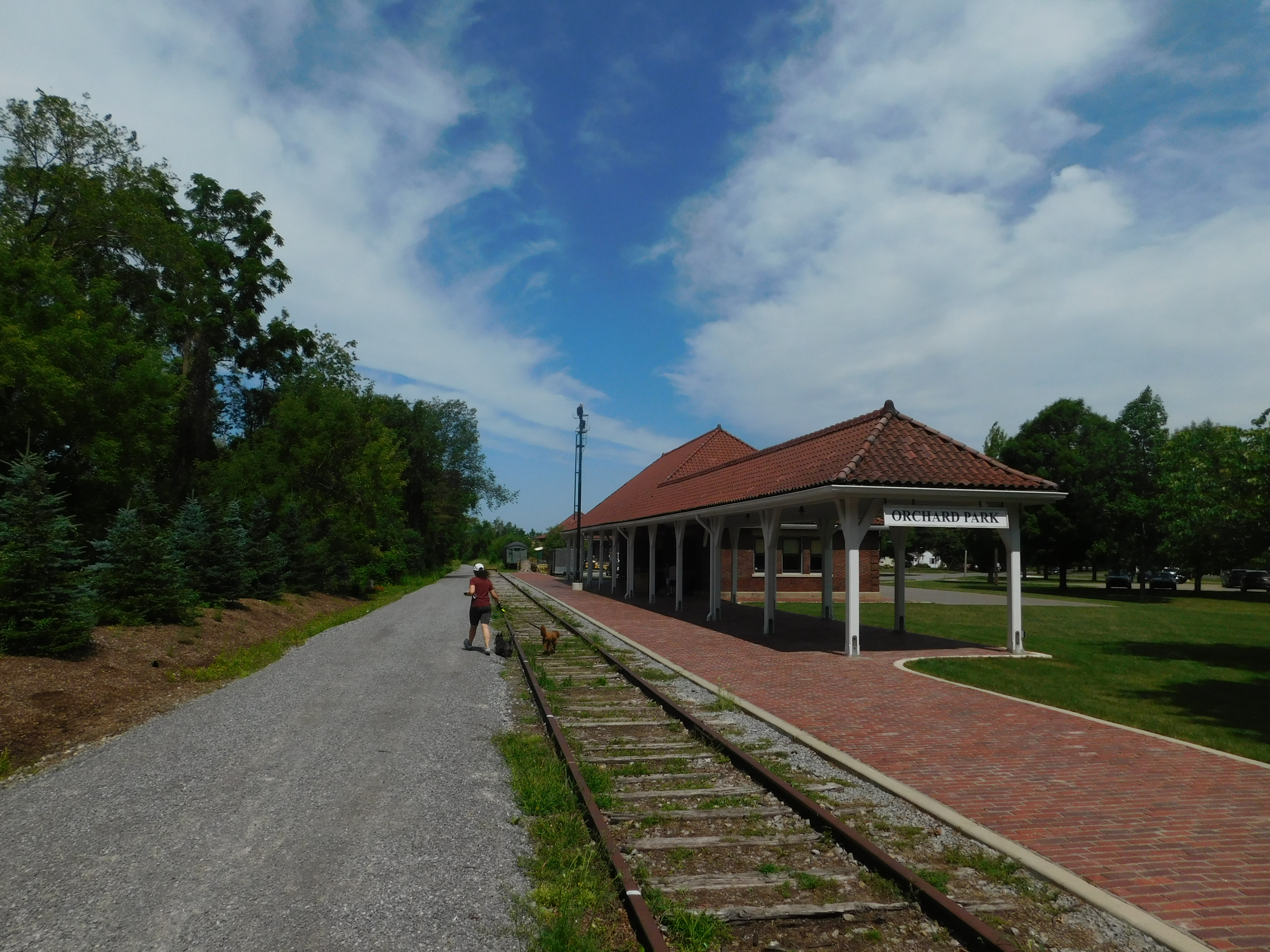
- Orchard Park station in July 2023, after opening of the local rail trail.

General information
- Location: 2 Highland Avenue, Orchard Park, New York 14127
- Line: Buffalo, Rochester and Pittsburgh Railway
- Platforms: 1 side platform
- Tracks: 2

History
- Electrified: Not electrified

Services
Preceding station	Baltimore and Ohio Railroad	Following station
Jewettville toward Pittsburgh	Buffalo, Rochester and Pittsburgh Railway	Lackawanna toward Buffalo
- Buffalo, Rochester and Pittsburgh Railway Station
- U.S. National Register of Historic Places
- Location within New York Location within the United States
- Location: 395 South Lincoln Avenue, Orchard Park, New York
- Coordinates: 42°45′30.757″N 78°44′49.887″W
- Area: less than one acre
- Built: 1911
- Architect: BR&P Railroad; Richardson, H.H.
- NRHP reference No.: 07000871
- Added to NRHP: August 30, 2007
Location

Orchard Park station is a historic railway station located at Orchard Park in Erie County, New York. It was constructed in 1911 and served passenger trains until the 1950s.

== History ==
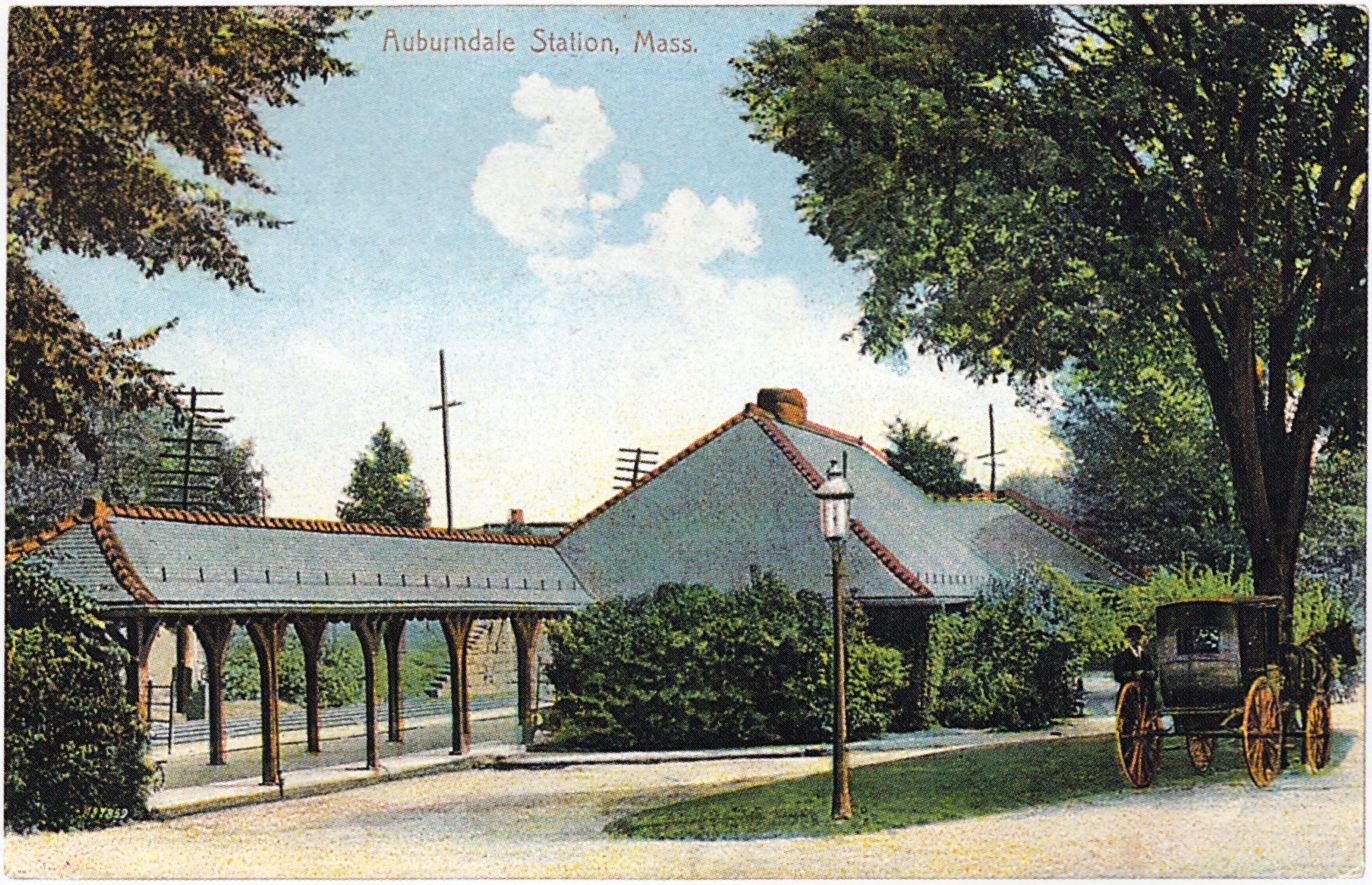
Orchard Park station was based on the 1881 station in Auburndale, Massachusetts, seen here on an early color postcard

The property includes the passenger depot and brick freight house both constructed in 1911, tracks, a concrete bumper post, a semaphore signal, a portion of the entrance drive, and four period rail cars. The station's plan is based largely on one designed by Henry Hobson Richardson for the 1884 station at Auburndale, Massachusetts, which was demolished in 1961 after 80 years in service.

When the Buffalo, Rochester and Pittsburgh Railway (BR&P) was acquired by the Baltimore and Ohio Railroad, Orchard Park Station became a B&O station. It was a flag stop on day and nighttime trains on the BRP route between Lackawanna Terminal in Buffalo and Baltimore and Ohio Station in Pittsburgh. The B&O terminated passenger service in 1955, eight years before the Chesapeake and Ohio Railway took financial control of the B&O. Freight service operated from Orchard Park until 1979. The station was listed on the National Register of Historic Places in 2007 as the Buffalo, Rochester and Pittsburgh Railroad Station.
