= Indiana station (Pennsylvania) =

- Buffalo, Rochester & Pittsburgh Railway Indiana Passenger Station
- U.S. National Register of Historic Places
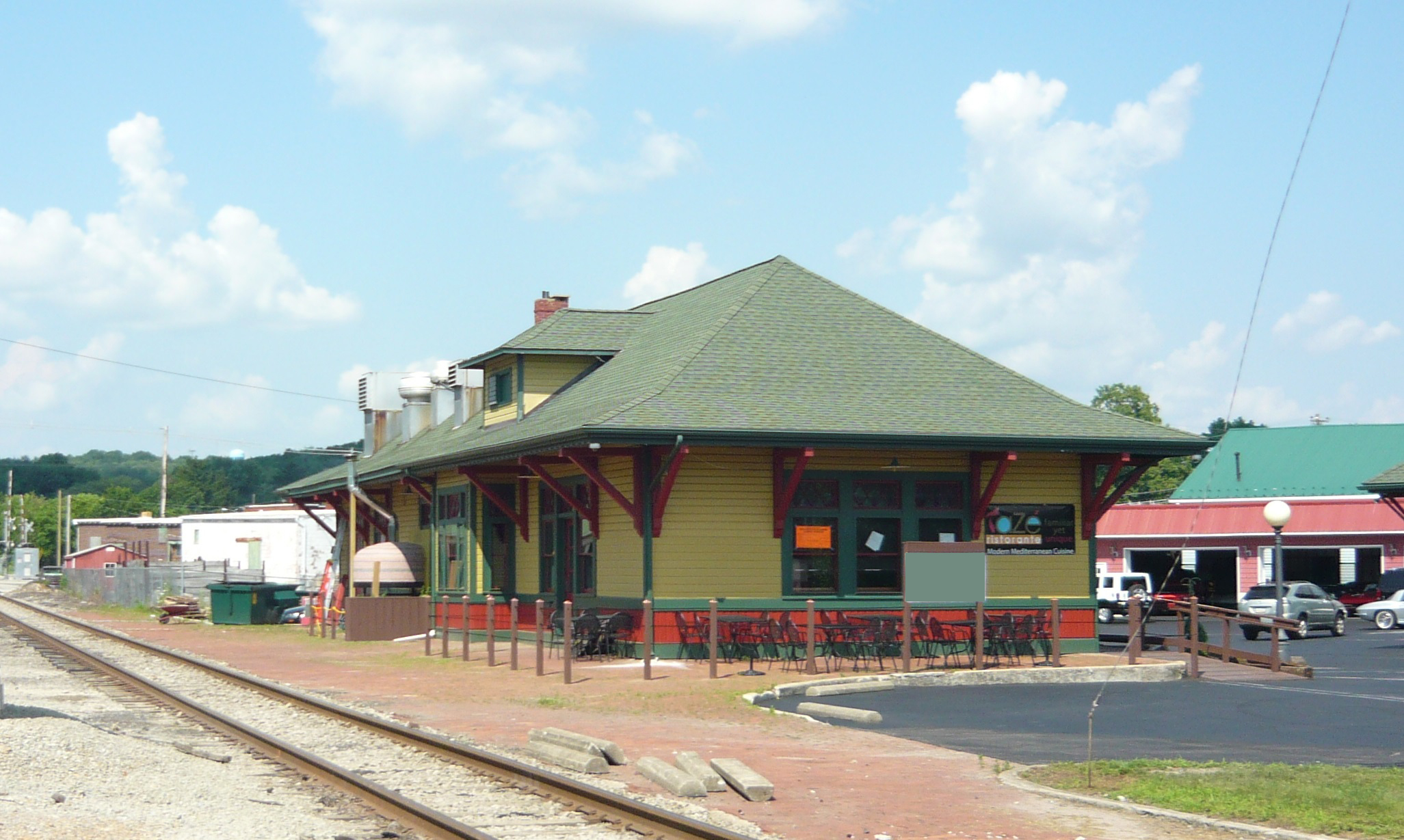
- Indiana Railroad station. Buffalo and Pittsburgh Railroad tracks in foreground.

- Location within Pennsylvania Location within the United States
- Location: 1125 Philadelphia Street, Indiana, Pennsylvania
- Coordinates: 40°37′24″N 79°9′42″W
- Area: 0.4 acres (0.16 ha)
- Built: 1904
- NRHP reference No.: 93000365
- Added to NRHP: May 10, 1993

The Indiana station is a historic American railway station which is located in Indiana, Indiana County, Pennsylvania.

It was added to the National Register of Historic Places in 1993 as the Buffalo, Rochester & Pittsburgh Railway Indiana Passenger Station.

== History and architectural features ==
Built by the Buffalo, Rochester and Pittsburgh Railway in 1904, this historic structure is a 1 1/2-story, wood-frame building with weatherboard siding which was designed in a railroad vernacular-style. It features a generous overhang on all four sides. It housed a restaurant named Tazé until mid-2016.

| Preceding station | Baltimore and Ohio Railroad | Following station |
|---|---|---|
| Terminus | Indiana – Punxsutawney | Ernest toward Punxsutawney |
