= Joe Hughes =

Joe Hughes may refer to:

- Joe Hughes (baseball) (1880–1951), baseball player for the Chicago Cubs
- Joe Hughes (footballer) (1898–?), Welsh professional footballer
- Joe Hughes (British Army soldier) (died 1946), British recipient of the George Cross
- Joe Hughes (footballer, born 1901) (1901-1983), Welsh footballer, see List of Bury F.C. players (1–24 appearances)
- Joe "Guitar" Hughes (1937–2003), American blues musician
- Joe Hughes (quarterback), born c. 1972, Wyoming Cowboys quarterback
- Joe Hughes (boxer) (born 1990), British boxer

== See also ==
- Joseph Hughes (disambiguation)
