= Joseph Hughes =

Joseph Hughes may refer to:

- Joseph Hughes (footballer) (1891–1966), English footballer
- Joseph Hughes (GC) (died 1946), recipient of the George Cross
- Joseph Hughes (musician), former member of The Flys and The Lover Speaks
- Joseph Hughes (politician) (1905–1960), Irish Fine Gael politician
- Joseph Henry Hughes (1857–1917), Canadian politician
- Joseph "Joe" Hughes, suspect in the point-and-click adventure game, Nancy Drew: The Final Scene

== See also ==
- Joe Hughes (disambiguation)
- Hughes (surname)
