= Mary Emelia Moore =

New Zealand Presbyterian missionary

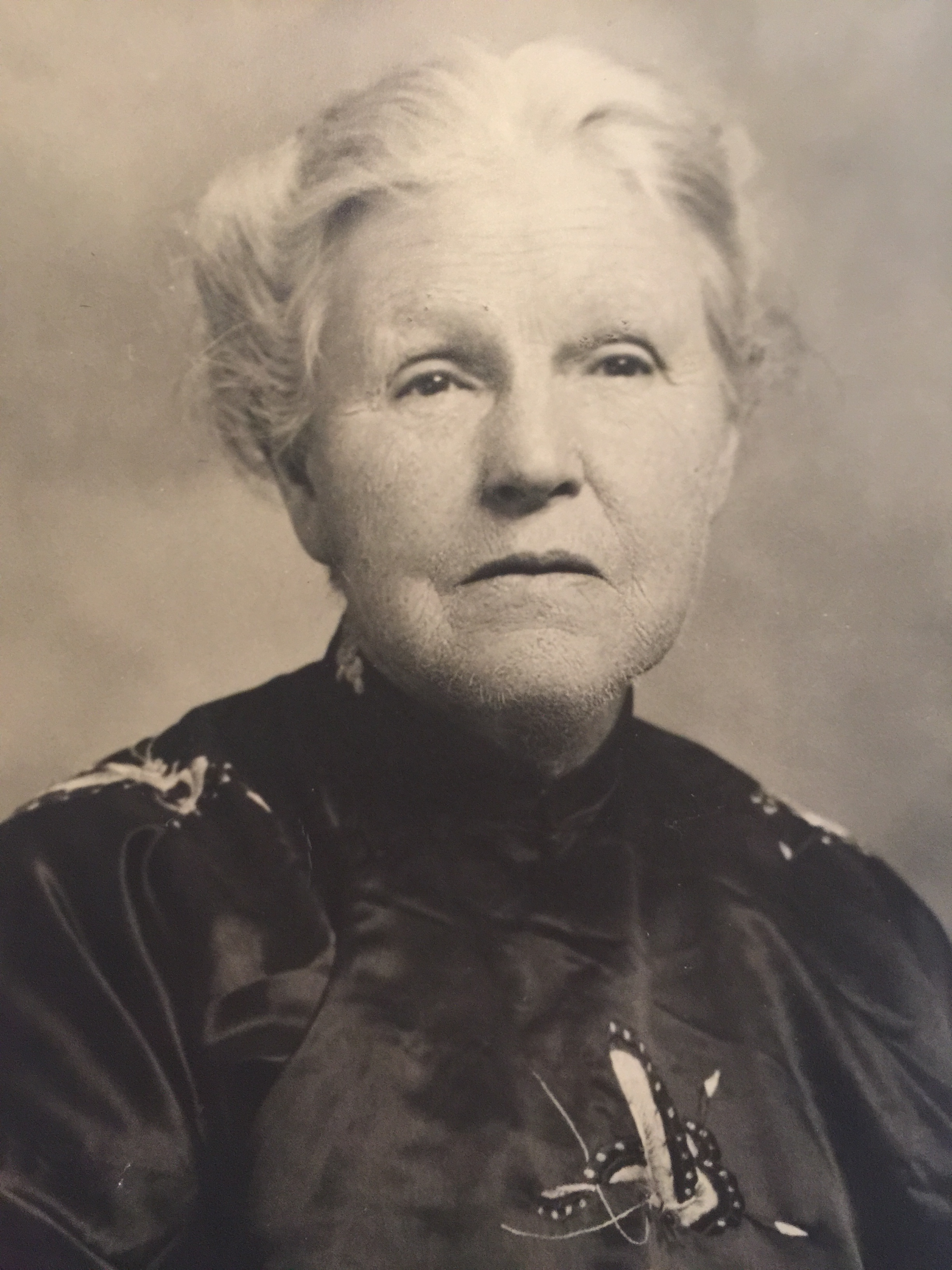
- Moore, c. 1939
- Born: March 7, 1869; Dunedin, Otago, New Zealand
- Died: May 17, 1951 (aged 82); Dunedin, Otago, New Zealand
- Education: University of Otago
- Occupations: Missionary - Yichang, China
- Years active: 53 years
- Children: 2
- Church: Church of Scotland
- Title: Head of Yichang Ladies Mission

Mary Emelia Moore (7 March 1869–17 May 1951) was a New Zealand Presbyterian missionary in China from 1897 to 1948 for the Church of Scotland Yichang Mission. She dedicated her life to the improvement of conditions for Chinese women as Head of the Ladies’ Mission. Over the course of her service, she acquired property for a women's compound and expanded its outreach to women and children. At its peak, the women's campus included Iona Girls’ Boarding School, Buchanan Women's Hospital, an orphanage, and a women's vocational center and training school.

== Early life ==
Moore was born in Dunedin, New Zealand on 7 March 1869, the oldest of eight children. She attended Knox Church, Dunedin just down the road from her alma mater, University of Otago where she earned a BA in 1893. As a member of the Otago Sunday School Union, the ladies’ committee of the Otago University Christian Alliance and the Otago University Debating Society, Moore developed leadership skills that would serve her well in China. In 1896, the Yichang Church of Scotland Mission had no full-time women missionaries and when calls for single women in Scotland went unanswered, the mission turned to New Zealand to make their appeal. Mary Emelia Moore and Catherine Graham Fraser both signed up to the mission as school teachers.

== China ==
Moore and Fraser arrived in Yichang by January 1897 and began language training. Both worked tirelessly to advance the education and well-being of Chinese women. Street life belonged to boys and men whereas Chinese girls and women, many of whom had bound feet, were confined to the Chinese home. Both Moore and Fraser saw the benefit of creating a girls’ boarding school whereby girls and young women could receive an education without the social stigma of walking to and from school in public. They also expanded a women's training school by teaching lace making and embroidery. In addition to providing income to Chinese women, these items were sold to parishioners in Scotland and New Zealand and funded a large portion of the women's mission expenses, making much of the work self-sustaining. The Church of Scotland had many foreign missions across the globe competing for funding. Moore had the advantage of leveraging her network in New Zealand for reliable support, which contributed to the success and expansion of the Women's Mission over the years.

New Zealand forged a deeper connection to Yichang when Catherine Graham Fraser's sister, Isabel, visited the mission in 1904. Isabel returned to New Zealand with seeds from the Chinese gooseberry, thereby introducing New Zealand to what was later renamed the Kiwifruit. Yichang was a vibrant treaty port and transportation hub between Upper and Lower Yangtze River trade. Lower river ships would drop passengers and goods in Yichang to await Upper Yangtze River transportation through the Three Gorges, which required different ships and navigational expertise. Captain Samuel Cornell Plant successfully opened the Upper Yangtze River to steamship trade in 1909, creating more river traffic and trade through Yichang. The city population grew exponentially during this surge.

Throughout Moore's lifetime in China, she witnessed political instability, catastrophic flooding and outbreaks of disease, violence and two wars. She improved as many lives as she could touch during her years of service. After mandatory retirement in 1933, Moore continued to live and volunteer at the mission with her efforts focused on prisoners and the blind. She also helped manage and care for the millions of refugees passing through Yichang towards west China during the Second Sino-Japanese War from 1937 – 1945. Moore fled to Chengdu in 1939 to join her two daughters. At the end of World War II, Moore returned to Yichang to recover what was left of her burnt out mission and to re-open her school. She later traveled to Shanghai and left China permanently in 1948 just ahead of the communist victory during the Chinese Civil War between the communists and the nationalists. Between 1948 and 1950, Moore traveled around the world, making stops in Scotland and New York to see her daughter, Isobel, before returning to New Zealand. Just months after her arrival home to New Zealand, Moore died from tuberculosis at age 82.

== Personal life ==
In 1921, at age 52, Moore became legal guardian and trustee for two young Eurasian girls, Isobel and Clara Qian, who were biological daughters of Sichuan's Commissioner of Foreign Affairs, Qian Weishan, and his English wife, Adela Robina Warburton. Captain Samuel Cornell Plant and his wife, Alice, had first adopted Isobel and Clara Qian but in 1921 when traveling on home leave with the Plants to England, Isobel and Clara were orphaned when both Plants developed pneumonia aboard the ship and died. Mary Emelia Moore became guardian and trustee of a trust fund given to the girls from Captain Plant's estate through the Plant Memorial Fund. Moore raised Isobel and Clara Qian as her own children until her death in 1951. She never married.
