= Shanghai Xinbao =

Chinese newspaper

Shanghai Xinbao 上海新报
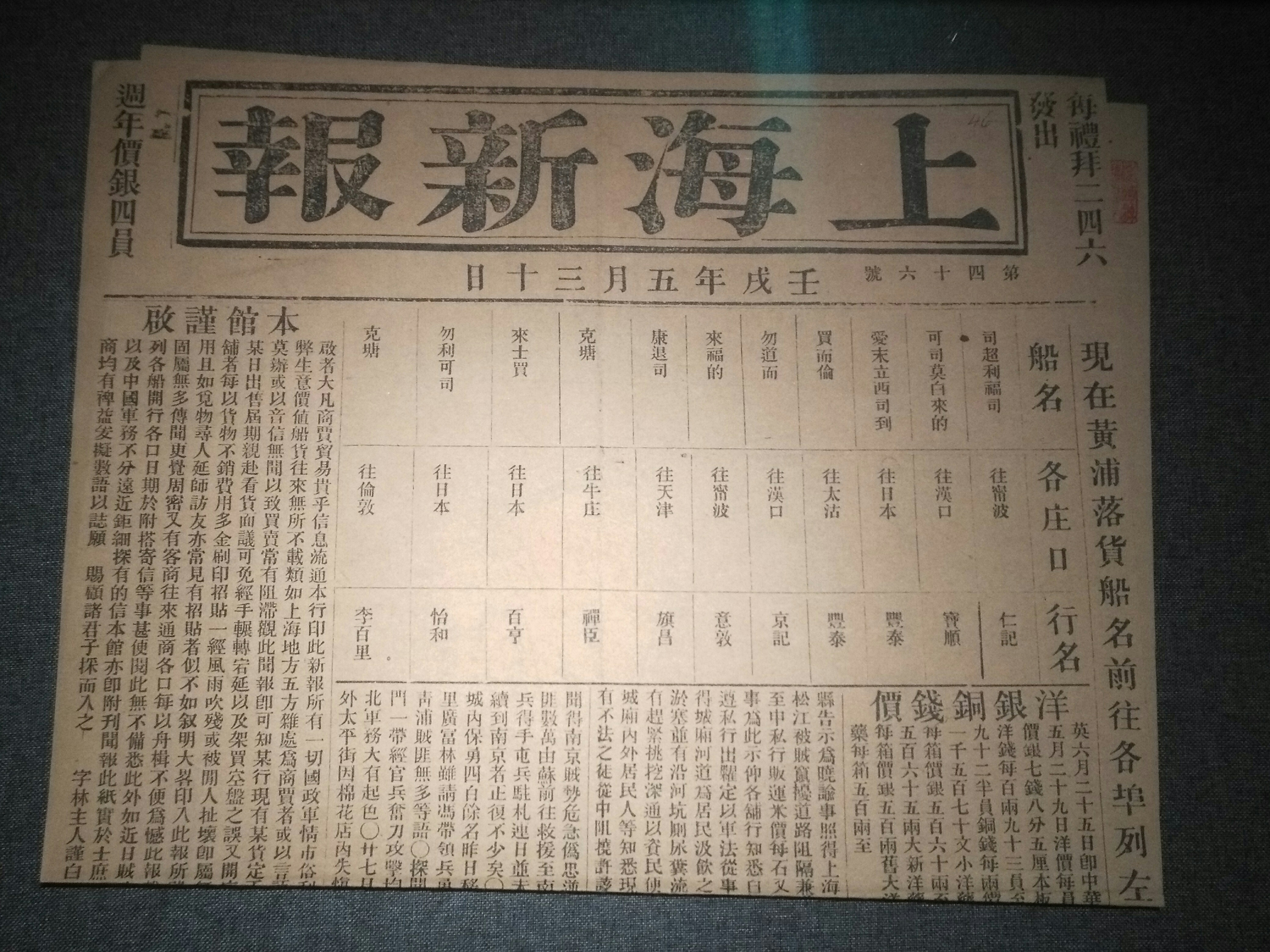
- May 13, 1862 issue
- Founder: R. Alexander Jamieson
- Founded: November 1861
- Ceased publication: December 31, 1872
- Language: Chinese
- Headquarters: Shanghai
- OCLC number: 838624146

Shanghai Xinbao (Chinese: 上海新报), also known as Shanghai Gazette or Shanghai New Daily or Shanghai Hsinpao or Shanghai News, was a commercial Chinese newspaper established in Shanghai in November 1861, edited successively by Marquis L. Wood, John Fryer and Young John Allen, which was based on the news reports translated from the North China Daily News.

The newspaper, founded by R. Alexander Jamieson, was the first Chinese language newspaper in Shanghai. It covered mostly in commercial and shipping news, with a small circulation confined to the Chinese merchants of the port.

From time to time, Shanghai Xinbao published limited but focused political news. The early focus was on the Taiping Rebellion, which increased its sales figures dramatically. On December 31, 1872, it ceased publication after a long-term competitive failure with the Shen Bao.
