= Springville-Griffith Institute Central School District =

School district in the U.S. state of New York

Springville-Griffith Institute Central School District is a Central School District in rural New York State. Located 35 minutes south of Buffalo, the district consists of the communities of Collins, Colden, Glenwood, Concord, East Concord, and Springville.

== School history ==
Springville's school honors the name of Archibald Griffith who raised a seminary from a position of uncertainty to one of prominence. In 1867 the name of the Academy was changed to Griffith Institute, in consideration of his liberal donation. Later he gave $10,000 to the Institute. SGI History Article

Springville-Griffith Institute CSD Campus

There are approximately 1,800 students enrolled in the four schools that comprise the Springville-Griffith Institute Central School District. Springville Elementary (K-5) is located in Springville and Colden Elementary (K-5) in Colden, with average class sizes in the low 20s. Griffith Institute Middle School (Grades 6-8) and Griffith Institute High School (Grades 9-12), are both located in Springville, with average class sizes in the low 20s. The District Office and bus garage, which houses the District's fleet of 45 school buses, are also located in Springville.

School Governance

The School is governed by federal and state laws, regulations and policies. The remaining actions are set through policies of the Board of Education (BOE). For the purposes of the school, policies have the force of law. Policies are voted on by its five members. Every action must carry with three votes, even if not all five members are present. Members of the Board of Education are elected to terms of three years and serve without pay. They are responsible for district finances and for formulating educational and school district policies. The Board holds meetings at least monthly on Tuesdays at 7 p.m. at the high school at 290 North Buffalo Street unless otherwise announced. Regular meetings may be canceled and special meetings may be called by vote of the Board. Notification of meetings is given in accordance with the provisions of the Open Meetings Law.

Springville-Griffith Institute CSD Timeline

1830 - Academic School building built

1849 - First person to graduate

1867 - Name change from Academy to Griffith Institute - Addition to building, making three stories and bell tower - North and south district united

1885 - Building was enlarged to twice its size

1889 - Gaylord and Ultrich property purchased with a hotel on property. The 1st, 2nd and 3rd grade was moved there and the public library- called G-I Annex

1909 - New school was opened at a cost of $75,000; Bell was rung for the last time

1918 - First orchestra

1920 - Parents’ night started - (PTA)

1930 - Centennial celebration- old academy bell was brought out for celebration

1933 - Organized football squad

1941 - Central School added to name. 18 surrounding school districts united as one - 1st Board of Education formed (5 members)

1941-1953 - An additional 15 rural districts were annexed to form a complete community school, one of the largest in the state

1952 - Board of Education enlarged to 7 members - High School built and opened for student use

1964 - North Wing of high school built and opened for students

1965 - South Wing of high school built and opened for students

1973 - Name changed from Griffith Institute and Central School to Springville-Griffith Institute Central School District

1976 - Middle School opened

2002 - Addition added to high school
