= Henrietta Hall Shuck =

American missionary (1817–1844)

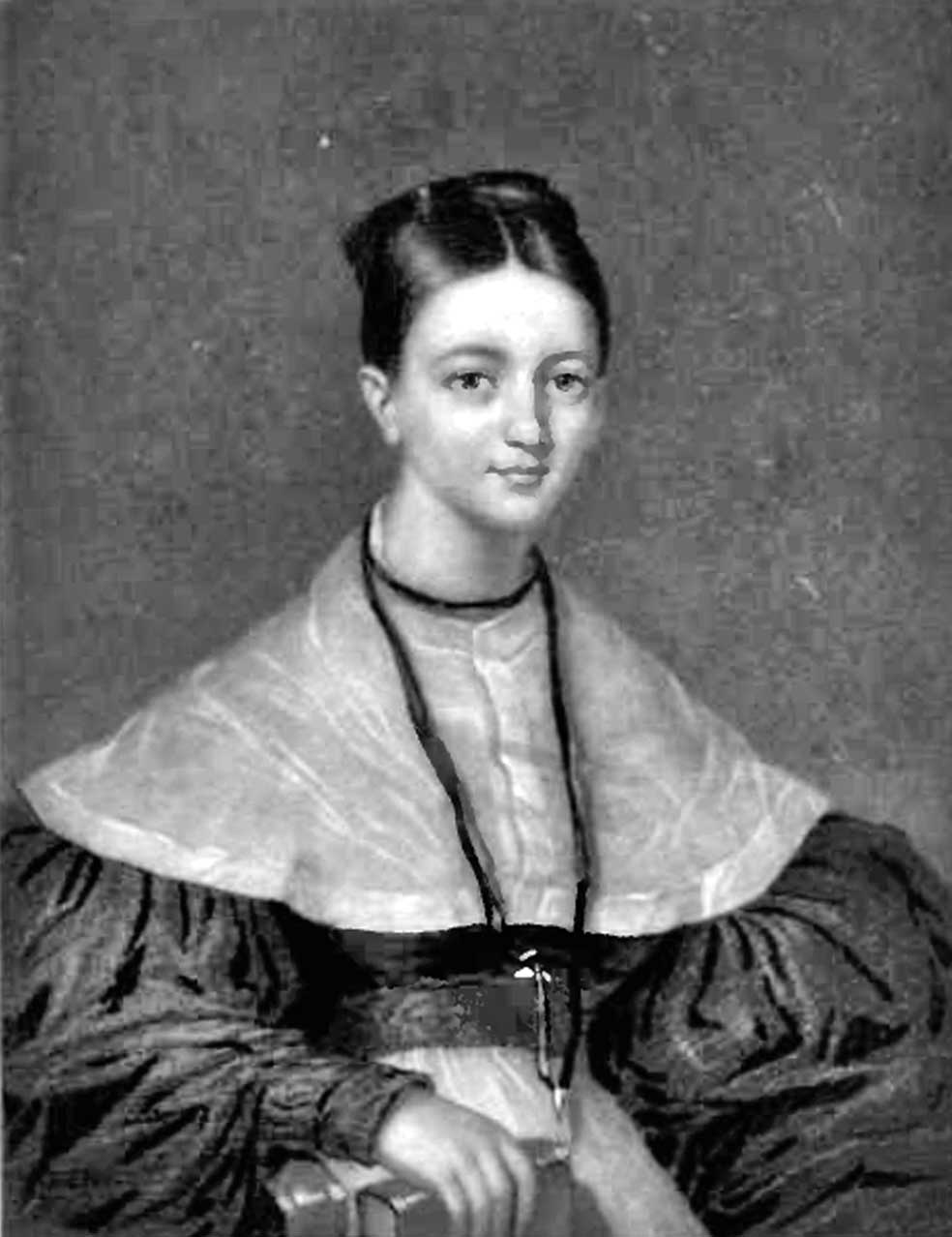
- Missionary to China
- Born: October 28, 1817; Kilmarnock, Virginia, US
- Died: November 27, 1844 (aged 27); British Hong Kong

Signature
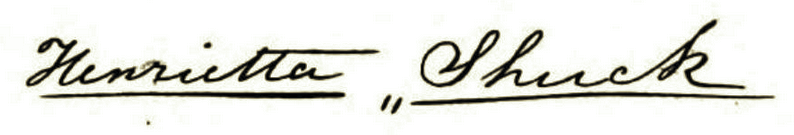

Henrietta Hall Shuck (28 October 1817 – 27 November 1844) was the first American female missionary to China and the first Western woman to live in Hong Kong.

== Early and family life ==
Henrietta was born in Kilmarnock, Virginia, to Colonel Addison Hall (1797–1871) and his wife. At 13 she was sent to a girls' school in Fredericksburg, Virginia. She was baptised at a camp meeting sponsored by Morattico Baptist Church at age 14.

After moving to Richmond, Virginia, upon the death of her mother, Henrietta studied at the Classical and English School and taught Sunday School at the First Baptist Church in Richmond. She met Jehu Lewis Shuck of Lewisburg, Greenbrier County, a student at the Baptist Seminary. Both belonged to the American Baptist Board for Foreign Missions. Rev. Shuck and his fellow student Robert Dunlavy Davenport (1809–1848) were ordained on August 30, and each married on 18 September 1835. Henrietta was 17 years old and her friend Mary Frances Greenhow Roper (1819–1896) just 15.

== Career ==
Days after both couples were set apart for foreign missions at a service conducted at Richmond's First Baptist Church, they embarked for China (and Siam for the Davenports). They stopped in Burma and Henrietta visited the grave of Ann Judson (whose memoirs had inspired her), but did not meet her husband Rev. Adoniram Judson. Their ship reached Singapore in March, 1836, where Henrietta gave birth to their first child, Lewis (named for her father and grandfather), and the Davenports sailed to Bangkok.

In September 1836, the small Shuck family arrived in Macao, about 90 miles from Canton, and where the Chinese government allowed foreigners. The missionaries worked there about six years, until the end of the first Opium War (1839–1842). Henrietta established a small boarding school, with two to eight pupils at a time. She also bore another son, Ryland, and a delicate daughter, Henrietta.

In 1842, the missionaries were allowed to move to Hong Kong, making Henrietta the first Western woman there. The Shucks were the first Baptist missionaries in Hong Kong. Rev. Shuck established the first Baptist church in the British colony (Queen's Road Baptist Chapel; now called Hong Kong Baptist Church), and two more soon followed. They converted Yong Seen Sarng, their language teacher. A year after their arrival, Henrietta set up a boarding school for about 15 pupils, both boys and girls. This pioneered education for Chinese girls. By 1844, the expanded school had 32 boarders, and the Shucks also brought many orphans into their home. Henrietta became seriously ill after the birth of their fourth child, but recovered.

== Death and legacy ==
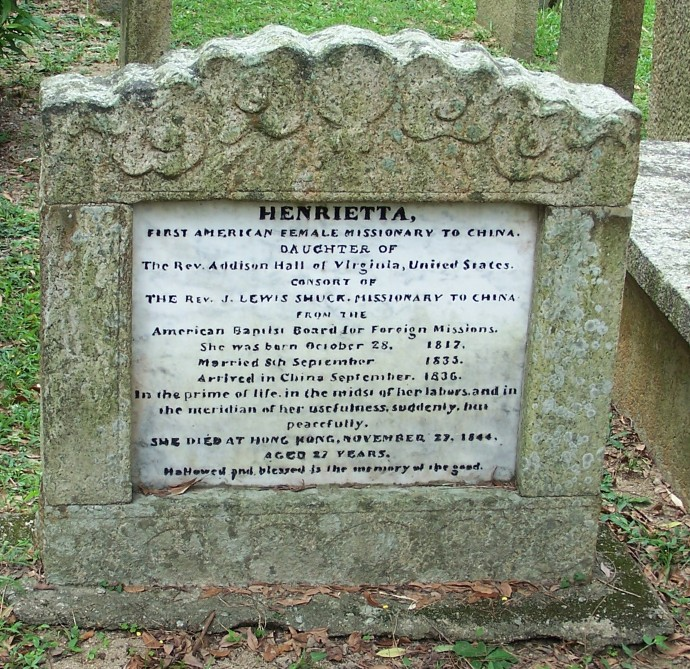
The grave of Henrietta Hall Shuck

On November 26, 1844, following the birth of their fifth child, Henrietta Shuck was suddenly taken ill and died at age 27. She was buried in Hong Kong Cemetery. Many of her letters were soon published and republished as missionary literature, Travels in China and Memoirs.

In 1845, Rev. Shuck returned to the United States to search for another wife, as well as raise funds for a chapel in Canton. Their sons Ryland Shuck (1837–1912) and Lewis Hall Shuck (1836–1911) also returned to be raised by their grandfather in Lancaster County, Virginia. Rev. Shuck also brought Yong Seen Sarng, with whom he toured the United States, speaking to various Baptist mission groups, including the newly formed Southern Baptist Convention. Sarng became a sensation in Richmond. The First Baptist Church of Richmond paid for his return journey, and sent him with warm clothing and a year's salary; they corresponded for many years. Rev. Lewis Shuck remarried, to Elizabeth Sexton, who died in China in 1851. Rev. Shuck established a Baptist Mission in Shanghai, and later worked among Chinese immigrants in California, establishing a Chinese-speaking Baptist church in San Francisco in 1855. He retired to Barnwell, South Carolina, where he died at age 49 and was buried in 1863.

By 1930, Henrietta Hall Shucks's home town of Kilmarnock prospered enough to incorporate. Baptist promotional literature called Henrietta "Virginia's Fairest Flower"; her fame was second only to Lottie Moon. Virginia's Baptists celebrated the Shuck Centennial in 1935 with a memorial service, commemorative marker at her birthplace and pageants in Norfolk, Bluefield, Newport News, Lynchburg and Danville. They also sponsored a biography, endowed two scholarships at the University of Shanghai, sent Dr. George W. Truett (President of the World Baptist Alliance) on a missionary tour of Southern Baptist mission stations in China and brought Mrs. F.Y.O. Ling (secretary of the All-China Women's Missionary Union) to the United States for a tour, sponsored two missionaries and a day school in China, as well as built a Henrietta Shuck Memorial Chapel in Shiu Hing Field. Her former house, however, was torn down in 1957 to make way for an auto-repair business. The name of Henrietta Secondary School in Hong Kong commemorates Mrs. Henrietta Hall Shuck.

== See also ==
- Henrietta Secondary School, a secondary school in Hong Kong named after Henrietta Hall Shuck.

== Further resources ==
- Jeter, Jeremiah Bell (1850). A Memoir of Mrs. Henrietta Shuck: The First American Female Missionary to China. Boston: Gould, Kendalin and Lincoln.
