= Plant Memorial =

Obelisk in China

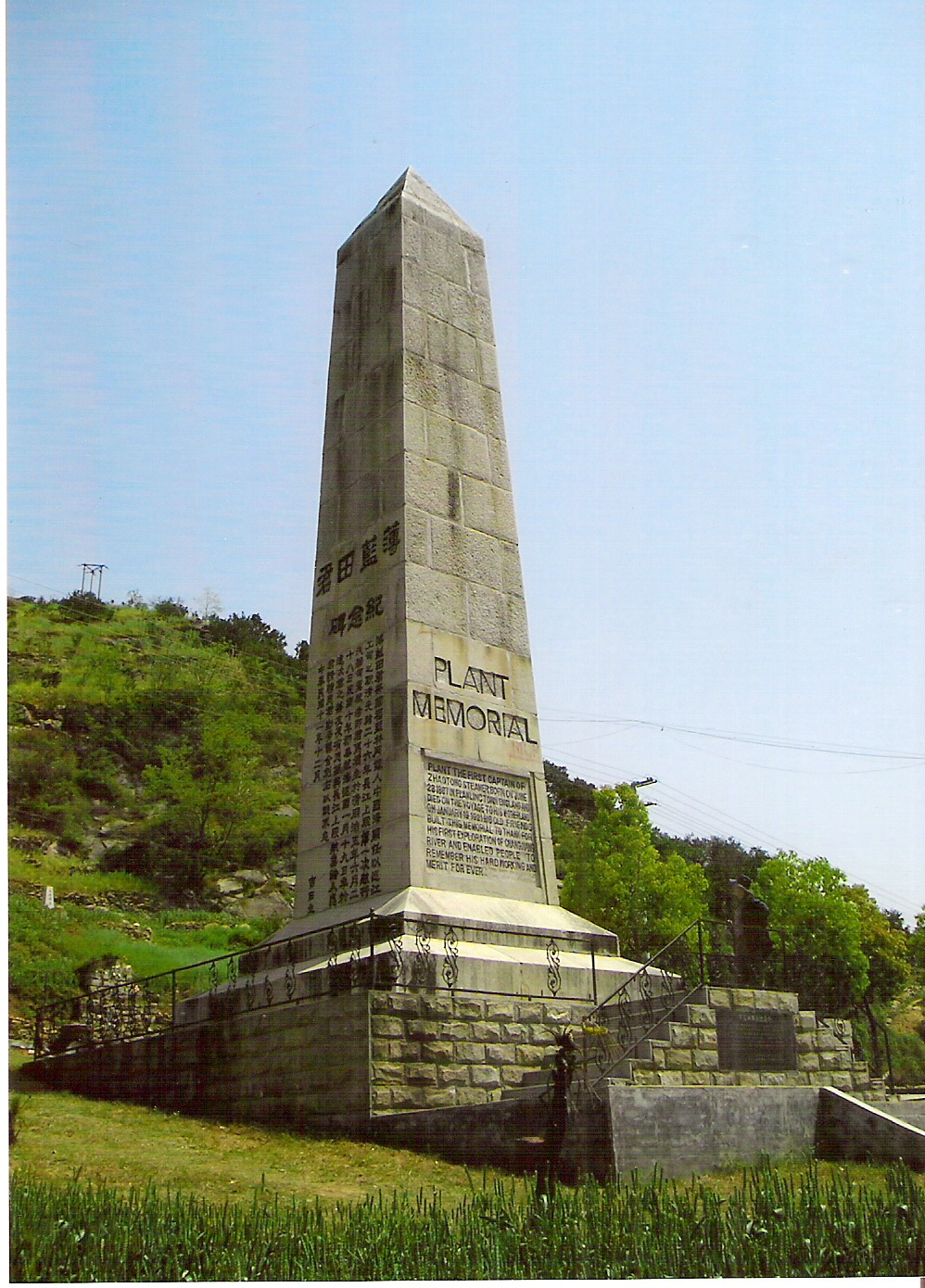
- Plant Memorial in 2005
- Location: Qu-Yuan Township, China
- Designer: Lawrence Tweedie-Stodart
- Type: Obelisk
- Material: Granite
- Completion date: 1923
- Dedicated to: Samuel Cornell Plant

The Plant Memorial, a 50-foot granite obelisk, was erected in 1923 at the Yangtze Three Gorges to perpetuate the name of Samuel Cornell Plant. He was the first Upper Yangtze River Inspector of Chinese Maritime Customs Service, the first to command a merchant steamer plying on the Upper Yangtze River (1900), and the first to command regular Upper Yangtze commercial steamship service for the Chinese firm, Sichuan Steam Navigation Company. The monument was originally located at Big Temple Hill in Xintan (now called Qu-Yuan Township). Because it was located within a flooding area related to the Three Gorges Dam Project and considered an important historical landmark for Three Gorges shipping history, the monument was moved to higher ground and restored between June 28, 2002 and January 18, 2003. This project was funded by Zigui County Office of Immigration and managed by Qu-Yuan Township Government.

== Plant deaths ==
Captain Plant, his wife, Alice, and their two adopted Chinese daughters, boarded SS Teiresias in Shanghai for travel to England on February 23, 1921. After only three days at sea, Captain Plant, who had been ailing, died in his cabin from pneumonia, despite ship doctor's efforts to treat his condition. Alice, who was struggling too, died three days later, from heart failure when the ship arrived at its first stop in Hong Kong. Both Plants were interred at the Hong Kong Cemetery in Happy Valley. Rt. Rev. William Banister conducted the graveside service. The Plants' two adopted Chinese daughters were among the chief mourners.

== Plant Memorial Fund ==
In a letter to the North-China Herald, dated two weeks after the Plants’ deaths, British Consul John Langford Smith of Yichang proposed the creation of a Memorial Fund to Captain Plant. He outlined three goals: 1) to build a monument to perpetuate Plant's memory and service, 2) to install a drinking fountain for trackers and 3), to provide for the Plants’ two Chinese daughters. On March 6, 1922, a pamphlet was printed and issued in English and Chinese outlining the Plant Memorial Fund objectives and the formation of a Plant Memorial Committee, with representatives from Great Britain, America, China, Japan and France. Donations were collected from individuals, ship crews, and shipping firms. Though the Fund was successful in constructing the memorial and providing for Plant's adopted Chinese daughters, there is no evidence the Fund met its objective of installing a drinking fountain.

== Monument inscription ==
On October 4, 1923, the Plant monument, designed by Lawrence Tweedie-Stodart, was erected in Xintan at the site of Captain Plant's former bungalow. The obelisk was inscribed both in English and in Chinese. Two of the four sides of the monument faced the Yangtze River diagonally. The English wording faced East because Captain Plant came from the sea and could be seen traveling upriver from the coast. The Chinese wording faced West because the Chinese came from the interior and could be seen traveling downriver Sichuan. The original English inscription read:

PLANT MEMORIAL

TO PERPETUATE THE NAME OF

CAPTAIN SAMUEL CORNELL PLANT

UPPER YANGTZE RIVER INSPECTOR

OF THE CHINESE MARITIME CUSTOMS

AND THE FIRST TO COMMAND A

MERCHANT STEAMER PLYING ON THE

…UPPER YANGTZE RIVER (1900)…

BORN AT FRAMLINGHAM, SUFFOLK, 8TH AUGUST 1866.

DIED AT SEA 26TH FEBRUARY 1921

ERECTED BY HIS FRIENDS AND THOSE INTERESTED IN

THE IMPROVEMENT OF STEAMER NAVIGATION

ON THE UPPER YANGTZE

The original Chinese inscription read:

薄藍田君紀念碑

薄藍田君，英國福藍臨岡鎮人，中國海關任以巡江工司之職。 清光緒二十六年，長江上段第一次航行汽船司駕駛者即君焉。 君生於清同治五年六月二十八日，民國十年初春航海返國，一月十九日卒於途次。 君之舊友及有誌振興長江上段航業諸人，感君情愫，思君勤勞，醵金刻石，以誌不忘。

中華民國十一年十二月吉日立。

== Monument history ==
The Monument was formally inaugurated on December 4, 1924.

Post-1949, the Plant Memorial was vandalized. There is some debate about the origins of the Plant Memorial defacement. Some say the National Red Guards in the 1960s came in an act of xenophobia to tear down what they considered to be an honor to a foreigner. The solid granite obelisk proved difficult to raze entirely and the Red Guard expressed their sentiments by chiseling out every character and letter in the inscriptions. Others have reported the defacement came during the Land Reform Movement in the 1950s. In either case, Xintan, a Chinese community of river pilots and junk owners, had been protective of the memorial and of Plant's contributions to them and the Yangtze. During his retirement, Plant lived among the residents of Xintan, outside of the treaty ports and away from the foreign settlements and his fellow expatriates.

The local people of Xintan remained loyal to Plant and in 2002, before the monument would be fully submerged in water from the Three Gorges Dam, they moved the memorial, 114 blocks, weighing 171 tons, to higher ground. The Chinese restored the inscriptions, in Chinese and English, from memory of what had been written forty years earlier.
