= John Fryer (sinologist) =

English missionary and academic (1839–1928)

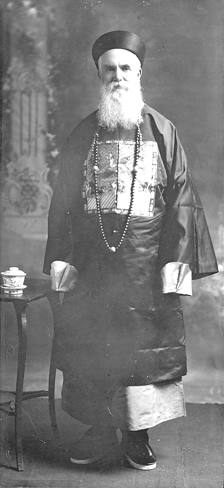
John Fryer

John Fryer (6 August 1839, Hythe, Kent, England - 1928), also known as Fu Lanya (Chinese: 傅蘭雅), was an English sinologist who was first Louis Agassiz Professor of Oriental Languages and Literature at the University of California, Berkeley. He was professor of English at Tung-Wen College (Chinese: 同文館; pinyin: Tongwenguan), Peking, China and head of the Anglo-Chinese School (Chinese: 英華書館; pinyin: Ying hua shuguan) in Shanghai, China, and established the Shanghai Polytechnic (Chinese: 格致學院; pinyin: Gezhi Shuyuan) and Institute for the Chinese Blind there. He was president of the Oriental Institute of California, United States.

== Early life ==
Fryer was born in Hythe, Kent, England, in 1839, the oldest child of the Rev. John Fryer, a dissident itinerant Methodist preacher, and Mary Wiles Fryer, a sometime school mistress and shop proprietor. His schooling was obtained at Prospect House Academy in Hythe, where his family's difficult circumstances had him working at the local brewery, cleaning boots and knives and running errands. He later attended St James School, Bristol, which he later described as being "attended by only the lowest of the low", matriculating in 1860. He spent the next year at Highbury Training College, London, where he obtained his teaching certificate.

In childhood, Fryer developed a deep interest in things Chinese, spurred on by his parents' own preoccupation. He was particularly impressed when a Chinese tea merchant from Canton visited and gave him a silver dollar.

== China ==
In 1861, Fryer accepted an opportunity offered by the Church Missionary Society to superintend St Paul's College, in Hong Kong, arriving there on board the Prince Alfred in July that year.

In 1863, Fryer left for Peking where he joined the Interpreters' College (Chinese: 同文館; pinyin: Tongwenguan). He married Anna Roleston there in 1865, followed the same year by his establishing the Anglo-Chinese School in Shanghai.

He was married in 1864 to Anna Rolestone, and in 1882, Eliza Nelson, an educator and missionary, who was also working in China.

Fryer was editor of the Shanghai Xinbao (Shanghai Gazette) from 1866 to 1868, the first Chinese newspaper published in the city.

Notwithstanding considering himself but "half-educated", Fryer had set his sights on grandeur, writing, in 1870,

I want to be named among those who are foremost in enlightening and administering the Great Empire.

Fryer made his most significant impact by translating more than 75 Western scientific works while working as Editor and Chief Translator of Scientific Books in the Department for the Translation of Foreign Books at the key armaments works and educational establishment, the Kiangnan Arsenal (Chinese: 江南製造局; pinyin: Jiangnan zhizaoju) in Shanghai for 28 years from May 1868. He collaborated closely in his work with natural scientist and district magistrate Xu Jianyin, as well as mathematicians Li Shanlan and Hua Hengfang. He had a long partnership with natural scientist Xu Shou (Chinese: 徐壽), particularly in the work of the Arsenal and the polytechnic Fryer was soon to establish.

Fryer established the Shanghai Polytechnic Institution and Reading Rooms in 1876. The other members of its first management committee were Walter Medhurst and Alexander Wylie. After difficult beginnings, the institution thrived until 1904 when its last science classes were held, then to be replaced by the Shanghai Science Middle School on the site in 1917. In 1895, Fryer could be found at the Institute giving lectures and conducting examinations with the aid of his son John Rogers Fryer (who was to die the following year).

Fryer published the widely read Gezhi Huibian (the Chinese Scientific Magazine, later the Chinese Scientific and Industrial Magazine) from 1876 to 1892.

The industrious Fryer also found time to establish the Gezhi Shushi (Chinese Scientific Book Depot) in 1884, a company publishing and selling scientific books in Shanghai. The Depot was a great success, selling about 150,000 volumes in its first three years. He relinquished ownership in 1911, the year he founded the Institute for the Chinese Blind.

== California ==
In 1896, Fryer left the Arsenal to become the University of California's first Professor of Oriental Language and Literature, at Berkeley, where, in 1900, the department introduced courses in elementary Cantonese, Japanese and Kuan-hua (Mandarin) conducted by Walter Fong, Yoshisaburo Kuno and himself, respectively. He had a distinguished teaching career up to his retirement in 1913. He was considered a pioneer of Chinese studies in the United States.

== Legacy ==
Through his extensive translation output while working at the Kiangnan Arsenal, Fryer is considered to have had a profound influence on the standardization of scientific translation in 19th century China and promoting the understanding of Western science in China. His The Translator's Vade-mecum set out his lexicological solutions to translation of technical and scientific terminology into Chinese and marked him a pioneer in the field.

The John Fryer Trophy for Chinese History is conferred by St. Paul's College, Hong Kong, for academic excellence.
