= Henrietta Secondary School =

Coordinates: 22.29158°N 114.19438°E

- 顯理中學
- 2 City Garden, North Point, Hong Kong

Information
- Type: Aided Secondary School
- Motto: Faith, Love, Loyalty, Honesty
- Established: 1945
- Principal: Ma Yuen Fat
- Faculty: 64
- Enrollment: 30 classes, 1000 students
- Affiliation: Hong Kong Baptist Church
- Website: http://henrietta.edu.hk/

Henrietta Secondary School
- Traditional Chinese: 顯理中學
- Simplified Chinese: 显理中学
Transcriptions
Standard Mandarin
- Hanyu Pinyin: Xiǎn Lǐ Zhōngxué
Yue: Cantonese
- Jyutping: hin2 lei5 zung1 hok6

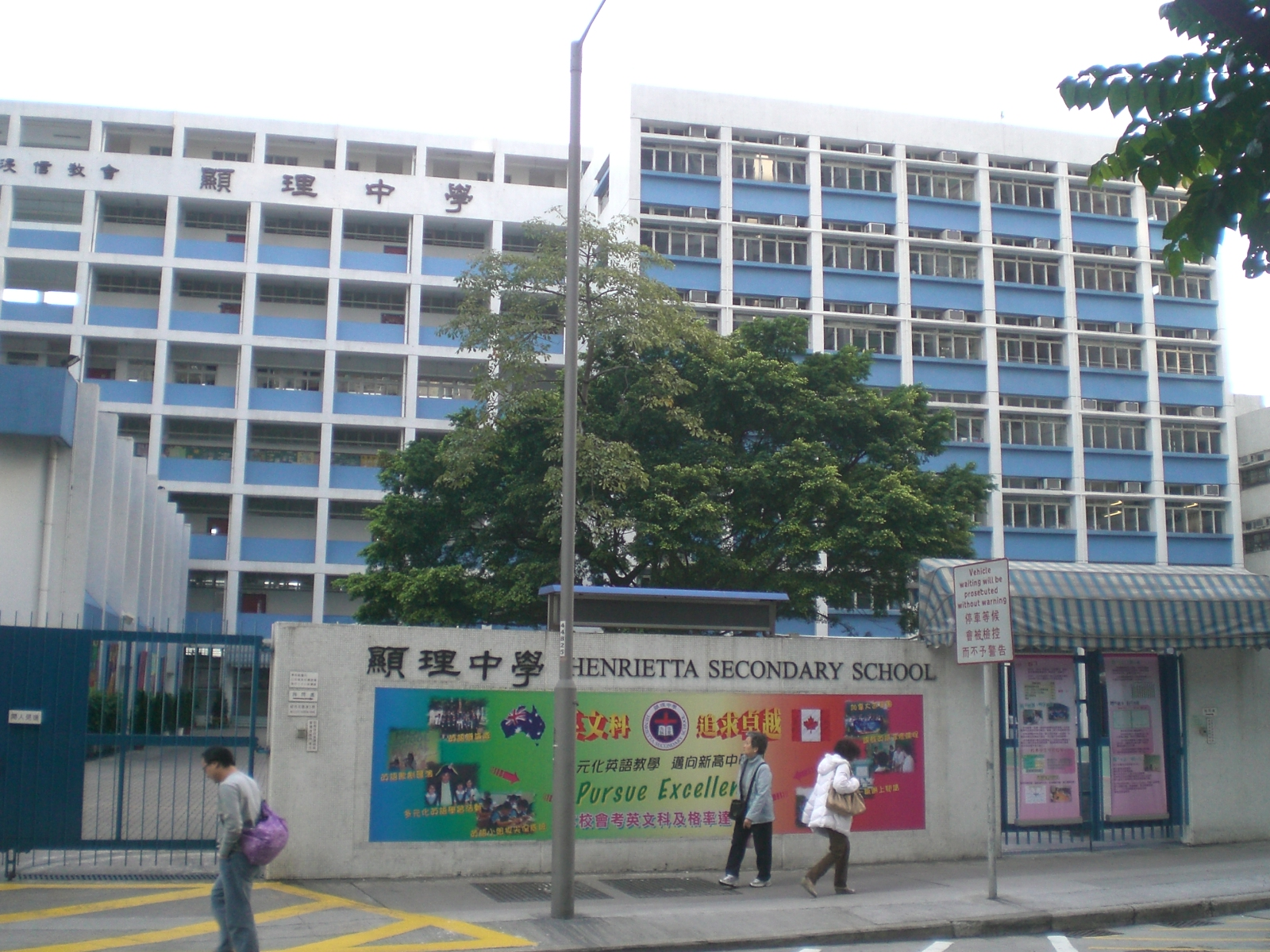
Henrietta Secondary School

Henrietta Secondary School (Chinese: 顯理中學) is a secondary school in Hong Kong. The school celebrated its 70th anniversary in October 2015. The current principal is Ma Yuen Fat and the school's supervisor is Rev. Lau Siu Hong.

== History ==
The school was founded as Henrietta School in 1924 and was known by that name until 1941 when was closed down due to the Japanese occupation of Hong Kong. The name of the school commemorates the first American female missionary, Henrietta Hall Shuck, to China. The secondary school campus was on Park Road for decades till 1995. It was then moved to the Eastern District on Hong Kong Island.

== Location ==
The school is currently located at 2 City Garden Road, North Point, Hong Kong. It is the only secondary school in Hong Kong located next to Victoria Harbour.
