= Springville-Griffith Institute =

Location
- 290 North Buffalo St; Springville, (Erie County), New York 14141; United States
- Coordinates: 42.5158°N 78.6663°W

Information
- School type: Public school (government funded), high school
- School district: Springville-Griffith Institute Central School District
- NCES District ID: 3612990
- Superintendent: James Bialasik
- CEEB code: 335315
- NCES School ID: 361299001064
- Principal: Meghan Janora
- Faculty: 43.82 (FTE)
- Grades: 9–12; Ungraded
- Gender: Coeducational
- Enrollment: 558 (2018-19)
- Student to teacher ratio: 12.73
- Campus: Town: Fringe
- Colors: Purple and Gold
- Mascot: Griffin
- Yearbook: The Griffonell

Springville-Griffith Institute is a public high school located in Springville, Erie County, New York, U.S.A., and is the only high school operated by the Springville-Griffith Institute Central School District, which was originally established in 1830.

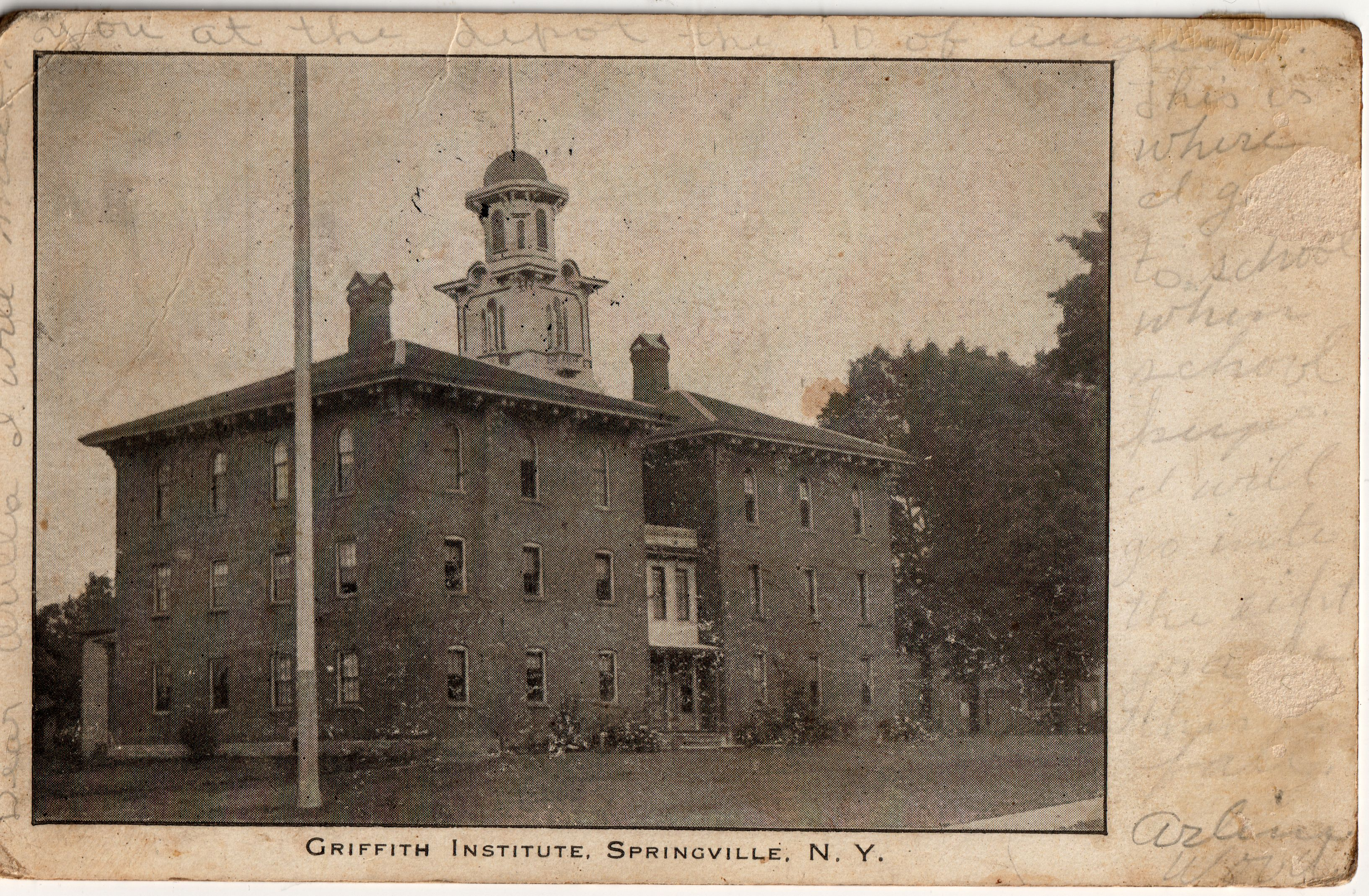
Griffith Institute, Springville NY, 1907

== Notable alumni ==
- Eliza Nelson Fryer (1847-1910), educator and missionary
- Pop Warner (1871-1954), college football coach
