= Walter Fong =

American educator, missionary and linguist (1866–1906)

- Born: April 1, 1866
- Died: May 19, 1906 (aged 40)

Academic background
- Education: Stanford University; University of the Pacific

Academic work
- Institutions: University of California, Berkeley

Walter Ngon Fong (Chinese: 鄺華汰) (1 April 1866, Guangdong, China - 12 May 1906, Hong Kong) was an American educator, missionary and linguist who founded the first technical college in Hong Kong. He was Stanford University's first Chinese graduate.

== Early life ==
Fong was born on 1 April 1866 to a humble farming family in the village of Sunning, Guangdong, China. At 15, he emigrated to California, United States, where he initially attended a Presbyterian Mission. While later working at the Chinese Methodist School in San Jose, he pursued further studies at the University of the Pacific from which he graduated in 1892. He went on to be the first Chinese student to graduate from Stanford University, in 1896, majoring in Economics and Social Studies.

After a year working as an agent for a building and loan association and a San Francisco law firm, Fong married fellow Stanford student Emma Howse in 1897, travelling to Denver, Colorado, to register the marriage, it being the only state where mixed marriages were legal at the time. Having decided business was not for him, he completed another three years' science studies at the University of California, Berkeley, obtaining is master's degree, all the while acting as pastor of the Oakland Chinese M. E. Mission at this time.

== Educator, return to China ==
In 1900, Fong's first academic posting was as an instructor in John Fryer's School of Oriental Languages and Literature at the University of California, Berkeley, where he taught a course in elementary Cantonese.

In 1902, his Introductory Notes on the Cantonese Language was published.

The next year, he was recruited by tycoon Li Sing to move to Hong Kong to establish its first technical college, the Li Shing Scientific and Industrial College. The college opened its doors in 1904 to an enrollment of 70. His article published in the August 1905 edition of Popular Science Monthly bemoaning the poor state of education in China yet highlighting the vast potential garnered considerable interest.

Having established a reputation as a key educator in the push to modernise Chinese education, Fong was one of the casualties of the plague that ravaged Hong Kong in 1906. He died on 12 May of that year, and was buried in Hong Kong Cemetery.
