= Samuel Cornell Plant =

British sailor (1866–1921)

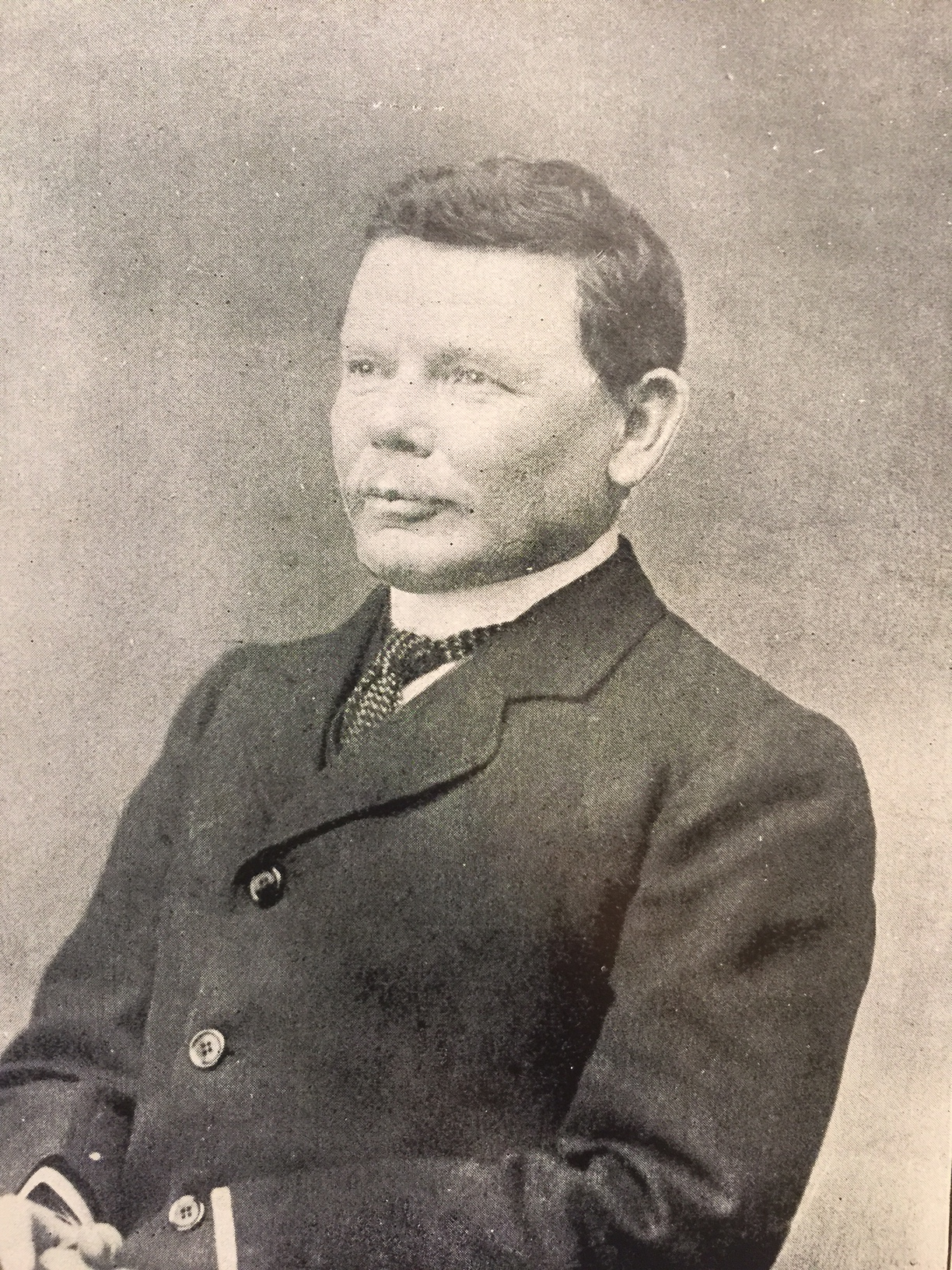
- Born: 8 August 1866; Framlingham, Suffolk, England
- Died: 26 February 1921 (aged 54); At sea en route from Shanghai to Hong Kong
- Resting place: Hong Kong Cemetery
- Monuments: Plant Memorial
- Other name: Pu Lan Tian
- Occupation: First Senior Upper Yangtze River Inspector
- Years active: 7 years
- Employer: Chinese Maritime Customs Service
- Spouse: Alice Sophia Peters
- Awards: Class 5 and Class 6 Chia-Ho Medals

Samuel Cornell Plant (8 August 1866 – 26 February 1921) was a British sailor who is best known as the first to command a merchant steamer plying on the Upper Yangtze River in 1900. The Upper Yangtze is the section of river stretching through gorges from Yichang to Chongqing. Plant later collaborated with Chinese merchants and the government to create Sichuan Steam Navigation Company, serving as Captain of SS Shutung and SS Shuhun, providing the first regular merchant steam service on the Upper Yangtze. He is further recognized for his contributions as Chinese Maritime Customs’ First Senior River Inspector on the Upper Yangtze. Plant installed the river's navigational marks, established signaling systems, wrote a manual for shipmasters, and trained hundreds of foreign and Chinese pilots.

In China he was known as Pu Lan Tian.

== Early life ==
Plant was born in Framlingham, located in Suffolk, England, the third out of four children. His father, Samuel Plant, a Captain in the Mercantile Marine, commanded Reigate, for trade with India. In 1881, young "Cornell" aged fourteen, joined his father for what was to be their first and last voyage together. Captain Sam suffered a heart attack on the journey and fell from his companion ladder, dying shortly after. Young Cornell buried his father upon arrival to India in Madras and continued after his father at sea. He first worked on Iron Ship Reigate as an ordinary seaman for two years, then a year as an Able Seaman for Pacific Steam Navigation Company's Australian Service. Plant returned to Reigate as Third Mate and in 1886 obtained his Second Mate's certificate.

== Persia ==
Plant transitioned to river exploration in the late 1880s. The Shah of Persia granted England limited permission to initiate commercial trade on the Lower Karun. Plant joined this effort on Messrs. Lynch Brothers' Euphrates & Tigris Steam Navigation Co.’s Khalifa. At age 25, when access to Upper Karun was authorized, Plant was offered command of his first vessel, Shushan. Plant explored the three upper rivers and established trade routes. In 1896 he submitted a map to the British India Intelligence Office and returned to England.

== China ==
First Merchant Steamship on Upper Yangtze

Archibald John Little selected Plant in 1898 to join him in China to solve the challenge of steamship navigation on the Upper Yangtze, connecting Yichang and Chongqing. Plant provided design input for Little’s venture, SS Pioneer, and took command of the commercial steamship. In 1900, he became the first to pilot a merchant steamship unaided through that stretch. The outbreak of the Boxer Rebellion put an end to its future commercial passages and the British Navy acquired the vessel for military use, renaming it HMS Kinsha. The Boxer Rebellion, combined with the sinking of the German’s steamer, SS Suixing, on her maiden voyage in the same year and extensive railroad ambitions, delayed mercantile steam efforts for another nine years.

French Navy

With Pioneer in British military hands as HMS Kinsha, and his services declined by the Royal Navy, Plant offered navigational expertise to the French Navy. Emile Auguste Léon Hourst hired Plant on Olry for exploration from Chongqing to Suifu. Plant contracted his services to the French from 1901 -1909. When the river was low, Plant operated an Upper Yangtze Chinese native craft, guazǐchuan, "Junie" with his wife and Chinese crew. He bought property on the hills opposite Chongqing in 1905 in the same expatriate community as Little and other foreign merchants and customs officials.

Sichuan Steam Navigation Company

Efforts to connect wealthy Sichuan to the rest of China returned to the question of steamship viability. In 1908, the Chinese partnered with Plant, who combined Upper Yangtze navigational knowledge with a thorough understanding of steamship performance and design. Merchants and officials of Chongqing and Chengdu formed the Sichuan Steam Navigation Company with capital from Chinese official sources and private Chinese merchants. SS Shutung, the company's first ship on the Upper Yangtze run, could travel upriver in five to seven days. The service was such a financial success that a second vessel of twice the carrying capacity, SS Shuhun was introduced in 1914.

Chinese Maritime Customs Service

Chinese Maritime Customs Service offered Plant a position in 1915 as First Senior River Inspector for the Upper Yangtze with an office in Chongqing. This role enabled Plant's vast knowledge and expertise to be extended to recipients of all nationalities. He trained pilots - both foreign and Chinese, issued licenses, developed a manual, installed navigational marks, inspected ships and established signaling systems to ensure successful passages. Captain Plant was awarded two Chia-Ho Medals by the Chinese Government. In 1917 he received a Class 6 Chia-Ho Medal and in 1921, he was awarded a Class 5 Chia-Ho Medal.

== Personal life ==
Plant married Alice Sophia Peters in Bushire, Persia in April 1894. She was his constant companion. Alice accompanied Plant on his first trip up the Upper Yangtze aboard Pioneer and joined him on the Olry. She also traveled with him on the Chinese native craft, Junie, and on Shutung and Shuhun. In 1919, the Plants sold their home in Chongqing's foreign community and moved to Xintan, an exclusively Chinese village, home to many Chinese junk owners and pilots. They did not have any biological children but did adopt two Chinese daughters. These Chinese girls were identified as Isobel and Clara Qian, orphaned biological daughters of Sichuan's Commissioner of Foreign Affairs, Qian Weishan, and his English wife, Adela Robina Warburton, whom he met while studying in London.

== Death ==
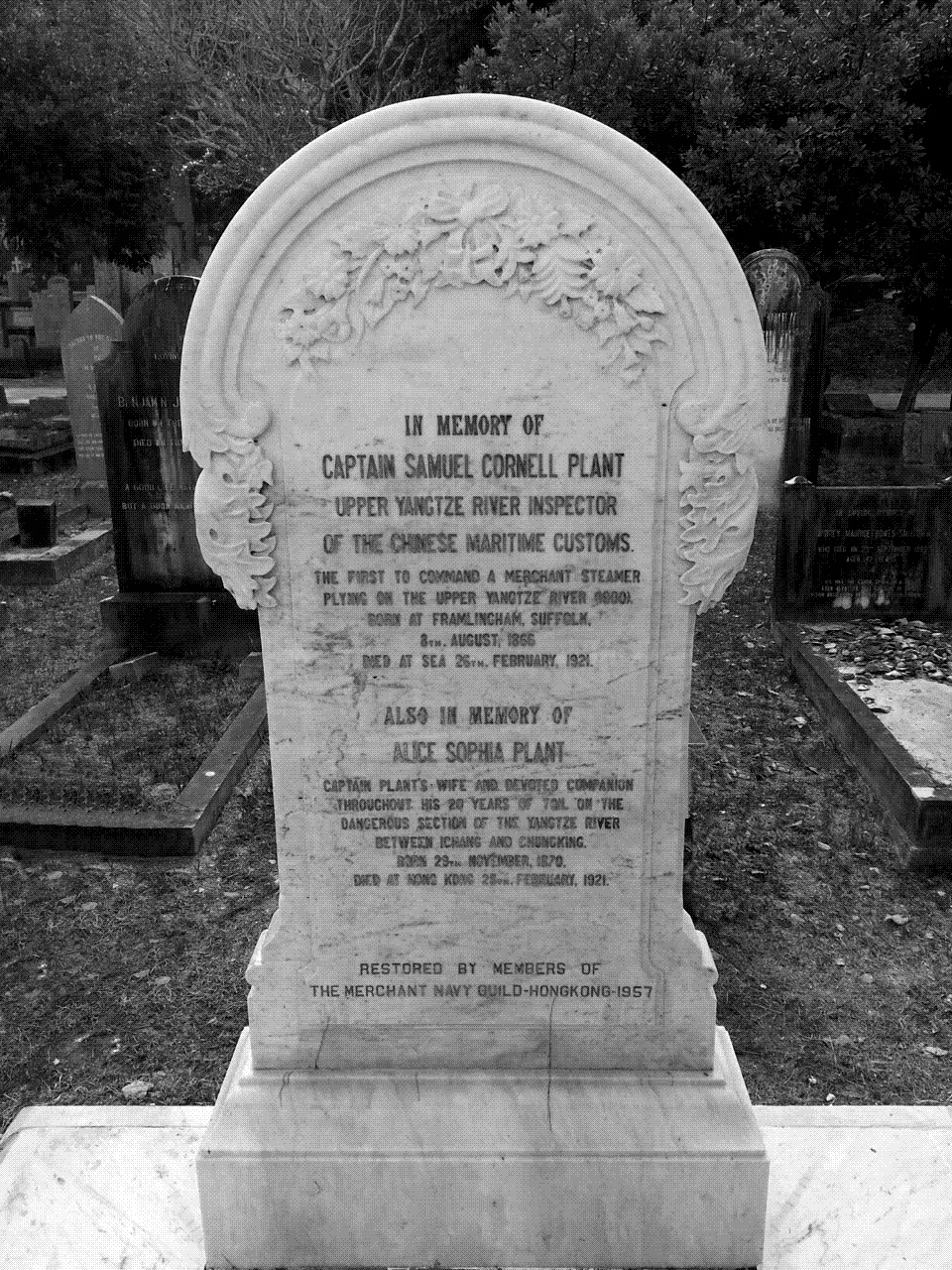
Plant Headstone in Hong Kong Cemetery.

On 23 February 1921, Captain Plant, his wife, Alice, and their two adopted Chinese daughters, boarded SS Teiresias in Shanghai to return to England.

Plant caught pneumonia on the boat and died at sea; his wife died a month later.

Both Captain and Mrs. Plant were buried in Hong Kong Cemetery in Happy Valley. Their adopted daughters were returned to China by shipping agent Butterfield & Swire and placed under legal guardianship of New Zealand missionary, Mary Emelia Moore at the Church of Scotland Mission in Yichang. The death date of Alice Plant is incorrectly reflected on the Happy Valley headstone as 28 February 1921.

== Plant Memorial ==
Yichang's British Consul, John Langford Smith, proposed the creation of a Plant Monument Fund to honor Plant's contributions to Upper Yangtze trade. As the Fund's President, Smith printed Chinese and English subscription documents proposing a 50-foot granite obelisk engraved on one side in Chinese characters and the other in English, to be seen by all those who pass up and down the Yangtze Gorges. Donations from Chinese and Western friends of Captain Plant were collected and a portion was allocated to support and educate Plant's adopted daughters. In 1924, a monument was erected in Xintan at the site of Captain Plant's home. In 2002, the Chinese government flagged the monument as important ahead of the Three Gorges Dam project and moved it to higher ground where it can be seen today.

The Plant Memorial was vandalised by the Red Guards in the 1968.

== Publications ==
- Handbook for the Guidance of Shipmasters on the Ichang-Chungking Section of the Yangtze River, S.C. Plant, Published by Order of the Inspector General of Customs – Chinese Maritime Customs, Shanghai, 1920.
- Glimpses of the Yangtze Gorges, by Cornell Plant, with illustrations by Ivon A. Donnelly, Kelly & Walsh Limited, Shanghai, 1921 and 1926.
- Simon Winchester (1998). The River at the Centre of the World: A Journey up the Yangtze, and Back in Chinese Time. Penguin.
