= Eliza Nelson Fryer =

American educator, missionary

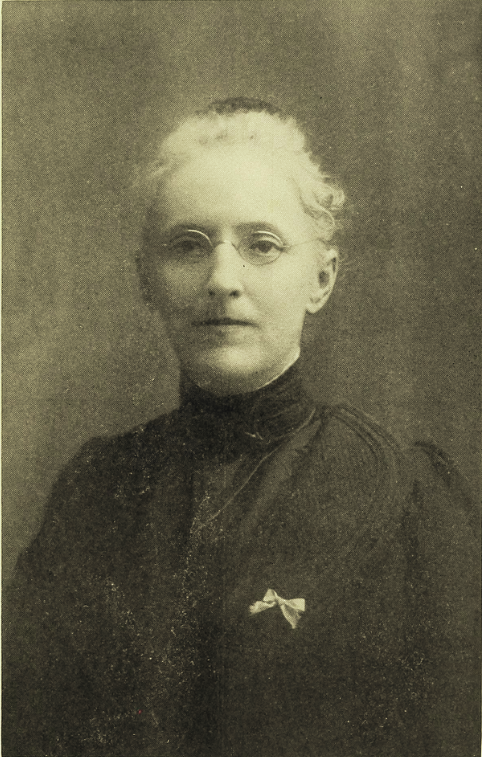
Eliza Nelson Fryer

Eliza Nelson Fryer (April 22, 1847 – May 10, 1910) was an American educator and missionary. Her Bible was her constant companion both at home and wherever she traveled. She was committed to the cause of the Woman's Christian Temperance Union (WCTU). Her unusual skill in painting in oils and in watercolors was well known. In addition writing numerous articles and papers, she edited books.

== Early life and education ==
Anna Eliza Nelson was born at Sardinia, New York, on April 22, 1847. Her father, Wilbur Nelson, was a man of literary ability, especially in theological and political subjects. He died at an early age during an epidemic of dysentery, leaving his young wife and two small children. The property which he left, which might have helped Eliza, was so invested as to be unavailable.

Mrs. Nelson afterwards married a well-to-do farmer, Mr. C. Crumb, of East Otto, New York.

Early in her life, she felt compelled to gain a good education, and her struggle to satisfy this longing was a part of the story of her life. She dealt with objections from those who did not believe in the higher education of women. At the age of 16, she determined to support herself by teaching, and by that means, go on with her own studies, first at Griffith Institute at Springville, New York, and afterwards at Alfred University, from which she graduated. Later, she obtained the degree of Master of Arts. Friends who knew her at this time recall her physical frailty, self-denial, cheerfulness, and excellent scholarship.

== Career ==
For some time after her graduation from Alfred University, Fryer was an invalid. After recovering her health to some extent, she returned to Alfred where she was appointed to a professorship. The school president and his wife treated Fryer as a daughter.

In 1879, she received a call from the Seventh Day Baptist Mission Board to go to China as a teacher as a reinforcement of the China mission. With Rev. D. H. Davis and his wife, she sailed from San Francisco in the steamer City of Tokio, December 27, and arrived at Yokohama on January 18, 1880. They sailed January 21, 1880 for Shanghai, arriving there January 29. There they were met and welcomed by three or four other missionaries and two local residents. The missionaries settled in their homes, began the study of the language, and engaged in the work through interpreters.

She was successful in acquiring the language and gaining the affection of the Chinese people. She very soon, however, felt the effects of the malarial climate of Shanghai. In spite of the illness and consequent weakness, she undertook school work both inside the city and outside the West Gate. She also visited in the homes of the people.

Here, her successes in learning the Chinese language and being accepted by the Chinese people were extraordinary. In spite of severe illness and consequent weakness, she organized various schools, both at Shanghai and in the surrounding area. It was while engaged in this work that she became acquainted with Dr. John Fryer, of Shanghai, who had for many years been employed by the Chinese government in preparing an encyclopedia of scientific works in the Chinese language. They married at the Holy Trinity Church, Shanghai on the June 6, 1882. From that day, she was a devoted wife and also a kind mother to Dr. Fryer's four young children by his previous marriage. She raised and educated them in England, China, and California.

She continued her work for the Chinese after marriage. During her life at the Kiangnan Arsenal she availed herself of opportunities to meet and help many Chinese women of the higher class. Often she traveled the five miles to Shanghai in a ricksha to stay with the sick and more than once, she ordered provisions or clothing to be sent to the really needy. Fryer espoused every good cause that came her way. Her work in the WCTU, both in Shanghai and California, may be mentioned. For years she led the Band of Hope in Shanghai, taking a deep and abiding interest in the children.

Oakland, California was selected as the family home on account of its educational facilities. Subsequently, because of Dr. Fryer's duties as professor of the Department of Oriental Languages and Literatures at the University of California, Berkeley, the family removed to Berkeley, California and lived in the house they built on Durant Avenue. In Berkeley, she was a ready participant in the college community, often taking part particularly in the work of the YWCA.

The Fryer's home, whether at the Arsenal, or in Oakland, California, where she went with the children in 1892, or later in Berkeley, was always open to the Chinese and many Chinese students stayed with them. Their home, for years, was a resting place for missionaries, whom she always sought out and entertained.

Since living in California, Fryer returned to China on two occasions, the last time in 1908 when she accompanied her husband on a tour around the world, which also included India and Egypt. The many changes she found in China deeply interested her and she looked forward to doing further service for China through the addresses she was so frequently asked to give in different churches and before various missionary and other societies. She was particularly interested in Egypt and visited every locality of importance that a short journey up the Nile permitted. On returning to Berkeley, she read every book on Egypt that she could purchase.

Since August 1909, she resided with her husband at Cloyne Court Hotel in Berkeley.

== Death and legacy ==
A beautiful life

In 1910, she accidentally slipped when walking on a footpath in the rain and hurt herself considerably. The shock brought on heart troubles. After a fortnight, she was removed to the Nauheim Sanitarium in Oakland, where the Drs. Maxson treated her, having known and treated her for many years. At first, she seemed to rally, but early in the morning of May 10, 1910, she died of angina at Berkeley, California.

Her funeral, held at the first Congregational Church at Berkeley, was largely attended. She was buried in Oakland's Mountain View Cemetery.

Nellie Blessing Eyster and John Fryer published Mrs. Fryer's memoir, A beautiful life - memoir of Mrs. Eliza Nelson Fryer, 1847-1910, in 1912.
