= Wong Tape =

Merchant in NZ and Hong Kong (1875–1967)

Benjamin Wong Tape OBE JP (Chinese: 黃炳耀; 26 December 1875 – 16 June 1967) was a merchant in New Zealand and Hong Kong. Born to Chinese immigrants in Dunedin, he received his education at schools in Hong Kong and Dunedin. He became known in Otago and Southland as a trader, but also as a translator. He permanently moved to Hong Kong at the age of 30, and had a prominent role with many organisations there. He was a member of the Urban Council of Hong Kong on two occasions.

== Early life ==
He was born in Dunedin, New Zealand in 1875 after the arrival of his parents in the country. His father was Forsigh Wong Tape, a merchant from Sunning in the Taishan county, Guangdong province, China, and his mother was Hie Toy. His father was leading a group of Chinese diggers to Otago for prospecting gold. His parents were married by the minister of Knox Church, Donald Stuart, on 20 March 1875.

Due to his occupation as a trader, his father travelled frequently between New Zealand and Hong Kong, and Wong Tape often accompanied him. He received his education at Victoria College in Hong Kong and, after his father's death in 1891, at Otago Boys' High School. He lived in Hong Kong from 1894, where he married Emma Kwai-Chun (born 1874), but returned to Dunedin in 1898 without his wife.

Wong Tape joined the firm of Hip Fong Tie, importers of Chinese goods and lending agent. Whilst he was often absent due to travel in Southland and Otago, he became well known for his business connections and as an interpreter.

== Later life in Hong Kong ==
When he left Dunedin for good in 1905, he received testimonials from many of the leading people in Dunedin. He became general manager of an insurance company, a job that he held until his retirement in 1934. He came out of retirement in 1945 to open the firm's Hong Kong office.

Wong Tape was a founding member of the Hong Kong chapter of Rotary International, and of the University of Hong Kong. He was appointed onto the Urban Council in 1936 and again in 1949 (he retired in the following year). He was awarded an OBE in 1948.

His wife died on 30 June 1953, and Wong Tape died on 16 June 1967. He was survived by their two sons. They are interred at Hong Kong Cemetery in section 11B row 12 grave number 3, together with their son Eric. The Hocken Collections in Dunedin holds papers and documents of Wong Tape.
