= Joseph Henry Hughes =

Canadian politician (1857–1917)

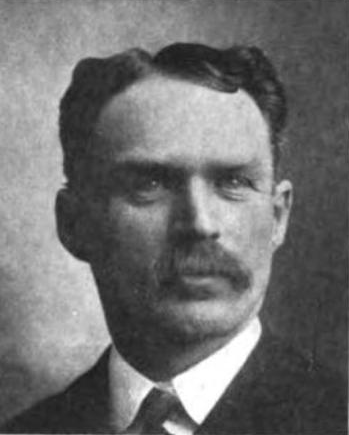

Mayor of Brandon, Manitoba
- In office 1914

Personal details
- Born: April 14, 1857 London, Canada West
- Died: August 5, 1917 (aged 60) Brandon, Manitoba
- Spouse: Anna Maria Hughes (m. 1883)
- Children: 5
- Occupation: Politician

Joseph Henry Hughes (April 14, 1857 – August 5, 1917) was a politician in Manitoba, Canada. He was the mayor of Brandon, Manitoba, in 1914.

== Biography ==
Born on April 14, 1857, at London, Canada West, a son of Joseph C. Hughes and Jane McAndless, brother of Anthony James Hughes and Thomas Alfred Martin Hughes. His father farmed in Middlesex County until 1903 then retired to Brandon. J. H. Hughes was educated at Middlesex County and the Toronto Normal School (1874). He taught school in 1875, then went into business as a general merchant at Iderton. He moved to Brandon in 1882, joining in partnership with T. H. Patrick of Souris in a lumber business, operating yards at Brandon and Souris. The partnership dissolved in 1886, and Hughes went on to establish mills at Rainy River, Ontario. He disposed of his mills in 1901 and established a wholesale and retail lumber business in Brandon on 10th Street, between Rosser and Princess Street. He also owned most of the property between 10th and 11th Streets, Rosser & Princess. He erected a brick block on 10th Street, as well as the Strathcona Block. He employed over 40 men to manufacture sash doors and builders' supplies.

In 1883, he married Anna Maria Hughes of Middlesex County (near Strathroy), daughter of Thomas Hughes of Metcalfe, Middlesex County. They had five children: Alma Hughes (born 1885), Maggie May Hughes (born 1887; attending Alma College, St. Thomas, Ontario, 1906), Percy Cooper Hughes (born 1889), Harley Moody Hughes (born 1892), and Ruth Alida Hughes (born 1894).

He died in Brandon on August 5, 1917.

Hughes is the great-grandfather of Aqua Books founder Kelly Hughes.

== Footnotes ==
This article incorporates text from A History of Manitoba: Its Resources and People, by Prof. George Bryce, a publication from 1906, now in the public domain in the United States.
