= Joe Hughes (quarterback) =

Profile
- Position: Quarterback

Personal information
- Born: c. 1972
- Listed height: 6 ft 3 in (1.91 m)
- Listed weight: 215 lb (98 kg)

Career information
- High school: Gridley (CA)
- College: Butte College (1990–1991): Wyoming (1992–1993)

Joe Hughes (born c. 1972) is a former American football quarterback. A native of Gridley, California, he began his college football career at Butte College in Oroville, California, passing for 24 touchdowns with only five interceptions in 1991. He then played college football for the Wyoming Cowboys in 1992 and 1993. He led the 1993 Wyoming team to an 8–3 regular-season record while setting single-season school records with 3,135 passing yards and 24 passing touchdowns. He also ranked among the leading quarterbacks in major-college football in 1992 with 2,706 passing yards (9th), 2,843 total yards (8th), and 16 passing interceptions (8th). In two years at Wyoming, he completed 424 of 744 passes (57.0%) for 5,841 yards, 38 touchdowns, 26 interceptions, and a 132.8 passer rating. In his final game for Wyoming, the 1993 Copper Bowl, he sustained an ankle injury that required surgery and resulted in his missing the NFL Scouting Combine.

== See also ==
- Wyoming Cowboys football statistical leaders
