= Hong Kong Cemetery =

Cemetery in Happy Valley, Hong Kong

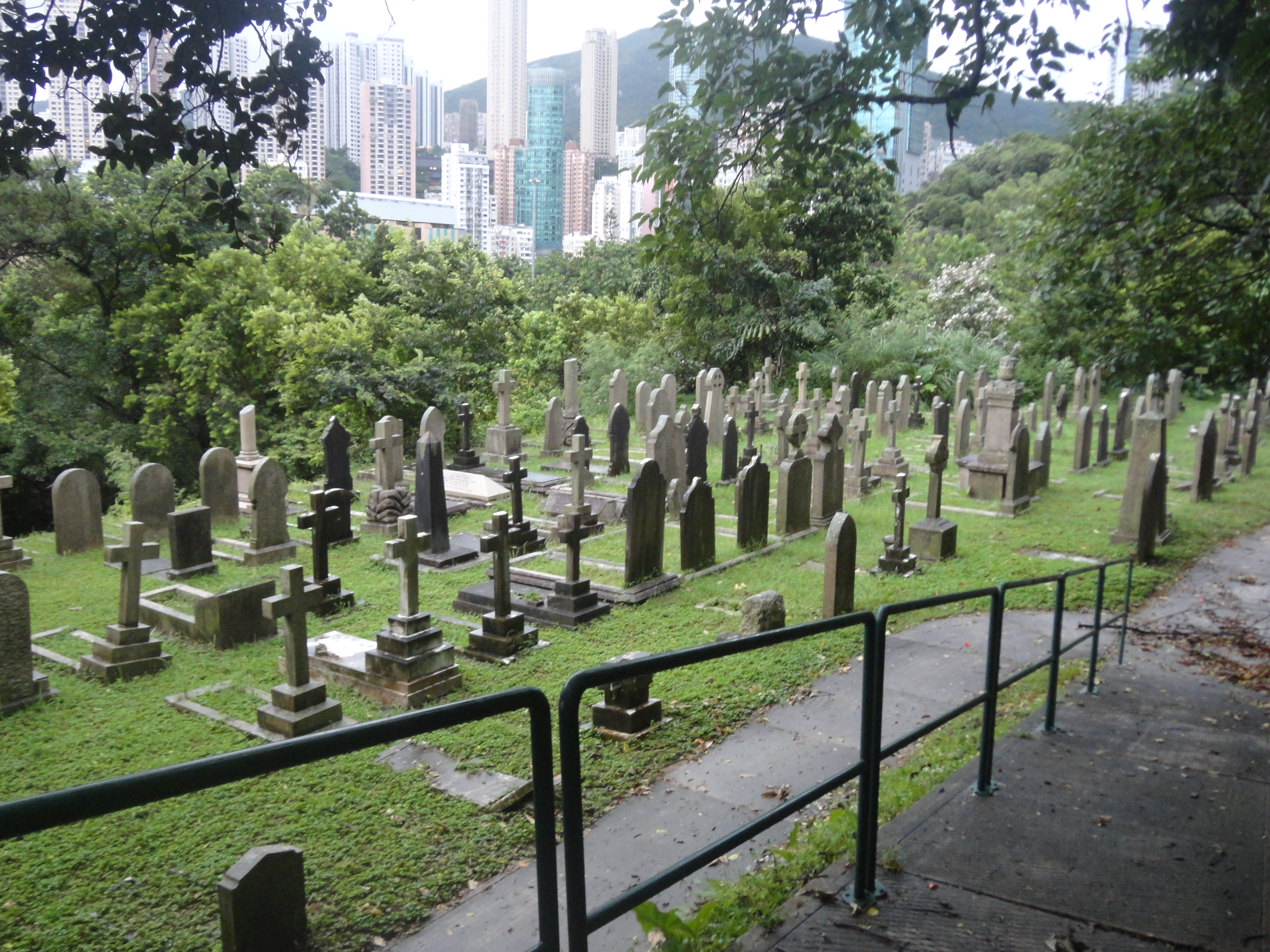
- Hong Kong Cemetery in Happy Valley
- Interactive map of Hong Kong Cemetery

Details
- Established: 1845; 181 years ago
- Location: 1J Wong Nai Chung Road, Happy Valley
- Country: Hong Kong
- Coordinates: 22.2702°N 114.1816°E
- Find a Grave: Hong Kong Cemetery

Hong Kong Cemetery
- Traditional Chinese: 香港墳場
Transcriptions
Yue: Cantonese
- Yale Romanization: Hēung góng fàhn chèuhng
- Jyutping: Hoeng^{1} gong^{2} fan^{4} coeng^{4}

Hong Kong Cemetery, formerly Hong Kong (Happy Valley) Cemetery and before that Hong Kong Colonial Cemetery, is one of the early Christian cemeteries in Hong Kong dating to its colonial era beginning in 1845. It is located beside the racecourse at Happy Valley, along with the Jewish Cemetery, Hindu Cemetery, Parsee Cemetery, St. Michael's Catholic Cemetery and the Muslim Cemetery.

Hong Kong Cemetery is a public cemetery managed by the Food and Environmental Hygiene Department. Hong Kong Cemetery contains 79 scattered Commonwealth burials of the First World War and 62 from the Second World War, which are maintained by the Commonwealth War Graves Commission.

The Protestant Cemetery is built as a series of terraces ascending a hillside. The older graves tend to be at the bottom of the hill; those from the 1930s and 1940s are generally at the top.

On a number of occasions, remains in the Protestant Cemetery have been disinterred to make way for road developments, and have been placed in niches in an ossuary, which continues to be used for contemporary cremations. The niches provide basic information on each individual.

== Types of graves ==
Some sections of the Protestant Cemetery tended to be reserved for particular groups of deceased, e.g., army, navy, Hong Kong Police. There are two main categories of graves that can be found in Hong Kong Cemetery:

=== Military graves ===
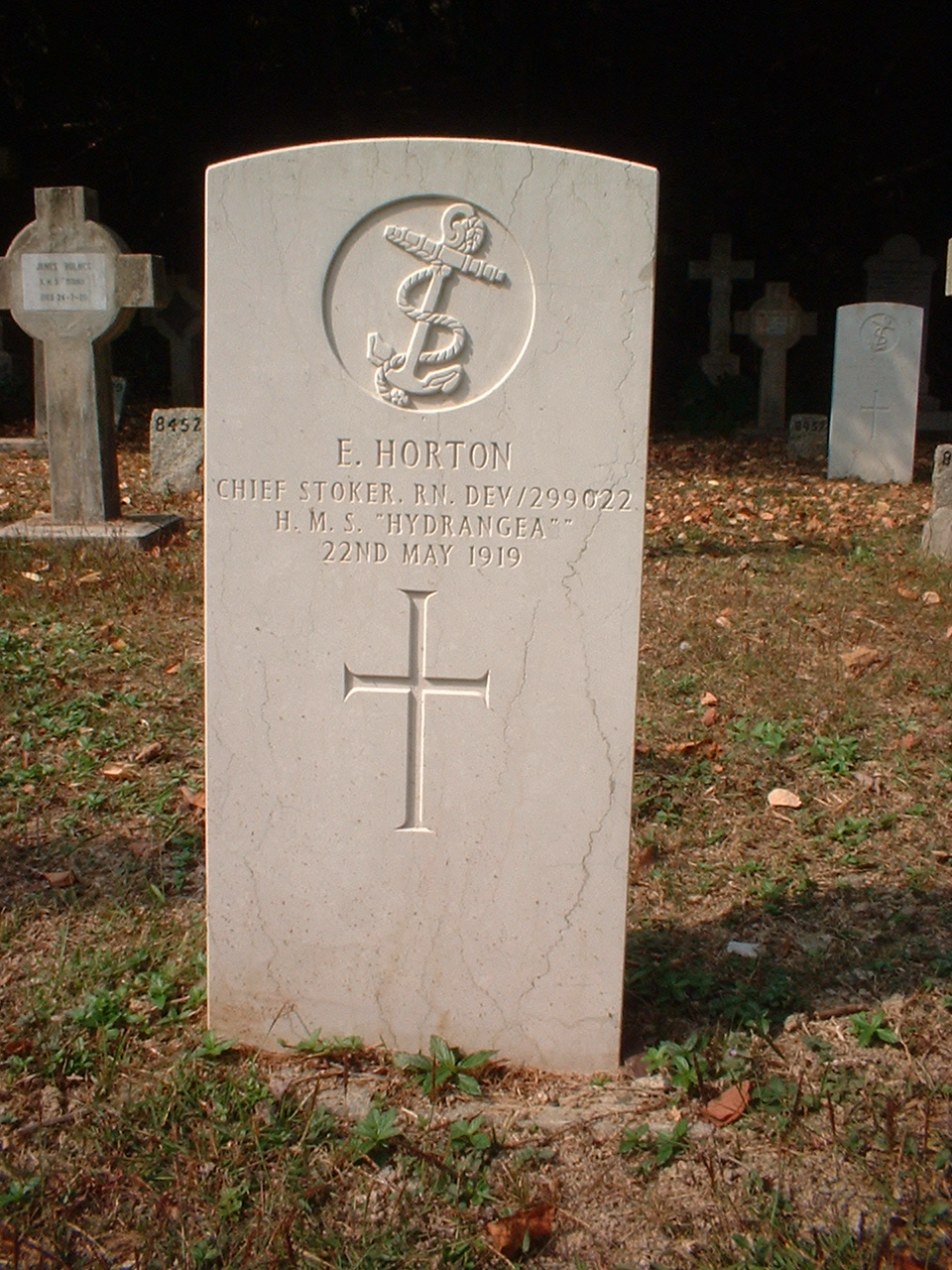
A Royal Navy grave of WWI at Hong Kong (Happy Valley) cemetery.

As the name states, this category of graves for British military dead, spanned from the late 19th century until the early 1960s (when the Government of Hong Kong established another cemetery near Sai Wan for military dead in 1965). At the beginning of the colonial era, the British garrison force had the same problem as those in India: weather. Some of the members of the force could not adapt to the tropical weather of Hong Kong and died owing to tropical disease, while others fell during the Boxer Rebellion – mainly in 1900. At the time being, it is the major cemetery for military dead along with Stanley Military Cemetery.

There are about 100 military graves of World War I – 79 of them are in Hong Kong Cemetery, mainly the soldiers who died in Hong Kong and Kowloon Military Hospital, which received the sick and wounded from the German-leased territory of Qingdao, on the Shandong peninsula in north-east China. Evidence shows that most of them are naval personnel.

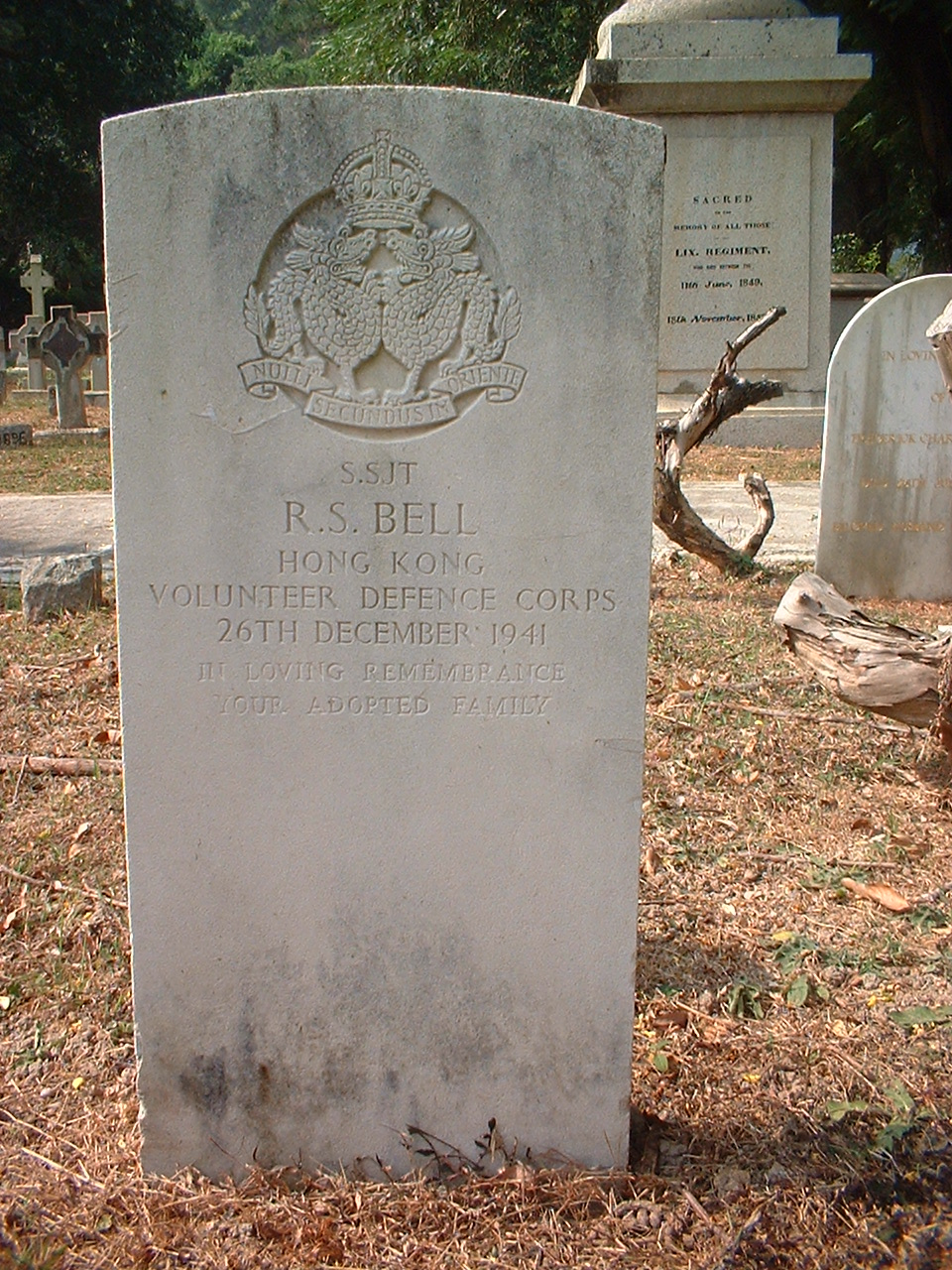
Grave of Staff Serjeant Robert Sidney Bell of the Hong Kong Volunteer Defence Corps, an example of WWII military grave in Hong Kong (Happy Valley) Cemetery.

Before the Japanese invasion of Hong Kong in 1941, Britain had sent two battalions from the Royal Scots and Middlesex Regiments to Hong Kong for garrison duty. This cemetery provides evidence of the presence of these two battalions. There are in all 62 military graves of World War II Commonwealth service personnel – mainly from the year 1941 – maintained by the Commonwealth War Graves Commission.

The British force in Hong Kong used the cemetery as their burial ground until 1965. One notable military burial is Driver Joseph Hughes, a recipient of the George Cross.

There are also two monuments erected by the Royal Artillery in memory of their fallen comrades, which were later moved to the Hong Kong Museum of Coastal Defence.

=== Civilian graves ===
The civilian burials in the cemetery are diverse and exemplify the social structure at the early stage of the colonial era. It is widely understood that the cemetery is for the burial of the privileged group of the society, mostly British. Notable people of that era buried in the cemetery include Sir Robert Ho Tung and his first wife, Sir Paul Chater and Sir Kai Ho. Most Christian missionaries to Hong Kong are also buried here, a notable example being Karl Friedrich August Gützlaff, a German missionary who helped to establish Lutheran churches in Hong Kong, who is considered the first Lutheran missionary to China. Another notable missionary interred here is Henrietta Hall Shuck, the first American female missionary to China.

There are also a number of Chinese burials, all of them Christians, some of them were involved in the late Qing revolution and uprisings led by Sun Yat-sen, including Yeung Ku-wan, who was assassinated by the Qing Government in Hong Kong.

A number of Japanese were buried in the cemetery, mostly those who resided in Hong Kong during the early colonial era. Some of them were Christian, but most were followers of Shinto. The Japanese custom of burning incense during memorial rites led to complaints from some Westerners. As a result, a special Japanese section of the graveyard was designated.

== Burials ==
Notable burials at Hong Kong Cemetery include:

- Henry Fletcher Hance (1827–1886), British diplomat and botanist
- Walter Fong (1866-1906), Chinese-American educator and founder of the first technical college in Hong Kong
- Prof Robert Kirk FRSE (1905–1962), Scottish pathologist and parasitologist
- Wong Tape (1875–1967), Chinese merchant in Dunedin, New Zealand and member of the Urban Council, Hong Kong
- Samuel Cornell Plant (1866–1921), first to command a merchant steamer plying on the Upper Yangtze River, First Senior River Inspector for Upper Yangtze
- Josephine Bracken (August 9, 1876 – March 14, 1902) was the common-law wife of Philippine nationalist José Rizal.

== In popular culture ==
A scene in John le Carré's novel The Honourable Schoolboy takes place in the nearby racetrack as well as the cemetery.

The cemetery is a popular place for filming movies and TV shows. The UK folk artist Johnny Flynn released a song in 2008 about the cemetery, found on the album A Larum.

== Gallery ==
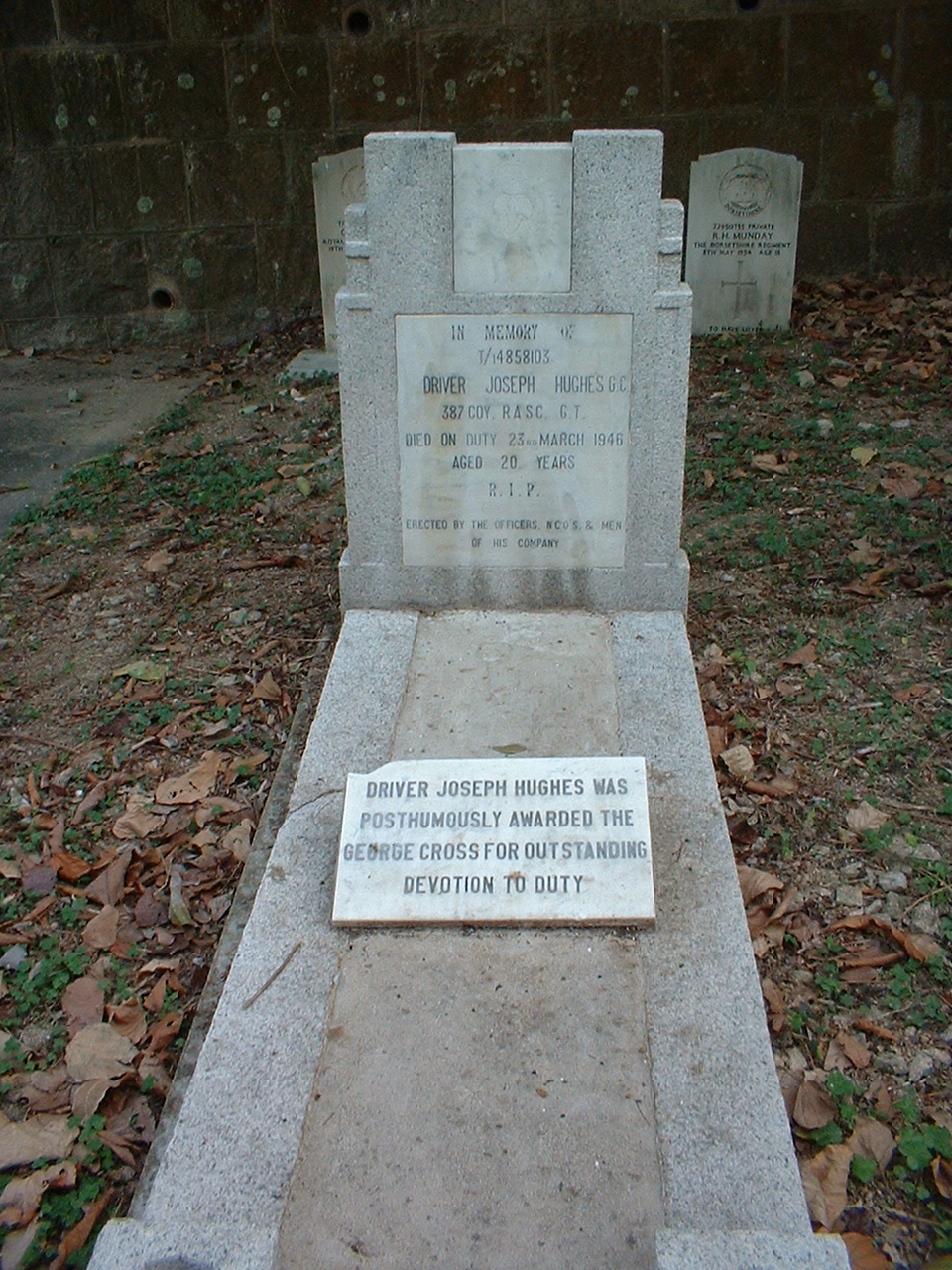
Grave of Driver Joseph Hughes GC, who won the George Cross due to his warning of bombs to his fellows in Hong Kong Cemetery.

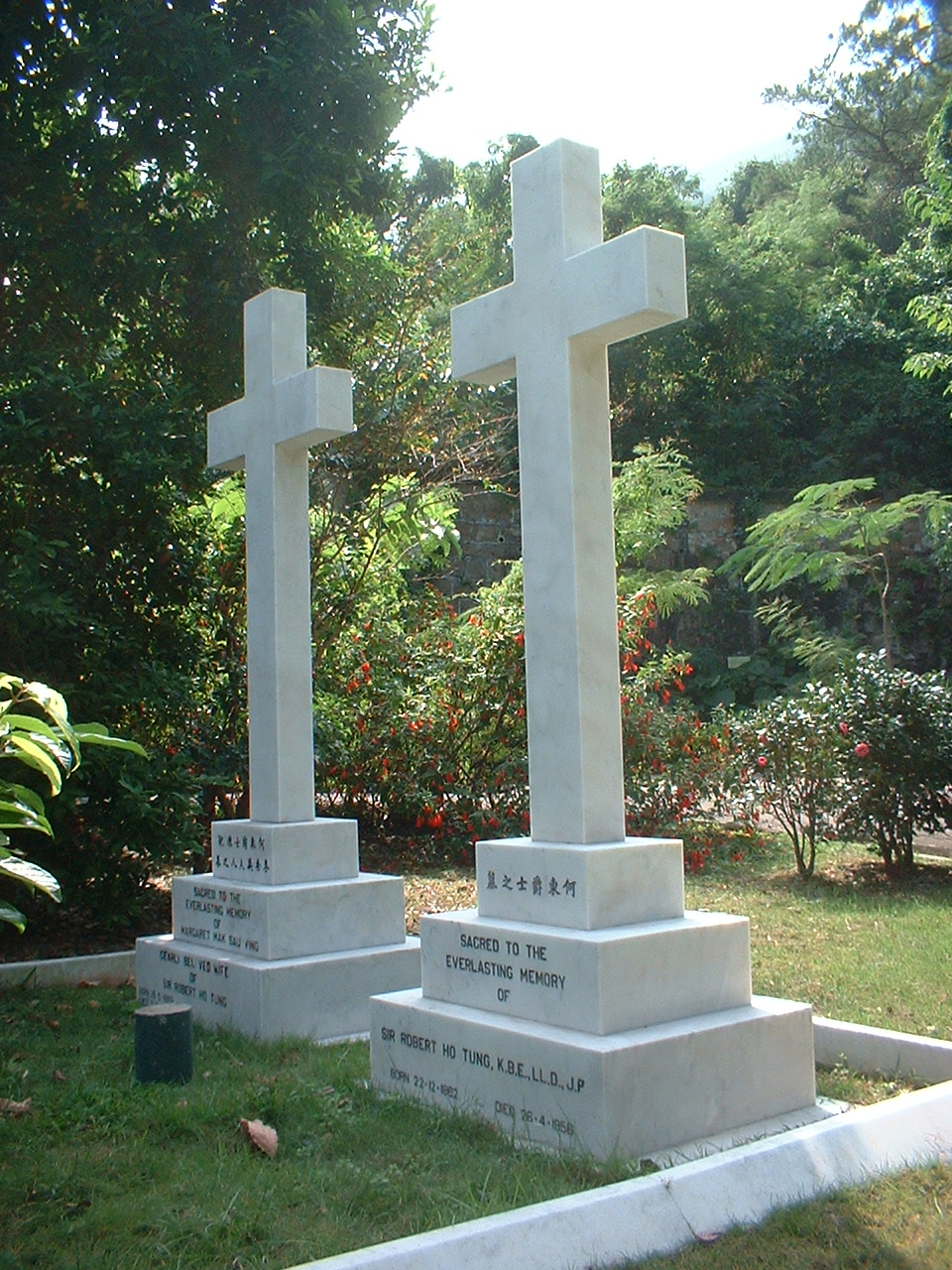
Graves of Sir Robert Ho Tung and his first wife Margaret Mak Sau Ying in Hong Kong Cemetery.

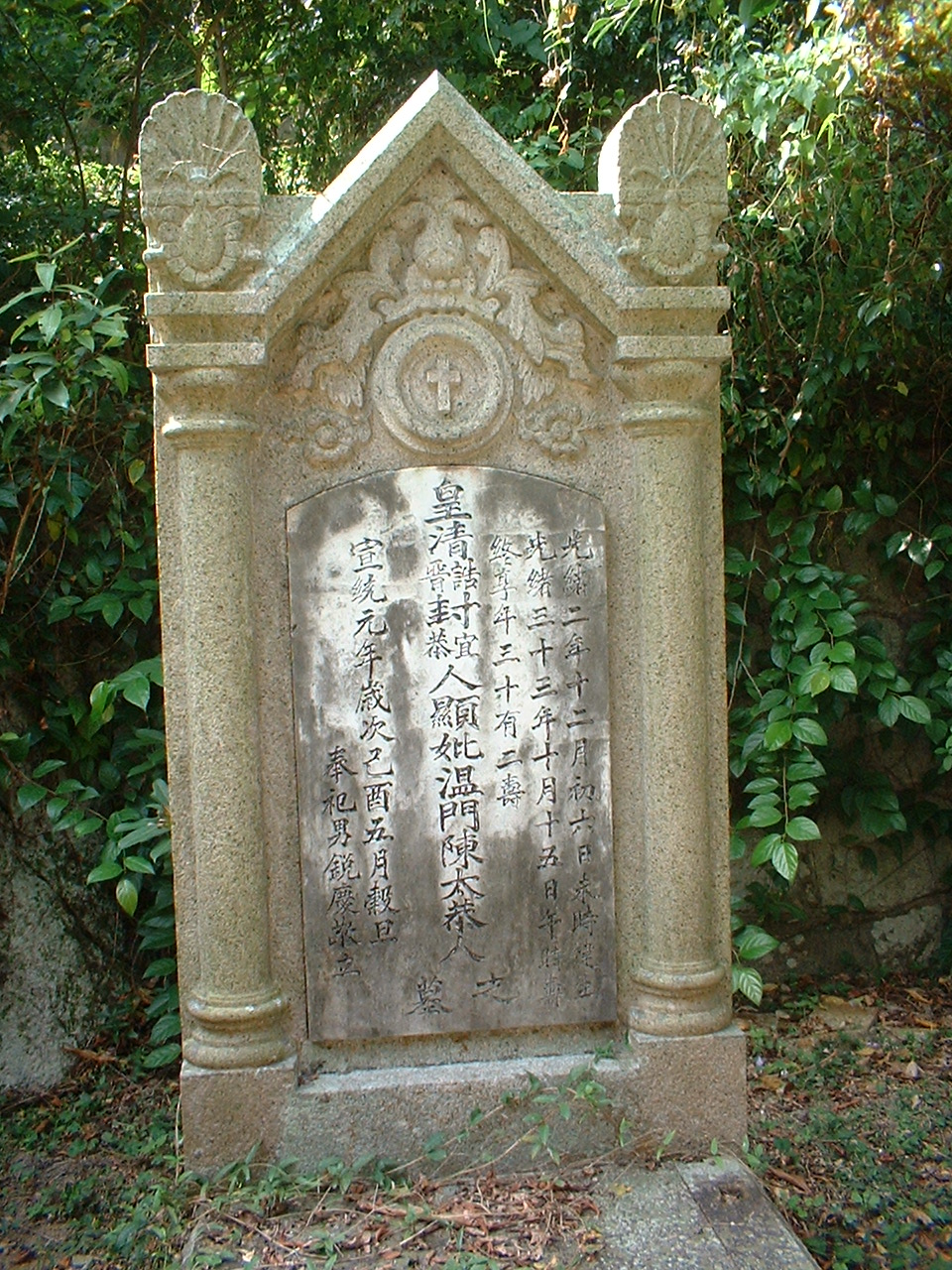
An example of Chinese grave in Hong Kong Cemetery.

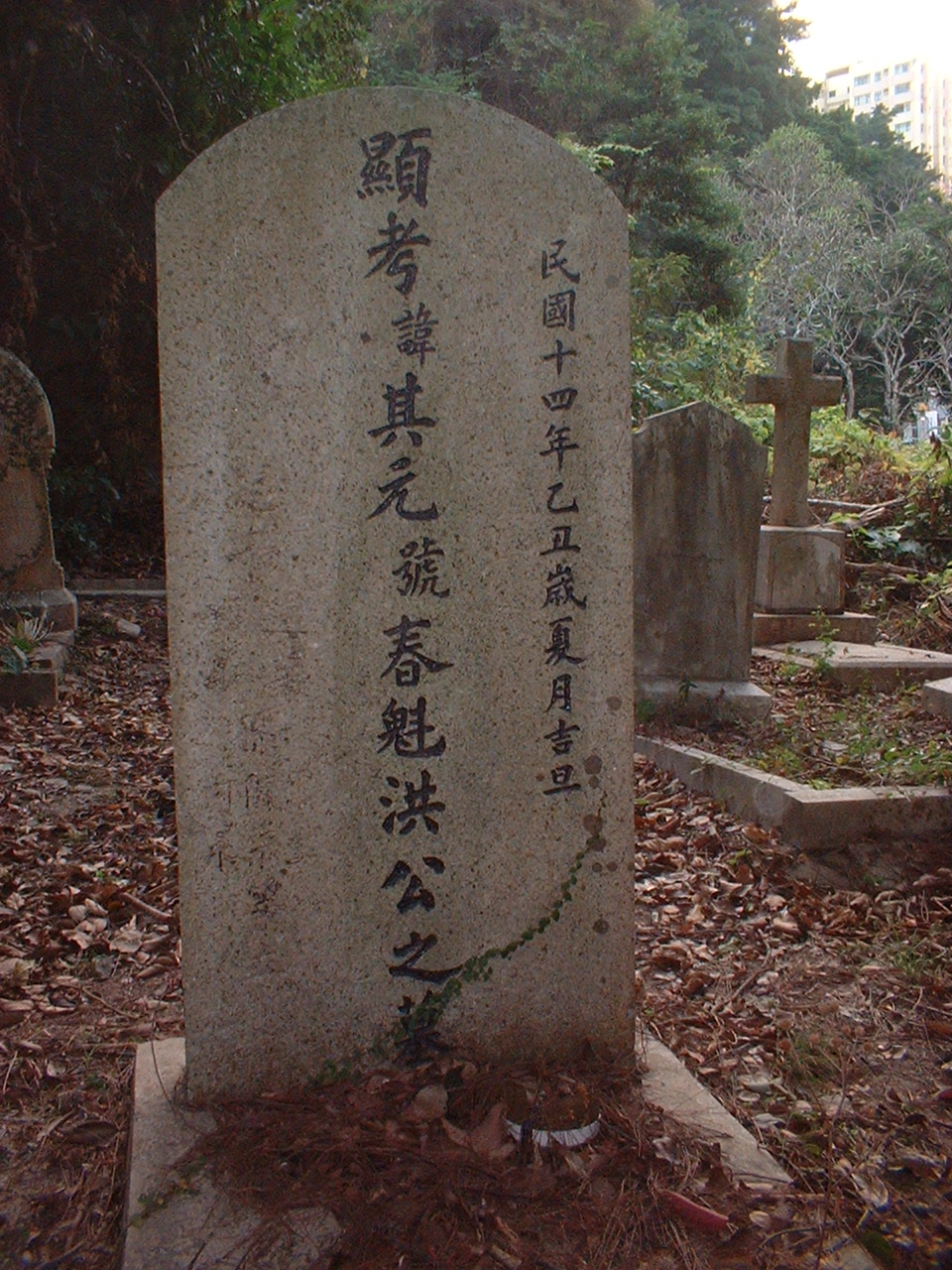
Grave of Hung Chuen Fook, one of the figures of Xinhai Revolution. He is a descendant of Hóng Xiùquán, the major figure of Taiping Rebellion.

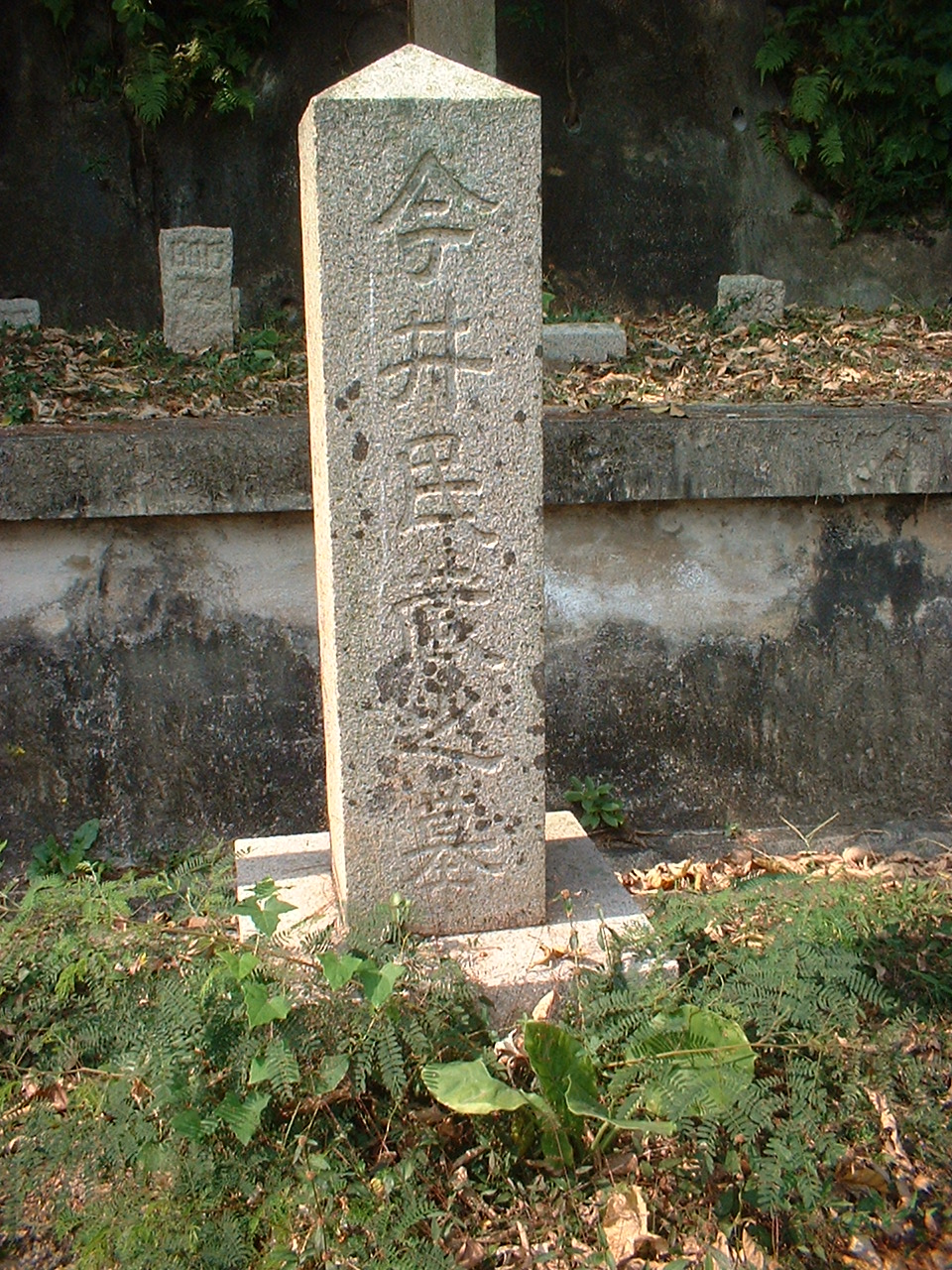
A traditional Japanese grave in Hong Kong Cemetery.

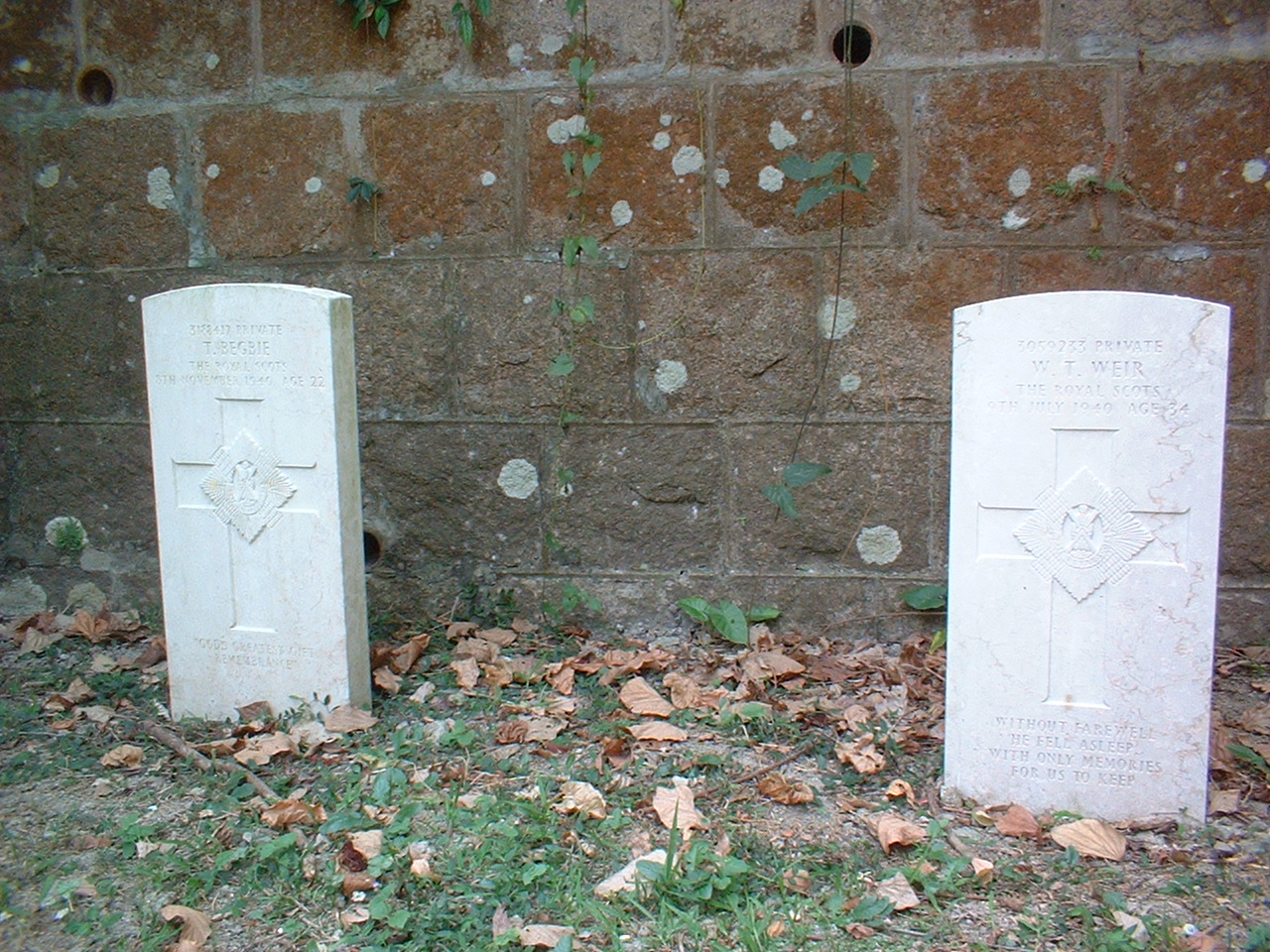
Graves of the members of Royal Scots, one of garrison battalions at Hong Kong before the Japanese invasion on Hong Kong, in Hong Kong Cemetery.

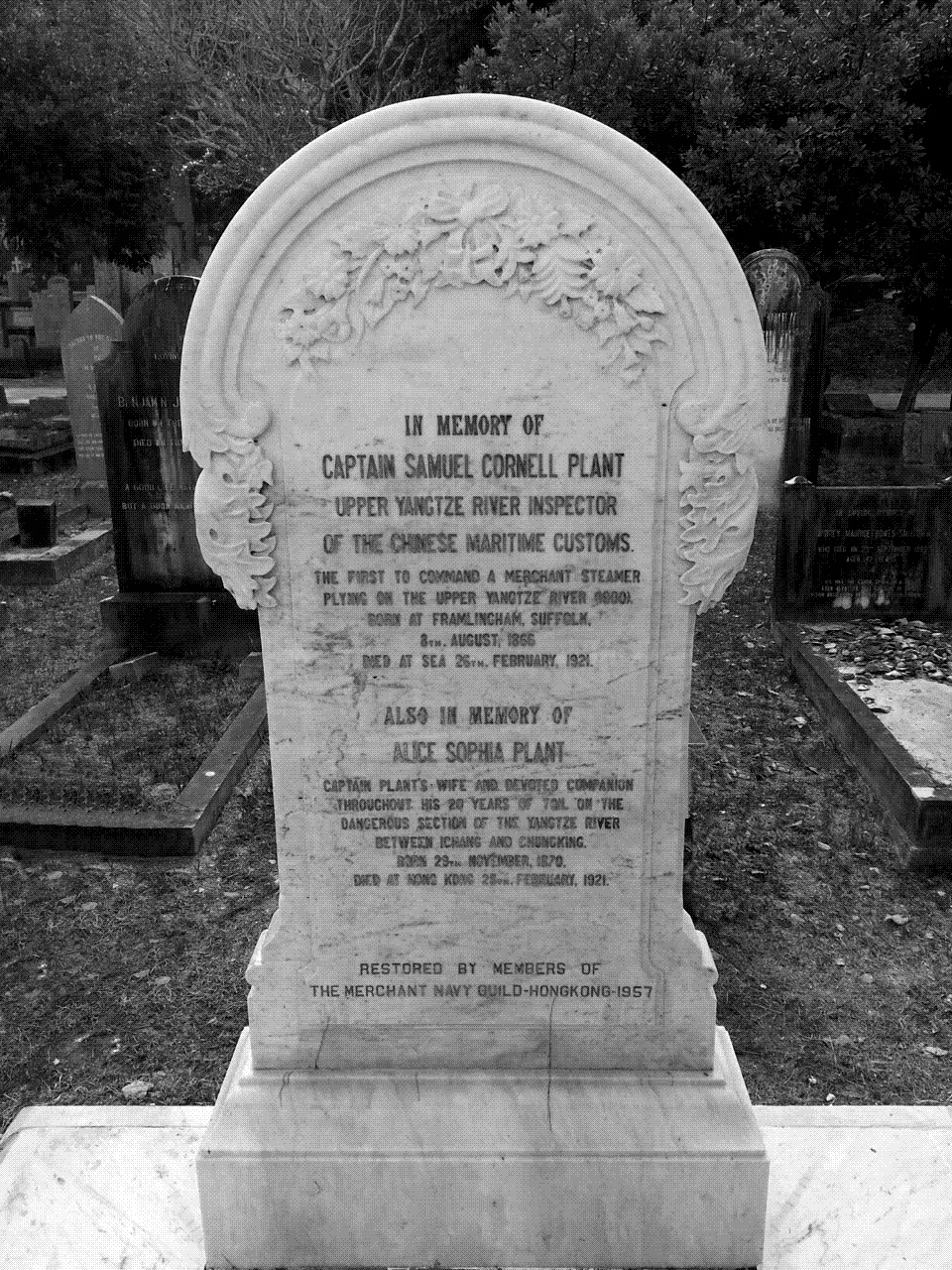
Grave of Samuel Cornell Plant and wife Alice. Plant commanded the first regular steam service on Upper Yangtze.

== See also ==
- List of cemeteries in Hong Kong
