= Joe Hughes (British Army soldier) =

Recipient of the George Cross

Joseph Hughes
- Born: 1 September 1926; Glasgow, Scotland
- Died: 23 March 1946 (aged 19); Hong Kong
- Military career
- Allegiance: United Kingdom
- Branch: British Army
- Rank: Driver
- Service number: T/14858103
- Unit: Royal Army Service Corps
- Conflicts: Second World War
- Awards: George Cross

Joseph Hughes, GC (1 September 1926 – 23 March 1946) was a British soldier and a recipient of the George Cross, awarded for the gallantry he displayed on 21 March 1946 in Lyemun Barracks in Hong Kong. Notice of his award appeared in the London Gazette of 26 June 1947.

== Military career ==
The 19-year-old Hughes was driving a 3-ton truck full of cleared ammunition and explosives into the magazine area when it caught fire. Knowing it could explode at any moment, he tried to remove the burning camouflage netting and, when that failed, tackled the developing blaze with fire extinguishers. Despite his efforts the lorry exploded and Hughes died two days later of his wounds.

A plaque containing a replica of his medal and summary of his action hangs in the St. Francis Centre in the Gorbals in Glasgow, where Hughes was born.

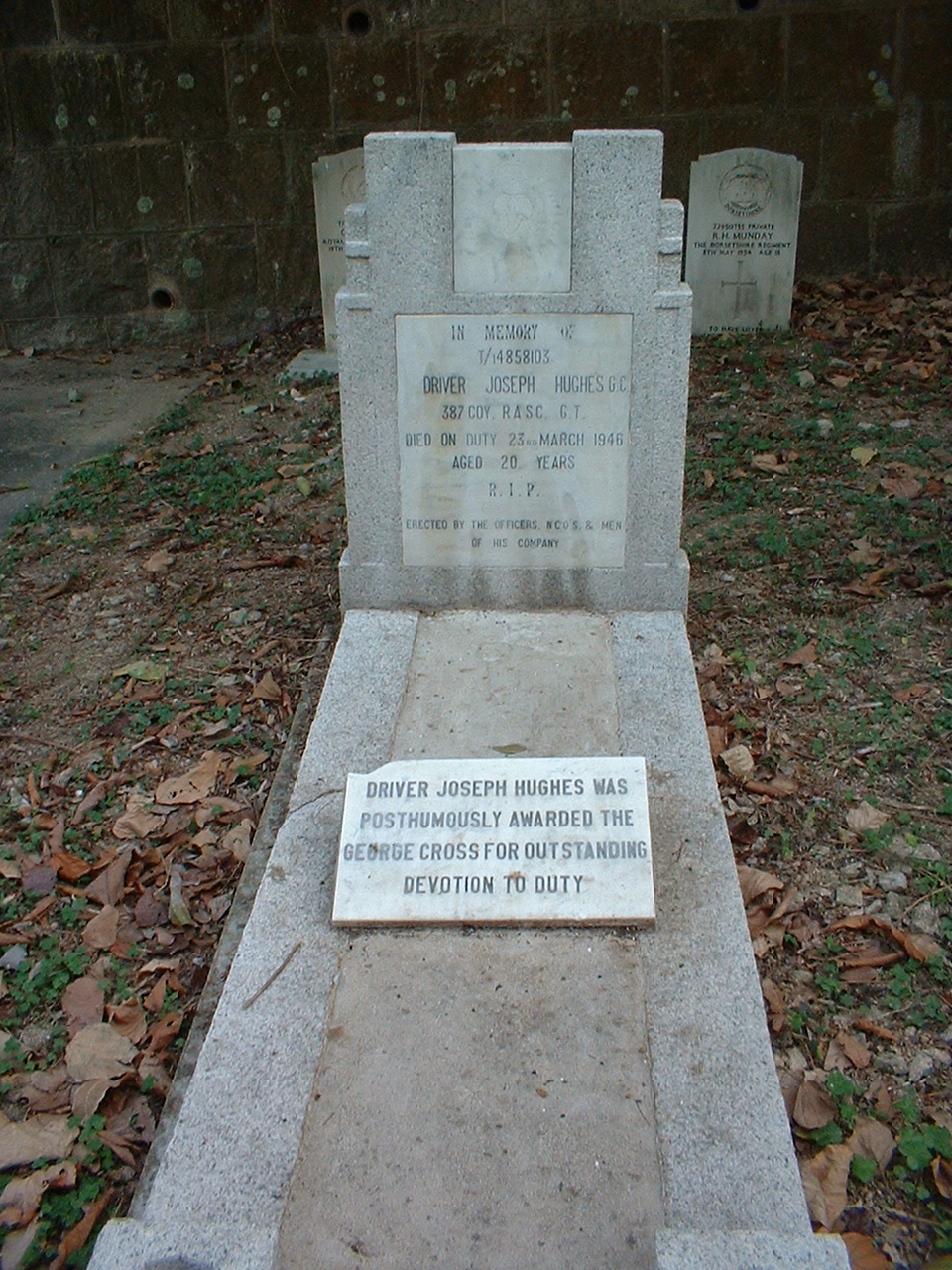
Hughes' grave at Hong Kong Cemetery
