= List of killings by law enforcement officers in the United States, December 2024 =

This is a list of people reported killed by non-military law enforcement officers in the United States in December 2024, whether in the line of duty or not, and regardless of reason or method. The listing documents the occurrence of a death, making no implications regarding wrongdoing or justification on the part of the person killed or officer involved. Killings are arranged by date of the incident that caused death. Different death dates, if known, are noted in the description. The table below lists 125 people.

== December 2024 ==
Date	Name (age) of deceased	Race	Location	Description
2024-12-31	James Junior Holder (41)	Unknown	Chattanooga, Tennessee	During traffic stop on a man on a motorcycle, deputies found out that the man was being wanted with outstanding warrants. As they attempted to arrest him, he displayed a gun. At which point, deputies shot and killed him.
2024-12-31	Moses Alik (22)	Asian	Celina, Ohio	At a gas station, Alik charged at a deputy with a knife and was shot. Less lethal devices were ineffective. He was sent to a hospital where he was pronounced dead.
2024-12-30	Nathan Paul (43)	White	West Point, Utah	A Davis County sheriff's deputy was dispatched to Paul's home after reports of a "domestic issue". When the deputies arrived at the home Paul was at, his family members informed them that Paul was possibly experiencing mental health episode. The deputies also noticed Paul was armed. De-escalation tactics were reportedly unsuccessful. Two Clinton police officers then shot Paul.
2024-12-30	Kenneth Thaddeus Roberts Jr (48)	Unknown	Indianapolis, Indiana	Roberts fled a traffic stop which led police on a pursuit. During the pursuit, he left a woman behind before opened fire on the officers. After the chase, another shootout occurred. SWAT officers eventually found him dead in the vehicle later.
2024-12-30	Unidentified male	Unknown	Sacramento, California	Two Sacramento County Sheriff's Deputies responded to a house in South Sacramento following reports of a man hallucinating. When deputies arrived at the home, the man's mother told the deputies that the man was armed with a kitchen knife. At some point the man approached the front door with the large kitchen knife. After de-escalate tactics failed, one of the deputies shot the man. The man was pronounced dead at the scene.
2024-12-30	Timothy Woods (26)	Black	Orlando, Florida	Police responded to a domestic disturbance at a house in The Willows neighborhood and encountered Woods. Woods was shot and killed by police after he reportedly tried to grab an officer's firearm.
2024-12-29	Benjamin Prince Bradley (47)	White	Los Angeles, California	
2024-12-29	Joshua Musselman (29)	White	Spokane, Washington	
2024-12-29	Jordan Parisien (32)	Native American	Belcourt, North Dakota	Bureau of Indian Affairs agents responded to reports of an armed and suicidal man after he was reported for performing U-turns on the highway. A BIA agent fatally shot Parisien for unknown reasons. The BIA stated Parisien did not fire a weapon.
2024-12-28	Unidentified male	Unknown	Portland, Oregon	A Port of Portland officer tased a man who was cutting himself in Portland International Airport. The man died shortly after.
2024-12-28	Michael McGale Phillips Jr. (27)	Black	Lorenzo, Texas	Phillips fled a traffic stop which resulted a pursuit. After the chase, a deputy attempted to arrest him, but he resisted. Another passenger in the vehicle then began assaulting the deputy, interfering the arrest. The deputy ultimately discharged his gun, killing him. A taser was deployed twice but it was ineffective.
2024-12-28	Charles McCauley (36)	White	Kirbyville, Texas	
2024-12-28	Joseph Dominic Mason (66)	White	Travelers Rest, South Carolina	An armed and suicidal subject was shot and killed by police during the encounter.
2024-12-28	Brian Donald Miller (47)	Unknown	Maybee, Michigan	
2024-12-28	Lucas Armstrong (28)	White	Charlotte, North Carolina	A man armed with a gun was shot and killed by a Charlotte-Mecklenburg Police officer outside Coyote Joe's.
2024-12-27	Unidentified male	Unknown	Denver, Colorado	Police received a report of a man tampering with an external electrical box on the outside of a building and also attempted to break into a car. A fight between the suspect and officers occurred when they tried to arrest him. The suspect experienced a medical emergency and ultimately died in hospital 2 days later.
2024-12-27	Alexis Salas (30)	Hispanic	Anaheim, California	Four officers fatally shot a man who was reportedly involved in a robbery. A replica gun was recovered from the scene.
2024-12-27	Jason Wilkins (49)	Unknown	Miami, Oklahoma	A Miami officer fatally shot Wilkins as he charged toward them with a large metal spike.
2024-12-27	Mark Coleman (45)	Unknown	Pittsburgh, Pennsylvania	Coleman exchanged gunfire with police twice during a standoff, the second time resulting in fatal injuries to Coleman.
2024-12-27	Tyler Holloway (26)	White	Tidewater, Oregon	Holloway and other residents of a farm called 911 to report their neighbor had shot and killed their friend. Six and a half hours later, SWAT officers arrived and shot Holloway, who was holding a gun. Authorities said Holloway had fired a shot at officers as they approached in the rain, while a lawsuit said he had only turned around with the gun after hearing a noise. The neighbor was later arrested and charged with second-degree murder.
2024-12-26	Widlerson Pierre (21)	Black	Orlando, Florida	Pierre, a vehicle burglary suspect, was shot and killed outside an apartment complex by an off-duty corrections officer.
2024-12-26	Tyler Balaskovits (31)	White	Plymouth, California	Police responded to a report of a car blocking the road. Upon arrival, an officer approached the man after he ignored the officer's commands to stop pushing the car in the direction of opposing lane. The officer found the man was armed and the police shooting occurred. The man, Balaskovits, died from his injuries.
2024-12-25	David J. Malito (39)	Unknown	Joliet, Illinois	A man having an erratic behavior was handcuffed by the police. After yelling, struggling with the officers and falling to the ground, he was transported to a medical center and died as a result.
2024-12-25	Ashley Rae Johnston (30)	Native American	Juneau, Alaska	A Juneau officer shot and killed a woman who was armed with a hatchet and kept walking toward him. A taser was deployed but it was not effective.
2024-12-24	Jeremy Sanchez (26)	Unknown	Fresno, California	A parole officer shot and killed his parolee, Sanchez, following a physical altercation during a home visit. The California Department of Justice said they would investigate the shooting due to a state law requiring them to investigate all fatal shootings where the decedent is unarmed.
2024-12-24	Roberto Carlos Rodriguez Zayas (38)	Hispanic	Chattanooga, Tennessee	
2024-12-24	Allie Kundert (26)	White	Hughes, Arkansas	Police responded to a report of a woman armed with a gun causing disturbance. They shot and killed her during the encounter.
2024-12-24	Christopher Gorak (50)	White	Middletown, Ohio	Police responded to a call of two men fighting in an apartment. When they knocked on the door after announcing themselves, Gorak pointed a gun at them. They shot and killed him in response.
2024-12-24	Christopher Evans (35)	Unknown	Logansport, Indiana	Police responded to a report that two people had been stabbed. When a deputy went to get additional supplies while they were treating one of the injured individual, Evans charged at the deputy with a knife and got shot. The shooting is justified by county attorney.
2024-12-24	Unidentified male (33)	Unknown	Clarksville, Arkansas	
2024-12-24	Marvin Salamanca Garcia (35)	Unknown	Gaithersburg, Maryland	
2024-12-23	Douglas Harless (61)	White	London, Kentucky	London Police officers were executing a search warrant in relation to a stolen weed eater when an officer discharged his service weapon, killing Harless. He reportedly pointed a gun at them. Neighbors stated they believed the officers had entered the wrong home.
2024-12-23	Drew Patterson Banks (41)	White	Hartselle, Alabama	
2024-12-22	Logan Tyler Swanson (24)	White	Robertsdale, Alabama	
2024-12-21	Unidentified male	Unknown	Sanford, North Carolina	
2024-12-21	Matthew H. Luke (49)	Unknown	Lafayette, Wisconsin	
2024-12-21	Ollie Denise Rogers (62)	White	Sopchoppy, Florida	Wakulla County Sheriff's deputies arrived at a house after receiving reports that woman with a gun. When they encountered the woman, she reportedly fired a gun into the air before retreating back inside the home. The Leon County Sheriff's Offices SWAT team was called to situation. At an unknown point, the woman was shot and pronounced dead at the scene. What caused the deputies to shoot the woman is currently unknown.
2024-12-21	Timothy Douglas (48)	Black	Hammond, Louisiana	A deputy shot a car thief during a physical altercation. Police stated that Douglas, the thief, was armed.
2024-12-21	John Darrel Schultz (53)	White	Killeen, Texas	State troopers attempted to pull over a suspected drunk driver. The man drove into the parking lot of the Killeen Mall before driving through the entrance of a JCPenney, injuring five people. Police shot and killed the man.
2024-12-21	Grady Evan McIntosh (51)	White	Erwin, Tennessee	After Erwin Police responded to a noise complaint, they heard a shotgun rack and identify themselves. The man then opened the door and pointed the shotgun at them before being fatally shot by at least two officers.
2024-12-21	Unidentified male (40s)	Unknown	Jacksonville, Florida	A pedestrian was fatally struck by a police vehicle operated by an off-duty officer.
2024-12-20	Chadwick Kelly (33)	White	La Belle, Missouri	
2024-12-20	Michael Shope (42)	White	Clyde, North Carolina	
2024-12-20	Jordan Keith Proctor (30)	Black	White Plains, Maryland	
2024-12-20	Peter Hodge (50)	White	San Francisco, California	Hodge, who was a suspected in a hit-and-run earlier in the day, was shot by a San Francisco officer at the intersection of Grant Avenue and Post Street in the Financial District.
2024-12-19	Kyle Davis (32)	White	Greene County, Arkansas	Davis was wanted for a residential burglary in Paragould. Greene County Sheriff deputies, as well as Paragould, Arkansas State police officers fatally shot him shortly after a vehicle pursuit ended. Police stated that Davis approached them with an axe and a shotgun after they performed a PIT maneuver on his vehicle.
2024-12-19	Najeem A Jordan (50)	Black	High Point, North Carolina	Police fatally shot a man outside of an McDonald's restaurant. The man was exhibiting erratic behavior and had cut himself with a razor. The chief said officers shot the man after his actions "escalated".
2024-12-19	Alex Russell (23)	Unknown	Gahanna, Ohio	
2024-12-19	Oylin Antonio Menocal Antunez (25)	Hispanic	Indianapolis, Indiana	
2024-12-19	Unidentified male	Unknown	Filer, Idaho	
2024-12-19	John R. Lyons (24)	White	Berwyn, Illinois	Lyons, suspected of killing three people at a home in Mahomet, was shot and killed by police in Berwyn after he allegedly shot at them. White supremacist Nick Fuentes claimed Lyons was intending to kill him, posting a video of an unidentified man with a gun outside his home.
2024-12-18	Morey Clemmons (39)	Black	Boca Raton, Florida	
2024-12-18	Jose Manuel Ruiz-Sanchez (46)	Hispanic	Gonzales, Texas	Ruiz-Sanchez approached DPS Special Response Team members with a weapon while they were serving a warrant on him and was subsequently shot by one of them.
2024-12-18	Unidentified male	Unknown	Lewisburg, Kentucky	When deputies were attempting to arrest a man having an active arrest warrant, the man pointed a gun at them before being shot and killed.
2024-12-18	Marion Joyner (62)	White	Phoenix, Arizona	Phoenix Police were called to a Whataburger restaurant after a man reportedly entered the establishment armed with a rifle. Before police can negotiate with the man, the man allegedly fired shots at the officers from inside the restaurant, striking a police vehicle. The man and the officers then exchanged gunfire. At some point the man was fatally shot.
2024-12-17	Eden Jade Colbert (1)	White	New Madrid County, Missouri	Dustin Colbert, an off-duty New Madrid County Sheriff's deputy was in a personal vehicle with his two daughters. He lost control of the vehicle and veered across the centerline, striking another vehicle. Colbert, both of his daughters and Debose, the driver of the second vehicle, all succumbed to their injuries after the collision.
2024-12-17	Dixie Shae Colbert (4)	White	New Madrid County, Missouri	Dustin Colbert, an off-duty New Madrid County Sheriff's deputy was in a personal vehicle with his two daughters. He lost control of the vehicle and veered across the centerline, striking another vehicle. Colbert, both of his daughters and Debose, the driver of the second vehicle, all succumbed to their injuries after the collision.
2024-12-17	Nevaeh Ladiamond Debose (17)	Black	New Madrid County, Missouri	Dustin Colbert, an off-duty New Madrid County Sheriff's deputy was in a personal vehicle with his two daughters. He lost control of the vehicle and veered across the centerline, striking another vehicle. Colbert, both of his daughters and Debose, the driver of the second vehicle, all succumbed to their injuries after the collision.
2024-12-17	Kaja Pendic	White	Apache Junction, Arizona	An Apache Junction police vehicle collided with another vehicle while the officers were responding to a 911 call. The driver of the vehicle succumbed to her injuries.
2024-12-17	Jeffrey Stoppenhagen (51)	White	Fort Wayne, Indiana	Allen County Sheriff's Department received reports of a man armed with a gun and was having a mental health crisis. The armed man reportedly exited the residence twice in the incident. Police shot and killed him the second time he exited the residence.
2024-12-17	Jeffery Lynn Marchbanks Jr. (35)	White	North Little Rock, Arkansas	A suspect who reportedly robbed a Casey's gas station was shot and killed by North Little Rock Police officers. Details of the shooting are currently limited.
2024-12-17	Robert Barry (55)	Unknown	Viera, Florida	Brevard County Sheriff's Office responded to a report of a man threatening a woman with a gun and a knife. When they attempted to make contact with the man, he was not cooperative and was making threats. At some point, he came out the home with a gun. Deputies shot him after he reportedly pointed the gun at them. He was taken to a hospital where he died.
2024-12-16	Jason Cain (31)	Unknown	Liberty, Ohio	Marked and unmarked police units blocked a stolen vehicle to stop potential pursuit. When police officers ordered Cain to come out, he refused to comply and started ramming police vehicles. An officer then fired his gun, striking Cain, as he placed them in danger. Cain was transported to St. Elizabeth's Hospital where he died 3 days later.
2024-12-16	Jefte Vargas Ramirez (37)	Hispanic	Redlands, California	A sheriff's deputy responded to a reported trespasser and encountered Vargas Ramirez. The deputy fatally shot Vargas Ramirez after he allegedly approached the deputy holding rocks in both hands.
2024-12-16	Robert Harrison (80)	White	Jackson, Tennessee	Deputies responded to a disturbance and heard a gunshot. One of them shot and killed Harrison, who refused to drop his gun.
2024-12-16	Jose Moreno (46)	Unknown	El Monte, California	Police received reports of a man armed with a gun causing disturbance. The suspect reportedly had been caught stealing goods from a store and brandished the gun, according to Los Angeles County Sheriff's Department. A police chase ensued after the suspect refused to stop. After the pursuit, the suspect attempted to flee and was fatally shot by police. A gun was recovered at the scene.
2024-12-15	Willie Earl Washington (42)	Unknown	Waterloo, Iowa	Police was pursuing a speeding vehicle which also fled a traffic stop. After disabled it with stop sticks, they took the suspect, Washington, into custody. Washington became unresponsive while handcuffed on the ground and was later pronounced deceased.
2024-12-15	Andrew Mostyn Jr. (23)	White	Port Charlotte, Florida	During a traffic stop, Mostyn shot and killed Corporal Elio Diaz with a rifle. Police tracked him to a Popeyes, where deputies shot him when he allegedly reached for the rifle.
2024-12-15	Timothy Scott (43)	Unknown	San Antonio, Texas	
2024-12-15	Dameion Coonrod (32)	White	Ringgold, Georgia	
2024-12-15	Javier Aguilar (34)	Hispanic	Donna, Texas	Hidalgo County Sheriff's Office responded to a domestic dispute call. When they arrived, a patrol unit was intentionally hit by a car at a high rate of speed. According to police, Aguilar exited the car and approached a deputy with a threatening manner before being fatally shot.
2024-12-14	Alfredo Garcia (45)	Unknown	Horizon City, Texas	Police responded to a call regarding a criminal trespass and violation of a protective order. Upon arrival, Garcia brandished a firearm. When Crisis Negotiation Team attempted to de-escalate the situation, Garcia reportedly approached the officers with a threatening manner before being fatally shot.
2024-12-14	Walter Alfredo Castillo (65)	Unknown	San Francisco, California	A San Francisco Police officer hit a pedestrian while he was responding to a report. The pedestrian later died in a hospital.
2024-12-14	Daniel Holmes (39)	White	Selmer, Tennessee	Just after 3 p.m, Selmer Police officers responded to a call of a suspicious person outside a home. Upon arrival, Holmes ambushed and killed McNairy County Sergeant Rick Finley. The second responding officer returned fire, killing Holmes.
2024-12-14	Caden Sjobeck (18)	Unknown	Morehead City, North Carolina	
2024-12-14	Robert Drangel (64)	White	Fort Lauderdale, Florida	
2024-12-13	Dean Ackerman (33)	Unknown	Colorado Springs, Colorado	
2024-12-13	Matthew Granado (32)	Hispanic	Tempe, Arizona	During a drug deal, the suspect was pulled over by an officer. The suspect fled and opened fire on the officer, striking his leg. The officer then returned fire, killing the suspect.
2024-12-13	Arthur Armstrong Jr. (26)	Black	DeSoto, Texas	DeSoto Police responded to a call by a man stating he had several weapons and wanted to harm the police. Upon arrival, the man advanced towards the officers with a knife in each hand. After ignoring multiple commands to drop the knife, the man was shot once in the chest. He was taken to the hospital where he succumbed to his injuries.
2024-12-13	Alexander Hilton Randles	White	Gulf Shores, Alabama	A man was shot and killed while FBI agents were attempting to serve an arrest warrant.
2024-12-13	Fernando Jimenez-Jimenez (31)	Hispanic	Las Vegas, Nevada	Off-duty Metropolitan Police Officer Colton Pulsipher collided with a wrong-way driver on Interstate 15 in Nevada while he was heading home. Both himself and the driver died. Jimenez-Jimenez was in the US illegally.
2024-12-12	Tyrence Vann (54)	Black	Greensboro, North Carolina	A Greensboro police vehicle struck and killed a pedestrian.
2024-12-12	Jairo Rodriguez (53)	Hispanic	Newark, New Jersey	An off-duty sergeant struck and killed Officer Jairo Rodriguez, who was working on traffic control.
2024-12-12	Unidentified male	Unknown	King of Prussia, Pennsylvania	
2024-12-11	Larissa Alexander (16)	White	Washington County, Oregon	An off-duty correctional officer killed his daughter and himself in a murder-suicide.
2024-12-11	Benjamin Grube (24)	Unknown	El Cajon, California	Grube, a driver of a pickup truck, veered into a sidewalk, striking Sgt. Kevin Maxwell outside the police station. When she tried to ramm other police vehicles, Maxwell and another officer on scene opened fire, killing her.
2024-12-11	Unidentified male	Unknown	Magnolia, Texas	During a domestic dispute investigation, the suspect refused to comply with the deputies' commands and punched one of them in the face when they tried to detain him. One of the deputies tased the man but it was ineffective. When the second deputy stepped in to help, he grabbed the deputy's gun and attempted to pull it out. The first deputy shot and killed the suspect as the situation escalated.
2024-12-11	Jamin David Elkins (46)	Black	Rainbow City, Alabama	According to police, a domestic incident investigation escalated to a hostage situation. Police officers shot and killed Elkins after he fired at them.
2024-12-11	Jalen Moore (21)	Black	Fort Lauderdale, Florida	
2024-12-11	Cedric Butler (27)	Unknown	Arlington, Virginia	Police received a call about a suspicious person who was reportedly displaying a knife in front of employees at a Safeway grocery store. They then tracked the man to a metro station. After being confronted, a struggle ensued, during which an officer opened fire. The man was taken to a hospital where he died from his injuries. Two officers sustained non-life-threatening injuries.
2024-12-10	Robert Brooks (43)	Black	Marcy, New York	At Marcy Correctional Facility, Brooks who was an inmate at the prison, died after reportedly being assaulted by corrections officers. Governor Kathy Hochul condemned Brook's death and recommended termination of the fourteen people who were allegedly involved in Brooks death.
2024-12-10	Regina Beckett (64)	Unknown	Jemison, Alabama	A Calera police officer was involved in a head-on crash at an intersection that killed a woman. The female officer was seriously injured.
2024-12-10	Santiago Gutierrez (29)	Hispanic	Harrisburg, Pennsylvania	A man was shot multiple times while ramming police cars with a tractor-trailer. The man was previously wanted for the murder of another man before he was killed.
2024-12-10	Unidentified male	Unknown	Oshkosh, Wisconsin	
2024-12-10	Zachary Lewis (24)	Unknown	East Los Angeles, California	
2024-12-10	Chaz Macabee	Unknown	Buena Park, California	Buena Park officers responded to assist CHP for reports of a potentially armed man. During the encounter, an officer-involved shooting occurred which left the man dead. Details are currently limited.
2024-12-09	Tammie Pickelsimer (66)	White	Rome, Georgia	An officer was responding to a bomb threat targeting U.S. Representative Marjorie Taylor Greene when he collided with a vehicle driven by Pickelsimer as she pulled out of a parking lot. Pickelsimer was taken to the hospital, where she died.
2024-12-09	Daniel H. Kerr (67)	Unknown	Bellevue, Washington	Bellevue Police responded to a call about an individual armed with a knife. About 2 hours later, an officer-involved shooting occurred which left Kerr dead. Bodycam footage shows that Kerr charged toward an officer with a knife before being shot.
2024-12-08	Cesar Reyes II (26)	Hispanic	Las Vegas, Nevada	South Point Hotel security attempted to conduct a welfare check on a room after receiving a report of a suicidal man. They heard the sound of racking of a firearm and called the police. When the Metropolitan Police and SWAT team arrived, they found the man barricaded himself inside the room. After hours of negotiations, the man exited the room with a shotgun and charged toward the police officers before being shot.
2024-12-08	Unidentified female	Unknown	Grand Rapids, Wisconsin	
2024-12-08	Tyler Jacobs (31)	White	Shelby, Ohio	Officers went to an Arby's restaurant to serve a warrant on Jacobs. As an officer attempted to arrest him, he pulled out a knife and stabbed the officer in the neck. He then charged at the officer after stabbing him. The officer opened fire, killing him.
2024-12-07	Anthony Dadante (67)	White	Tampa, Florida	Police received a call from a family member who concerned Dadante had committed suicide since a gunshot was heard. When Hillsborough County Sheriff's Office arrived, they saw Dadante with a gunshot wound on his chest and armed with a gun in a bathtub. Dadante then pointed the gun at one of the deputies, prompting them to fatally shoot him.
2024-12-07	Eric Edwin Bianchi (42)	Unknown	Stanley, North Carolina	Police received a report of Bianchi stabbing himself and there were children inside the home. When the officers arrived, Bianchi refused to follow commands and moved toward them with a machete before being fatally shot.
2024-12-07	John Paul Carter (45)	White	Shelby, North Carolina	Police responded to a hotel, regarding reports of a "domestic dispute". At some point, they encountered a man who was reportedly armed with multiple knives. For reasons currently unknown the man was shot by police.
2024-12-06	Monique Scott (28)	Black	Lauderhill, Florida	A woman was fatally shot by a Lauderhill officer inside an apartment complex after she allegedly charged at the officer with a knife.
2024-12-06	Karl Gibson (45)	White	Titusville, Florida	Police responded to a 911 call for an active domestic violence incident. When police arrived, a man fled the scene in a vehicle. During the subsequent chase, the man pointed a firearm at officers and was fatally shot.
2024-12-05	Jason Paul (47)	White	Egypt Lake-Leto, Florida	Hillsborough County Sheriff's Deputies were summoned to an apartment complex after a person called 911 to report Paul's irregular behavior. When deputies arrived at the apartment complex, they reportedly witnessed Paul holding a woman at knifepoint. After reportedly ignoring commands to discard the knife, Deputy John Howes shot Paul.
2024-12-05	Samuel James (38)	White	Nogales, Arizona	After responding to a report, an officer encountered a man armed with a knife. The man threatened the officer while approaching him with the knife before being fatally shot.
2024-12-05	Christopher Ferguson (21)	Black	Brooklyn, New York	Police were notified of possible shots fired in Brooklyn by the gunshot detection system ShotSpotter. Police later found a vehicle and subsequently followed. After a high-speed pursuit, Ferguson, one of the passengers, pointed a gun at the police and was fatally shot. A female passenger was wounded after the shooting. Police stated that Ferguson was being sought for killing a 21-year-old man in East New York.
2024-12-05	Unidentified male	Unknown	Oak Hill, West Virginia	A woman called 911 to report that she'd been a victim of a stabbing. When Oak Hill Police officers arrived at the home the woman was located, they encountered a man, who was reportedly armed with a shotgun. For reasons currently unknown, the man was fatally shot by the officers. The woman was taken to an hospital.
2024-12-05	Robert McVay (39)	Unknown	Atlanta, Georgia	A man stabbed another person on a bus on Interstate 75 and began acting erratically. As officers encountered him, a foot chase occurred and officers tased the man. Tasers were ineffective and the man kept running away from the police. At some point, he approached the officers with a knife and was shot.
2024-12-05	Michael David Burke (58)	White	Woodbridge, Virginia	A Prince William County Police officer fatally shot Burke at a fire station after Burke reportedly advanced towards the officer with a knife.
2024-12-04	Kamari Gamble (18)	Black	Columbus, Georgia	Police pursued Gamble after he fled a traffic stop. An officer performed a PIT maneuver on Gamble's car, causing him to crash. He was pronounced dead at a hospital.
2024-12-04	Amarion Thomas (17)	Black	Vicksburg, Mississippi	Police served a warrant on a home in relation to a November burglary. Officers shot and killed Thomas after he allegedly pointed a gun at them.
2024-12-04	Jacob T. Lewis (40)	Unknown	Reno, Nevada	For reasons currently unknown, a Washoe County Sheriff's deputy fatally shot a man during a traffic stop in the West University neighborhood.
2024-12-04	Adam Grunt Gunderson (45)	White	Vancouver, Washington	A Vancouver Police officer was involved in a physical fight with Gunderson in a Safeway parking lot. During the fight, Gunderson pulled out a gun and was fatally shot by the officer.
2024-12-04	Christopher Worrell (37)	White	Indianapolis, Indiana	Police responded to a crash. Upon arrival, a man armed with a machete moved quickly toward an officer and ignored his commands. The officer then fatally shot him. The man reportedly rammed into vehicles and stabbed 2 people with the machete.
2024-12-03	Jeffrey Schopp (33)	White	San Antonio, Texas	When a San Antonio Police officer stop Schopp, who was standing in traffic, he fled to a nearby drainage ditch and pointed a semi-automatic handgun at the officer while firing a shot. The officer returned fire, killing him.
2024-12-03	Devin Quinn Fontenot (27)	Black	Jamestown, North Dakota	Police responded to reports that Fontenot, who had been kicked out a bar, was standing outside of it with a knife and gun. Police found Fontenot firing rounds at the bar from outside and fatally shot him.
2024-12-03	Unidentified juvenile (15)	Unknown	La Plata, Maryland	La Plata Police officers were pursuing a stolen vehicle after it was involved in an armed robbery. The stolen vehicle hit a tire deflation device and kept driving at about 100 mph. At some point, the stolen vehicle struck another car, killing one of the suspects, a 15-year-old juvenile. His identity will not be released.
2024-12-02	Leonardo Diaz	Unknown	Torrance, California	A man was shot and killed by police while they were investigating a "suspicious circumstances call".
2024-12-02	Robert Glenn King (40)	Unknown	Lakewood, Colorado	Two Lakewood police officers that responded to a trespass call at a Best Buy store fatally shot the man after he reportedly pointed a firearm in the officer's direction.
2024-12-01	Noe Rodriguez Martinez (31)	Hispanic	Santa Ana, California	A man who was wielding a fake rifle was fatally shot by two Santa Ana police officers.
2024-12-01	Daniel H. Escalera (41)	Hispanic	Saint Charles, Illinois	Police were called to a senior living facility after reports a man was attempting to cut down a tree outside with a chainsaw. Witnesses also stated the man had entered the facility and was pointing the chainsaw at residents. Police used a taser on the man, Escalera, before shooting him.
2024-12-01	Jax Benjamin Melwing (23)	White	Peoria, Arizona	Police were dispatched to a parking lot after a report of a man breaking into vehicles. When officers made contact with the man, he attempted to flee by car, nearly pinning two officers between vehicles. Officers opened fire multiple times and struck him at least once. He died at the scene. Two officers suffered minor injuries.

== See also ==
- Death in custody § United States
- Henry A. Wallace Police Crime Public Database
- List of cases of police brutality
- List of countries with annual rates and counts for killings by law enforcement officers
- List of law enforcement officers killed in the line of duty in the United States
- List of law enforcement officers convicted for an on-duty killing in the United States
- List of shootings by US immigration agents
- List of police reforms related to the George Floyd protests
- List of unarmed African Americans killed by law enforcement officers in the United States
- Lists of killings by law enforcement officers
- Police brutality in the United States
- Police misconduct § United States
- Police riot § United States
- Police use of deadly force in the United States
