= List of law enforcement officers convicted of an on-duty killing in the United States =

This is a list of law enforcement officers convicted for an on-duty killing in the United States. The listing documents the date the incident resulting in conviction occurred, the date the officer(s) was convicted, the name of the officer(s), and a brief description of the original occurrence making no implications regarding wrongdoing or justification on the part of the person killed or officer involved.

== List ==
Incident date	Name of officer	Conviction date	Agency (state)	Description of incident
26 June 2025	Carlos Uribe	4 June 2026 (pleaded guilty)	Newton Police Department (North Carolina)	Uribe pursued Camden Childers, who was on a motorcycle. The chase ended in a cul-de-sac, where Uribe kicked Childers, who was surrendering, then shot him. Uribe pleaded guilty to murder.
1 March 2025	Jonah Levi	1 April 2026	New York State Department of Corrections and Community Supervision (New York)	Multiple guards at Mid-State Correctional Facility beat Messiah Nantwi to death during a struggle. In total, ten guards were charged, six with beating Nantwi and four with assisting in a cover-up. Levi was convicted of manslaughter, gang assault, and conspiracy and acquitted of murder; prosecutors had accused him of stomping on Nantwi's head. Blair pleaded guilty to manslaughter.
1 March 2025	Caleb Blair	4 May 2026 (pleaded guilty)	New York State Department of Corrections and Community Supervision (New York)	Multiple guards at Mid-State Correctional Facility beat Messiah Nantwi to death during a struggle. In total, ten guards were charged, six with beating Nantwi and four with assisting in a cover-up. Levi was convicted of manslaughter, gang assault, and conspiracy and acquitted of murder; prosecutors had accused him of stomping on Nantwi's head. Blair pleaded guilty to manslaughter.
9 December 2024	Christopher Walrath	5 May 2025 (pleaded guilty)	New York State Department of Corrections and Community Supervision (New York)	Multiple correctional officers at Marcy Correctional Facility beat Robert Brooks to death in a medical office the same day he was transferred to Marcy. Six guards were charged with murder, three other guards were charged with manslaughter, and another guard was charged with evidence tampering. Three other guards and a nurse were fired. Walrath, who a prosecutor said left his post to join the beating, was one of the officers charged with murder. He pleaded guilty to manslaughter in 2025. Kingsley was found guilty in 2025, while two other officers were acquitted.
9 December 2024	David Kingsley	20 October 2025	New York State Department of Corrections and Community Supervision (New York)	
11 November 2024	Kyle Kapitanski	4 September 2025 (pleaded guilty)	Shelburne Police Department (Vermont)	Kapitanski was driving five to ten miles per hour above the speed limit in South Burlington when he struck cyclist Sean Hayes at an intersection, where Hayes was walking his bicycle. Evidence showed Kapitanski had several YouTube videos playing on a mounted tablet at the time of the crash. Kapitanski pleaded guilty to misdemeanor negligent operation with death and was sentenced to six to 12 months in jail, suspended, and two years of probation.
6 July 2024	Sean Grayson	29 October 2025	Sangamon County Sheriff's Office (Illinois)	36-year-old Sonya Massey called 911 to report a prowler outside her home. While in her home, Grayson told Massey to move a pot of hot water that was sitting on her stove. When Massey picked up the pot and said "I rebuke you in the name of Jesus", Grayson and a second deputy drew their weapons. Grayson fired three times, wounding her once in the face. Grayson said he believed Massey was going to throw the water at him. He was convicted of second-degree murder.
20 June 2024	Blademir Viveros	23 March 2026	Missouri City Police Department (Texas)	Viveros was responding to a robbery call while a detained man, Michael Hawkins, was in the backseat of his car. According to prosecutors, Viveros was driving more than 100 miles per hour without lights or sirens on. He struck another vehicle, killing Angela Stewart, her 16-year-old son Mason, and Hawkins. Viveros was convicted of three counts of aggravated assault by a public servant.
8 June 2024	Brian Sutton	12 June 2026	Prescott Police Department (Arizona)	Sutton and another officer went to a residential neighborhood to look for Daniel Leslie, wanted for threatening his girlfriend. Sutton found Leslie in a carport and unsuccessfully tried to get Leslie to approach him. Leslie, who was unarmed, ran inside, and Sutton shot him. He was convicted of manslaughter.
9 April 2024	Camden Burch	10 August 2026 (pleaded guilty)	Canton Police Department (Ohio)	Burch and Schoenegge handcuffed Frank Tyson, who had just gotten into a car accident, after he refused to comply with officers. Tyson fell unconscious and died while the officers were restraining him. They were charged with reckless homicide but pleaded guilty to the lesser charge of failing to report a crime.
9 April 2024	Beau Schoenegge	10 August 2026 (pleaded guilty)	Canton Police Department (Ohio)	Burch and Schoenegge handcuffed Frank Tyson, who had just gotten into a car accident, after he refused to comply with officers. Tyson fell unconscious and died while the officers were restraining him. They were charged with reckless homicide but pleaded guilty to the lesser charge of failing to report a crime.
9 April 2024	David Pearson	9 December 2024 (pleaded guilty)	Ohio Department of Rehabilitation and Correction (Ohio)	Pearson was a firearms instructor hosting a 40-hour training exercise. During the training, he instructed Lieutenant Rodney Osbourne in a "mirror drill", where he faced Osbourne, drew his pistol, and instructed Osbourne to follow him. During this exercise, Pearson fired his pistol, striking Osbourne in the chest. He pleaded guilty to negligent homicide.
12 October 2023	Grant Shaw	6 December 2024 (pleaded guilty)	Woodstock Police Department (Georgia)	Shaw and other officers chased Emmanuel Millard following a traffic stop. After police performed a PIT maneuver, Shaw shot and killed the unarmed Millard as he exited the car. He pleaded guilty to involuntary manslaughter and was sentenced to ten years probation and two years in prison.
3 October 2023	Felipe Hernandez	30 October 2025	Las Cruces Police Department (New Mexico)	Hernandez approached Teresa Gomez and a man who were sitting in a car outside a housing complex. After Hernandez spoke to the man about a previous trespassing case, Gomez reentered the car and began to drive away. Hernandez fired at the car from behind, striking Gomez. He was charged with second-degree murder but was convicted of voluntary manslaughter.
23 August 2023	Erik Duran	6 February 2026	New York City Police Department (New York)	Duran was part of a narcotics unit conducting an operation in the Bronx. After Eric Duprey sold drugs to an undercover officer, he fled on a scooter. Duran picked up a cooler and threw it at Duprey, causing him to lose control and crash into a tree. Duran was convicted of second-degree manslaughter.
8 April 2023	Mark Dial	22 May 2025	Philadelphia Police Department (Pennsylvania)	While responding to a call, Dial shot and killed Eddie Irizarry within seconds of arriving as Irizarry sat in his vehicle with a knife. Dial said he believed Irizarry had a gun. A jury acquitted him of murder but found him guilty of voluntary manslaughter and reckless endangerment.
3 May 2023	Erik Hernandez	27 January 2025 (pleaded guilty)	LaSalle Police Department (Colorado)	Responding to a suspicious vehicle call at a Family Dollar store, Hernandez shot and killed Juston Reffel as he drove away. A jury was unable to reach a unanimous verdict on murder, but Hernandez pleaded guilty to manslaughter.
7 January 2023	Desmond Mills	2 November 2023 (pleaded guilty)	Memphis Police Department (Tennessee)	Five officers beat Tyre Nichols during a traffic stop, leading to his hospitalization and death three days later. The five officers were charged with second-degree murder, aggravated kidnapping, and other charges in state court, and excessive force and obstruction of justice in federal court. One of those officers, Mills, initially pleaded not guilty to all charges but later changed his plea to guilty. Another officer, Martin pleaded guilty to excessive force and witness tampering in August 2024. Bean, Haley, and Smith were later convicted of witness tampering but acquitted of civil rights charges. Haley was found not guilty of violating Nichols' civil rights causing death, but found guilty of violating civil rights causing injury.
7 January 2023	Emmitt Martin	23 August 2024 (pleaded guilty)	Memphis Police Department (Tennessee)	
7 January 2023	Tadarrius Bean	3 October 2024	Memphis Police Department (Tennessee)	
7 January 2023	Demetrius Hale	3 October 2024	Memphis Police Department (Tennessee)	
7 January 2023	Justin Smith	3 October 2024	Memphis Police Department (Tennessee)	
31 October 2022	Benjamin Jillson	2 November 2023	Sacramento Police Department (California)	While responding to a felony in progress Jillson made a U-turn and struck motorcyclist Denzil Broadhurst. Jillson did not have his lights or sirens on at the time. He accepted a plea deal of voluntary manslaughter and was sentenced to 90 days in county jail, which is suspended pending 100 hours of community service.
10 October 2022	James "Jay" Keith Steward	13 August 2024 (pleaded guilty)	Tuscumbia Police Department (Alabama)	Police responded to reports of a crash where an on-duty officer, Steward, had struck pedestrian Terry Hinton. Steward was found to be under the influence and driving on the wrong side of the road. He was sentenced to 20 years in prison.
30 August 2022	Ricky Anderson	2 September 2026 (pleaded guilty)	Columbus Division of Police (Ohio)	Anderson and other officers served a warrant against Donovan Lewis for domestic violence, assault, and improper handling of a firearm. As Anderson entered Lewis's bedroom, Lewis sat up in bed, and Anderson shot him. Lewis was unarmed. Anderson was charged with murder but pleaded guilty to reckless homicide.
2 August 2022	Brad Lunsford	12 February 2025	Las Cruces Police Department (New Mexico)	Lunsford responded to a gas station where Presley Eze had been reported for stealing a beer. Eze and another officer got into a scuffle, and Lunsford shot Eze in the back. He was convicted of voluntary manslaughter.
10 June 2022	Kyle Alan Gould	16 November 2023 (pleaded guilty)	Clear Creek County Sheriff's Office (Colorado)	Officers from several different departments responded after 22-year-old Christian Glass called to report his vehicle got stuck. Glass showed signs of being in mental distress. At one point he asked if he could drop his geology tools out the window, but was told not to. Eventually, one deputy broke Glass's car window and shot him. Gould was not present at the scene, but was the supervisor of Buen, the deputy who fired. Gould was charged with failure to intervene and pleaded guilty in 2023. Buen faced second degree murder and reckless endangerment charges, and several other officers present at the scene were charged with failure to intervene. On April 26, 2024 Buen was convicted on reckless endangerment while the jury deadlocked on other charges. He was later convicted of negligent homicide.
10 June 2022	Andrew Buen	20 February 2025	Clear Creek County Sheriff's Office (Colorado)	
7 April 2022	Richard Daniel Johnson	25 April 2023	Richmond Police Department (Virginia)	Johnson and a trainee officer were responding to a backup call for a robbery. Johnson was driving 60 miles per hour (97 km/h) in a 35-mile-per-hour (56 km/h) zone when he drove through a red light and struck a vehicle, killing Jeremiah Ruffin and Tracey Williams. He was convicted of involuntary manslaughter.
1 March 2022	Edsaul Mendoza	19 April 2024 (pleaded guilty)	Philadelphia Police Department (Pennsylvania)	Mendoza and three other officers stopped 12-year-old Thomas Siderio and a 17-year-old. After a shot was fired into a police car, Siderio and the 17-year-old split up and ran, with Mendoza pursuing Siderio. Mendoza shot at Siderio three times as he fled. Siderio initially had a handgun, but he had dropped it after the first shot was fired. Mendoza fired the third and final shot at Siderio was 10 feet away and surrendering. Mendoza pleaded guilty to third-degree murder and possession of an instrument of crime in 2024.
26 February 2022	Isaac Hughes	11 June 2024	Jefferson Parish Sheriff's Office (Louisiana)	Hughes and another deputy confronted Daniel Vallee as he sat in a vehicle outside a drug house. When Vallee put his hands down and honked the car horn, the two deputies shot him. They were charged with manslaughter; Hughes was convicted of the lesser charge of negligent homicide, while the other deputy was acquitted. Hughes was sentenced to three years probation.
26 December 2021	Joshua Payne	6 December 2024 (pleaded guilty)	Titusville Police Department (Florida)	Payne attempted to arrest James Lowery, who Payne mistook for a domestic violence suspect. As Lowery fled, Payne fired his gun and Taser simultaneously, striking Lowery in the back of the head. He was sentenced to five years probation.
27 August 2021	Brian Devaney	10 November 2022 (pleaded guilty)	Sharon Hill Police Department (Pennsylvania)	Three officers were working as security at a high school football game when gunfire broke out. The officers fired at a vehicle they wrongly believed to be involved in the shooting, striking four people in a crowd leaving the game, including 8-year-old Fanta Bility. Ballistic testing could not determine which shot killed Bility. The three officers all pleaded guilty to ten counts of reckless endangerment in exchange for having manslaughter charges dropped.
27 August 2021	Sean Dolan	10 November 2022 (pleaded guilty)	Sharon Hill Police Department (Pennsylvania)	Three officers were working as security at a high school football game when gunfire broke out. The officers fired at a vehicle they wrongly believed to be involved in the shooting, striking four people in a crowd leaving the game, including 8-year-old Fanta Bility. Ballistic testing could not determine which shot killed Bility. The three officers all pleaded guilty to ten counts of reckless endangerment in exchange for having manslaughter charges dropped.
27 August 2021	Devon Smith	10 November 2022 (pleaded guilty)	Sharon Hill Police Department (Pennsylvania)	Three officers were working as security at a high school football game when gunfire broke out. The officers fired at a vehicle they wrongly believed to be involved in the shooting, striking four people in a crowd leaving the game, including 8-year-old Fanta Bility. Ballistic testing could not determine which shot killed Bility. The three officers all pleaded guilty to ten counts of reckless endangerment in exchange for having manslaughter charges dropped.
25 August 2021	Enis Jevric	23 February 2024 (pleaded guilty)	Metropolitan Police Department of the District of Columbia (District of Columbia)	Officers found 27-year-old An'Twan Gilmore sleeping in a car with a gun in his waistband. When an officer knocked on the window, the car moved several feet, then stopped, then moved again, at which point Jevric fired ten shots, hitting Gilmore three times. Jevric was charged with murder but accepted a plea deal for involuntary manslaughter.
27 July 2021	Cecil Morrison	30 March 2022 (pleaded no contest)	Hocking College Police Department (Ohio)	Morrison, an officer with Hocking College, responded to a domestic dispute call and shot Michael Whitmer as he attempted to drive away. Another officer was wounded by a ricocheted bullets, and Whitmer's child, in the backseat, was wounded by shattered glass. Morrison pleaded no contest to negligent homicide. Between the shooting and his arrest, Morrison was hired by the Nelsonville Police Department.
6 July 2021	Brian Cummings	27 April 2023 (pleaded guilty)	Minneapolis Police Department (Minnesota)	Cummings pursued an armed robbery suspect in a vehicular chase through a residential neighborhood. Driving upwards of 100 miles per hour (160 km/h), Cummings struck the vehicle of Leneal Frazier, an uninvolved motorist driving to his girlfriend's house, at 78 miles per hour (126 km/h). Cummings pleaded guilty to criminal vehicular homicide. Frazier was the uncle of Darnella Frazier, who filmed the murder of George Floyd by Minneapolis Police.
23 June 2021	Michael Davis	18 March 2022	Lonoke County Sheriff's Office (Arkansas)	During a traffic stop, Davis shot and killed Hunter Brittain as he went to grab a jug of antifreeze to prevent his truck from rolling into Davis's. Davis was found guilty of negligent homicide and sentenced to a year in prison.
11 April 2021	Kim Potter	23 December 2021	Brooklyn Center Police Department (Minnesota)	During a traffic stop, Potter attempted to arrest Daunte Wright for a warrant. She shot him, claiming that she meant to use her taser. She was found guilty of both first-degree and second-degree manslaughter and was sentenced to two years in prison.
14 March 2021	Remin Pineda	19 November 2024 (pleaded no contest)	Los Angeles County Sheriff's Department (California)	Pineda and several other deputies shot and killed David Ordaz Jr., who was armed with a knife and experiencing a mental health crisis. Pineda was charged with assault, as he continued to fire even after Ordaz was on the ground and disarmed. He pleaded no contest to his charges and was sentenced to probation.
5 January 2021	Patric J. Ferguson	7 August 2025 (pleaded guilty)	Memphis Police Department (Tennessee)	While on-duty, Ferguson used a police database to locate Robert Howard, who was dating Ferguson's ex-girlfriend. Ferguson then kidnapped Howard from the woman's home, killed him, and disposed of his body in a river with a friend, Joshua M. Rogers. He was sentenced to 38 years in prison for multiple federal charges. Rogers was convicted of obstruction.
22 December 2020	Christopher Baldner	13 March 2026	New York State Police (New York)	Baldner pulled over a man on the highway near Kingston. Following an argument, during which Baldner pepper-sprayed the driver, the man drove off. Baldner pursued, and eventually rammed the vehicle, causing it to crash, killing the driver's daughter, 11-year-old Monica Goods. Baldner was acquitted of murder but convicted of manslaughter.
22 December 2020	Adam Coy	4 November 2024	Columbus Division of Police (Ohio)	Coy responded to reports of a vehicle being turned on and off and shot unarmed Andre Hill as he exited a garage. Coy stated he believed Hill was a burglar, but he was actually a guest of the homeowner. Coy was convicted of murder in 2024. In 2025, he received a prison sentence of 15 years to life, in this case meaning he will serve a life sentence and not be eligible for parole for 15 years.
4 December 2020	Jason Meade	7 May 2026	Franklin County Sheriff's Office (Ohio)	Meade shot and killed Casey Goodson as he entered his grandmother's home holding Subway sandwiches. Meade said he pursued Goodson because he waved a gun as Meade drove past, but nobody else testified that they saw the gun, and prosecutors said it was in a holder under his belt with the safety turned on. Meade's first trial ended with a mistrial in 2024. In 2026, he was convicted of reckless homicide, though a mistrial was declared for the murder charge.
29 November 2020	Jonathan Wuneburger	8 December 2023 (pleaded guilty)	Galveston County Sheriff's Office (Texas)	Wuneburger shoved jail inmate Efrain Ledezma Perales after he attempted to leave his cell, causing him to hit his head on the floor and die. Wuneburger was charged with manslaughter but took a plea deal for negligent homicide and was sentenced to seven years probation.
22 November 2020	Rebecca Hillman	14 March 2023	New York City Department of Correction (New York)	At the Manhattan Detention Complex, jail Captain Hillman was on-duty when inmate Ryan Wilson attempted suicide. According to prosecutors Hillman hesitated to call for medical support and filled out non-essential paperwork instead of responding to Wilson, who died. Hillman was convicted of negligent homicide.
23 October 2020	Terence Sutton	22 December 2022	Metropolitan Police Department of the District of Columbia (District of Columbia)	Police pursued 20-year-old Karon Hylton-Brown for riding a moped without a helmet. After chasing Hylton-Brown through ten city blocks and an alley, he was struck by an oncoming vehicle as he exited the alley. Sutton was found guilty of second-degree-murder, conspiracy to obstruct justice, and obstruction of justice, while Zabavsky was found guilty of the latter two charges. In 2025, President Donald Trump pardoned both officers. Trump also falsely referred to Hylton-Brown as an illegal immigrant.
23 October 2020	Andrew Zabavsky	22 December 2022	Metropolitan Police Department of the District of Columbia (District of Columbia)	
5 September 2020	Benito Soto	26 June 2024 (pleaded no contest)	Fresno Police Department (California)	Soto was texting and driving when he struck and killed 51-year-old Jose Pulido, who was pushing a bicycle across a crosswalk. He was sentenced to one year of probation and 400 hours of community service.
25 May 2020	Derek Chauvin	20 April 2021 (state charges)	Minneapolis Police Department (Minnesota)	Chauvin knelt on the neck of George Floyd for about nine minutes while Floyd was handcuffed and lying face down on the street, calling out "I can't breathe" during an arrest made with three other officers, identified as Tou Thao, J. Alexander Keung, and Thomas Lane. In April 2021, Chauvin was found guilty of second-degree murder, third-degree murder, and second-degree manslaughter and was sentenced to 22 1/2 years in prison. Chauvin later pleaded guilty to the federal charge of deprivation of rights under color of law and was sentenced to a concurrent 21 years in prison. In May 2022, Lane, who held Floyd's legs down, pleaded guilty to aiding and abetting second-degree manslaughter in exchange for having his aiding and abetting second-degree murder charge dropped, and was sentenced to three years in prison. Later that year in October, Kueng, who also held Floyd down, pleaded guilty to one count of aiding and abetting in manslaughter shortly before he and Thao's trial was set to begin. He was later sentenced to 42 months (3 1/2 years) in prison with 82 days credit for time already served. Lastly, Thao was convicted of aiding and abetting manslaughter in a bench trial in May 2023. His conviction marked the final prosecution of officers for their involvement of Floyd's murder.
25 May 2020	Derek Chauvin	15 December 2021 (pleaded guilty) (federal charges)	Minneapolis Police Department (Minnesota)	
25 May 2020	Thomas Lane	18 May 2022 (pleaded guilty) (state charges)	Minneapolis Police Department (Minnesota)	
25 May 2020	Thomas Lane	24 February 2022 (federal charges)	Minneapolis Police Department (Minnesota)	
25 May 2020	J. Alexander Kueng	24 October 2022 (pleaded guilty) (state charges)	Minneapolis Police Department (Minnesota)	
25 May 2020	J. Alexander Kueng	24 February 2022 (federal charges)	Minneapolis Police Department (Minnesota)	
25 May 2020	Tou Thao	2 May 2023 (state charges)	Minneapolis Police Department (Minnesota)	
25 May 2020	Tou Thao	24 February 2022 (federal charges)	Minneapolis Police Department (Minnesota)	
1 May 2020	Aaron Russell	7 January 2022 (pleaded guilty)	San Diego County Sheriff's Department (California)	Russell fatally shot Nicholas Bils from behind after Bils escaped a state parks patrol car and ran away.
13 March 2020	Kelly Goodlett	23 August 2022 (pleaded guilty)	Louisville Metro Police Department (Kentucky)	Hankison and several other officers raided an apartment with a no-knock search warrant. When one of the occupants fired at them, police shot back, killing unarmed Breonna Taylor. Hankison was convicted on federal charges of using excessive force. Goodlett, who obtained the warrant, previously pleaded guilty to conspiracy to violate Taylor's civil rights. In 2025, Hankinson was sentenced to 33 months in prison, which will then be followed by 3 years of supervised release.
13 March 2020	Brett Hankison	1 November 2024	Louisville Metro Police Department (Kentucky)	Hankison and several other officers raided an apartment with a no-knock search warrant. When one of the occupants fired at them, police shot back, killing unarmed Breonna Taylor. Hankison was convicted on federal charges of using excessive force. Goodlett, who obtained the warrant, previously pleaded guilty to conspiracy to violate Taylor's civil rights. In 2025, Hankinson was sentenced to 33 months in prison, which will then be followed by 3 years of supervised release.
25 January 2020	Joel Streicher	8 January 2021 (pleaded guilty)	Milwaukee County Sheriff's Office (Wisconsin)	While on duty, Streicher drove through a red light and struck community activist Ceasar Stinson. Streicher pleaded guilty to homicide by negligent operation of a vehicle.
27 December 2019	Albin Pearson	1 September 2022	Newport News Police Department (Virginia)	Officers arrived at the home of Henry Berry for abusing the 911 system. Following a struggle, Pearson shot Berry in the back. A second officer was acquitted of manslaughter. Pearson was later sentenced to six years in prison.
3 December 2019	Eric J. DeValkenaere	20 November 2021	Kansas City Police Department (Missouri)	DeValkenaere shot Cameron Lamb, 26, in his own backyard after police responded to a report of a traffic incident involving Lamb's truck. Prosecutors argued DeValkenaere did not have a warrant or probable cause to be in Lamb's backyard at the time of the shooting and planted evidence at the scene.
12 October 2019	Aaron Dean	15 December 2022	Fort Worth Police Department (Texas)	Dean responded to a welfare call by a neighbor of Atatiana Jefferson, who reported that her front door was open. Dean walked into Jefferson's backyard, and after seeing her, he ordered her to put her hands up, then shot her. Jefferson had a legally owned gun, although prosecutors argued no evidence was found that Dean had seen it when he fired. Dean was found guilty of manslaughter.
24 August 2019	Randy Roedema	12 October 2023	Aurora Police Department (Colorado)	Police were called as Elijah McClain walked home wearing a black ski mask. Police restrained McClain, followed by paramedics administering ketamine, resulting in McClain's death. Three officers and two paramedics were charged with McClain's death in 2021. Roedema was found guilty, while a second officer was acquitted.
31 July 2019	Christopher Taylor	5 October 2024 (overturned)	Austin Police Department (Texas)	Police were called to a condominium to reports of a man later identified as Mauris DaSilva walking around with a knife to his neck. DaSilva was a resident of the condo. Police responded and were initially told he had gone back to his room, but later saw that he was on a communal floor with the knife to his neck. Officers took the elevator up and once the doors opened, DaSilva was standing right there with his back to the four officers with the knife to his neck. Police shouted various commands and as DaSilva turned around, moving toward officers, they shot him. A jury found Taylor guilty of deadly-conduct nearly five years later. Another officer was also charged. In 2025, charges against the other officer were dropped, and Taylor's conviction was overturned.
4 July 2019	Joshua Taylor	8 November 2021	Wilson Police Department (Oklahoma)	Taylor and Dingman tased 28-year-old Jared Lakey 53 times, resulting in his death.
4 July 2019	Brandon Dingman	8 November 2021	Wilson Police Department (Oklahoma)	Taylor and Dingman tased 28-year-old Jared Lakey 53 times, resulting in his death.
6 June 2019	Andrew Lyons	12 January 2024 (pleaded no contest)	Los Angeles County Sheriff's Department (California)	Lyons and another deputy responded to an apartment complex and approached a vehicle where Ryan Twyman was sitting. Both deputies opened fire after Twyman put the vehicle in reverse, but Lyons retrieved his semiautomatic assault rifle and fired at Twyman again, after the vehicle had stopped moving. Lyons pleaded no contest to one felony count each of assault with a semiautomatic firearm and assault under the color of authority in exchange for having his voluntary manslaughter charge dropped.
31 May 2019	Jeffrey Nelson	24 June 2024	Auburn Police Department (Washington)	Nelson responded to reports of a man causing damage at a convenience store and encountered Jesse Sarey, a Cambodian-American homeless man. Nelson punched Sarey seven times, pinned him against a wall, and shot him. He then reloaded his gun and shot Sarey in the forehead. The killing was Nelson's third in his career. He was convicted of second-degree murder and first-degree assault.
28 January 2019	Jovanny Crespo	5 July 2023	Newark Police Department (New Jersey)	During a traffic stop Crespo shot two men who drove away. Crespo jumped out of his moving patrol car three separate times to shoot, killing the driver, Gregory Griffin, and seriously injuring the passenger. Crespo stated he saw guns in the car, but other officers said they could not see inside the vehicle because of tinted windows.
28 January 2019	Gerald Goines	25 September 2024	Houston Police Department (Texas)	Goines lied in order to get a search warrant against Dennis Tuttle and Rhogena Nicholas, falsely portraying them as dangerous drug dealers. Police initiated a no-knock raid, shooting and killing one of the couple's dogs. In the ensuing shoot-out, both Tuttle and Nicholas were killed and five police officers were injured. Aside from a small amount of marijuana and cocaine, no drugs were found in the home.
24 January 2019	Nathaniel Hendren	28 February 2020 (pleaded guilty)	St. Louis Metropolitan Police Department (Missouri)	Hendren shot and killed fellow officer Katlyn Alix while playing a variation of Russian roulette, while he was supposed to be on duty. Hendren pleaded guilty and was sentenced to seven years in prison.
13 January 2019	Anthony Fox	4 August 2022	Jackson Police Department (Mississippi)	Fox and two other officers threw 62-year-old George Robinson out of his vehicle before striking and kicking him, leading to his death. Fox was convicted of culpable negligence manslaughter and sentenced to five years in prison, while the other two officers were cleared of murder charges. Fox’s conviction was overturned by the Mississippi Court of Appeals.
4 January 2019	Andria Heese	1 June 2021 (pleaded guilty)	Columbia Police Department (Missouri)	Prosecutors say Heese was parking her police cruiser to watch children board school buses at Battle High School when she struck 4-year-old Gabriella Curry. Heese pleaded guilty to careless and imprudent driving.
11 November 2018	Andrew Hall	26 October 2021	Danville Police Department (California)	Hall shot and killed 33-year-old Filipino-American Laudemer Arboleda as he slowly maneuvered his car between two police vehicles. Hall was convicted on assault with a firearm, but the jury deadlocked on charges of manslaughter.
18 September 2018	Stephen Flood	19 May 2022	Horry County Sheriff's Office (South Carolina)	In the aftermath of Hurricane Florence, Flood drove a police van past a National Guard barrier while transporting two women, Wendy Newton and Nicolette Green, to a mental health facility. The van was swept into a rail by floodwaters, making it impossible for the women to leave, and neither Flood nor another deputy had the key to a second door. Both of the women drowned. Flood was found guilty of two counts of involuntary manslaughter and reckless homicide each and sentenced to 18 years in prison. Charges against the second deputy were later dropped.
8 September 2018	James O'Brien	27 August 2021	Boulder County Sheriff's Office (Colorado)	O'Brien and Lunn picked up 23-year-old Demetrius Shankling and transported him in a police van to a detoxification center. When they arrived, the deputies found Shankling unresponsive and not breathing. An autopsy found that Shankling died from positional asphyxia due to how he was positioned in the van. O'Brien and Lunn were found guilty and sentenced to six and three years in prison, respectively.
8 September 2018	Adam Lunn	27 August 2021	Boulder County Sheriff's Office (Colorado)	O'Brien and Lunn picked up 23-year-old Demetrius Shankling and transported him in a police van to a detoxification center. When they arrived, the deputies found Shankling unresponsive and not breathing. An autopsy found that Shankling died from positional asphyxia due to how he was positioned in the van. O'Brien and Lunn were found guilty and sentenced to six and three years in prison, respectively.
1 September 2018	Bau Tran	1 June 2023 (pleaded guilty)	Arlington Police Department (Texas)	Tran pulled over the vehicle of O'Shae Terry. After officers told Terry and another man they were going to search the vehicle, Terry began to drive away. Tran grabbed the side of the vehicle and fired several shots, killing Terry. Tran pleaded guilty to criminally negligent homicide and was sentenced to six years deferred adjudication and a $600 fine.
26 July 2018	Andrew Delke	2 July 2021 (pleaded guilty)	Metropolitan Nashville Police Department (Tennessee)	Delke shot and killed 25-year-old Daniel Hambrick as he fled on foot.
3 April 2018	William Darby	7 May 2021 (overturned)	Huntsville Police Department (Alabama)	Darby was convicted of shooting and killing Jeffrey Parker, 49. Parker had been having suicidal ideations and was pointing a gun at his head when Darby entered his residence and shot him. His conviction was later overturned. He later pleaded guilty to manslaughter.
3 April 2018	William Darby	13 October 2023 (pleaded guilty)	Huntsville Police Department (Alabama)	Darby was convicted of shooting and killing Jeffrey Parker, 49. Parker had been having suicidal ideations and was pointing a gun at his head when Darby entered his residence and shot him. His conviction was later overturned. He later pleaded guilty to manslaughter.
27 December 2017	Eric Ruch	21 September 2022	Philadelphia Police Department (Pennsylvania)	Six seconds after arriving at a scene, Ruch shot and killed Dennis Plowden as he sat with one hand raised and the other in his pocket. Plowden did not have a weapon, but did have heroin in his pocket. Ruch was convicted of manslaughter.
24 December 2017	Mike Holmes	6 February 2020	Grundy County Sheriff's Office (Tennessee)	During a chase, Holmes shot at a car that drove by him, hitting Shelby Comer, who was a passenger.
15 November 2017	Keith Sweeney	4 November 2019	Oklahoma City Police Department (Oklahoma)	Sweeney shot and killed a suicidal man, Dustin Pigeon, whom investigators say was unarmed and posed no threat to police.
26 August 2017	Mark Bessner	16 April 2019	Michigan State Police (Michigan)	Bessner tased Damon Grimes as he rode on an ATV, causing him to crash into a truck and die from blunt-force trauma. Bessner stated he believed Grimes was reaching for a gun.
15 July 2017	Mohamed Noor	30 April 2019	Minneapolis Police Department (Minnesota)	While responding to a 911 call about a possible assault, Noor shot and killed Australian-American Justine Damond through the window of his patrol car after he was startled when Damond approached the vehicle.
8 July 2017	Phillip Barker	14 December 2022	Charlotte-Mecklenburg Police Department (North Carolina)	Barker was responding to a call driving at 100 miles per hour (160 km/h) when he struck James Short, a student at Central Piedmont Community College, who was walking in a crosswalk. A jury found Barker guilty of misdemeanor death by vehicle, but acquitted him of involuntary manslaughter.
29 April 2017	Roy Oliver	28 August 2018	Balch Springs Police Department (Texas)	Oliver fired three rounds from his rifle into a vehicle full of people leaving a party, killing 15-year-old Jordan Edwards.
22 October 2016	Andrew Bass	20 September 2018	Wetumpka Police Department (Alabama)	Bass drove at 97 miles per hour (156 km/h) without lights or siren, striking a car driven by Elaine Merritt. Bass was found guilty of criminally negligent homicide and sentenced to a year in jail.
9 August 2016	Lee Coel	16 October 2019 (pleaded guilty)	Punta Gorda Police Department (Florida)	During a role-playing scenario during a firearms safety demonstration, Coel accidentally shot and killed retired librarian Mary Knowlton. Coel was charged with manslaughter and initially pleaded not guilty, but later took a plea deal, taking a sentence of 10 years' probation.
4 March 2016	Bobby Joe Smith	15 March 2017	Laurel County Constable's Office (Kentucky)	Smith shot and killed Brandon Stanley as he raised his arms. Smith said he believed Stanley had something in his hands when he raised them.
3 March 2016	Jesse Santifort	6 October 2020 (pleaded guilty)	Kenly Police Department (North Carolina)	Following a chase, Santifort tased Alex Thompson multiple times, resulting in his death. Santifort was indicted on involuntary manslaughter, but pleaded guilty to the lesser charge of assault.
25 February 2016	Aaron Cody Smith	22 November 2019	Montgomery Police Department (Alabama)	Smith shot 58-year-old Greg Gunn seven times, killing him, after Gunn fled a stop-and-frisk search. Smith claimed that Gunn had attacked him with a pole, a claim prosecutors disproved during the trial.
28 December 2015	Guarionex Candelario Rivera	21 November 2016	Puerto Rico Police Department (Puerto Rico)	While on duty, Candelario Rivera shot Commander Frank Román Rodríguez, Lieutenant Luz M. Soto Segarra, and Agent Rosario Hernández de Hoyos, all of whom were also members of the Puerto Rico Police Department. Candelario Rivera was sentenced to more than 200 years in prison.
25 November 2015	Patrick Feaster	18 October 2016	Paradise Police Department (California)	Feaster responded to a drunk-driving crash that killed a woman. As the driver, Andrew Thomas, exited the car, Feaster shot him in the neck. Thomas died of his injuries in December 2015.
3 November 2015	Derrick Stafford	31 March 2017	Marksville Marshal's Department (Louisiana)	Stafford and Greenhouse fired 18 rounds into the car of Christopher Few after a brief road chase, resulting in the death of Few's six-year-old son, Jeremy Mardis, who was sitting in the backseat.
3 November 2015	Norris Greenhouse Jr.	29 September 2017 (pleaded guilty)	Marksville Marshal's Department (Louisiana)	Stafford and Greenhouse fired 18 rounds into the car of Christopher Few after a brief road chase, resulting in the death of Few's six-year-old son, Jeremy Mardis, who was sitting in the backseat.
18 October 2015	Nouman K. Raja	7 March 2019	Palm Beach Gardens Police Department (Florida)	While on duty as a plainclothes officer, Raja shot and killed 31-year-old Corey Jones as he awaited a tow truck for his broken-down vehicle on a highway exit ramp. Raja claimed that he was investigating an abandoned vehicle when Jones confronted him, armed.
26 September 2015	Anthony Scott	27 August 2025	Georgia State Patrol (Georgia)	State Trooper Scott was speeding and not responding to a call when he struck another vehicle near Bremen, killing 17-year-old Kylie Lindsey and 16-year-old Isabella Chincilla. An initial trial ended in a mistrial, but he was later found guilty of five out of six charges, including one count of second-degree homicide by vehicle. At the time of his conviction, Scott was mayor of Buchanan.
22 April 2015	Stephen Rankin	4 August 2016	Portsmouth Police Department (Virginia)	Rankin shot and killed William Chapman in the face and chest during a fight after he was accused of shoplifting. Rankin was found guilty of manslaughter, but not guilty of murder.
4 April 2015	Michael Slager	2 May 2017 (pleaded guilty)	North Charleston Police Department (South Carolina)	Slager fatally shot 50-year-old Walter Scott in the back as he fled after being stopped for an inoperative brake light. Slager then dropped his Taser by Scott's lifeless body.
2 April 2015	Robert Charles Bates	28 April 2016	Tulsa County Sheriff's Office (Oklahoma)	Bates, a reserve deputy, shot Eric Harris after mistaking his taser with his revolver.
9 March 2015	Robert Olsen	14 October 2019 (overturned)	DeKalb County Police Department (Georgia)	Olsen shot and killed Anthony Hill, who was naked and unarmed. Olsen was found guilty of one count of aggravated assault, two counts of violating his oath of office, and one count of making a false statement, and found not guilty of felony murder. In 2024 his conviction was overturned. He later pleaded guilty to assault and was released on time served.
9 March 2015	Robert Olsen	28 May 2025 (pleaded guilty)	DeKalb County Police Department (Georgia)	Olsen shot and killed Anthony Hill, who was naked and unarmed. Olsen was found guilty of one count of aggravated assault, two counts of violating his oath of office, and one count of making a false statement, and found not guilty of felony murder. In 2024 his conviction was overturned. He later pleaded guilty to assault and was released on time served.
1 January 2015	Jason Kenny	16 October 2015	Chatham County Sheriff's Office (Georgia)	Kenny and eight other deputies were fired after Nigerian student Mathew Ajibade was tased and beaten, later dying from his injuries. Kenny, a second deputy, and a nurse were all acquitted of manslaughter charges, but Kenny was found guilty of cruelty to an inmate.
20 November 2014	Peter Liang	11 February 2016	New York City Police Department (New York)	Liang was patrolling a stairwell in a public-housing development in Brooklyn when he fired one round at 28-year-old Akai Gurley, killing him. Liang claimed that he was startled and had fired accidentally.
20 October 2014	Jason Van Dyke	5 October 2018	Chicago Police Department (Illinois)	Van Dyke shot and killed 17-year-old Laquan McDonald after officers stopped him while carrying a knife in the middle of the street. Dashcam video released later showed that McDonald was walking away when Van Dyke opened fire.
12 October 2014	James Ashby	23 June 2016	Rocky Ford Police Department (Colorado)	While on duty, Ashby followed 27-year-old Jack Jacquez into his mother's home and shot him in the back. Ashby claimed he thought Jacquez was a burglar.
31 May 2014	Anthony Piercy	27 June 2017 (pleaded guilty)	Missouri State Highway Patrol (Missouri)	Piercy arrested Brandon Ellingson on the Lake of the Ozarks on suspicion of operating a boat while intoxicated. Ellingson fell from the boat and his improperly secured life vest came off, causing him to drown as he was still handcuffed. Piercy was charged with negligent manslaughter, but pleaded guilty to negligent operation of a vessel.
12 May 2014	Steven Homanko	20 September 2016 (pleaded guilty)	Nesquehoning Police Department (Pennsylvania)	Homanko attempted to pull over a woman who had illegally passed another vehicle, when he lost control of his vehicle and crashed into another vehicle, killing Carola Sauers. Homanko was sentenced to three to 23 months in jail.
11 April 2014	Marcus Eberhart	16 December 2016	East Point Police Department (Georgia)	Eberhart and Weems repeatedly tasered Gregory Towns while he was handcuffed. Eberhart was convicted on all counts and sentenced to life in prison, while Weems was found guilty of involuntary manslaughter, reckless conduct, and violation of oath of office, and sentenced to five years in prison.
11 April 2014	Howard Weems	16 December 2016	East Point Police Department (Georgia)	Eberhart and Weems repeatedly tasered Gregory Towns while he was handcuffed. Eberhart was convicted on all counts and sentenced to life in prison, while Weems was found guilty of involuntary manslaughter, reckless conduct, and violation of oath of office, and sentenced to five years in prison.
9 February 2014	Justin Craven	4 April 2016 (pleaded guilty)	North Augusta Police Department (South Carolina)	Craven shot and killed Ernest Satterwhite after a slow-speed chase ended with Satterwhite pulling into his own driveway. A lawyer for Satterwhite's family stated that video showed Craven lunge into the car with his gun drawn, before pulling back and firing.
12 January 2014	Jonathan DePrenda	6 August 2015 (pleaded guilty)	Williamsport Police Department (Pennsylvania)	While responding to a call, DePrenda's cruiser struck the vehicle of James David Robinson travelling 88 miles per hour (142 km/h). As part of a plea deal, DePrenda also pleaded guilty to reckless endangerment of another person, failure to drive at a safe speed, careless driving resulting in unintentional death, and reckless driving in exchange for having vehicular manslaughter charges dropped.
29 August 2013	Adam D. Torres	24 June 2016	Fairfax County Police Department (Virginia)	Torres shot and killed John Geer as he raised his hands unarmed. Torres was sentenced to a year in prison and released after five days due to 10 months already served.
31 July 2013	Jason Blackwelder	10 June 2014	Conroe Police Department (Texas)	Blackwelder shot Russell Rios, who had shoplifted two iPod cases, in the back of the head while chasing after him. He was found guilty of second-degree manslaughter.
7 July 2013	William McKinney	6 November 2014	Buckner Police Department (Illinois)	While responding to a dispute, McKinney struck 62-year-old Roy Barnhart in the head. Barnhart was treated for a head injury and brain bleed, but died a few days later. McKinney took a plea deal for official misconduct.
14 March 2012	Randy Trent Harrison	26 November 2013	Del City Police Department (Oklahoma)	Captain Harrison shot 18-year-old Dane Scott Jr. in the back as he ran away after Harrison disarmed him.
7 March 2012	Joshua Colclough	16 August 2013 (pleaded guilty)	New Orleans Police Department (Louisiana)	Colclough was executing a drug raid when he fired a single round, killing Wendell Allen as he was unarmed and shirtless.
9 February 2012	Daniel Harmon Wright	29 January 2013	Culpeper Police Department (Virginia)	Wright shot and killed Patricia Cook, 54, in her own vehicle as he was investigating reports of a suspicious vehicle. Wright had claimed that Cook had rolled her window up, trapping his arm, and began to drive away, but this was discredited by witness statements and the fact that Cook's vehicle had manual roll-up windows.
16 December 2011	John Swearengin	14 August 2014 (pleaded no contest)	Kern County Sheriff's Office (California)	While responding to a call, Swearengin struck two pedestrians, Daniel Hiler and Crystal Jolley. Swearengin pleaded no contest to one count of misdemeanor vehicular manslaughter.
30 August 2011	Kenneth Bluew	12 October 2012	Buena Vista Township Police Department (Michigan)	While on duty, Bluew strangled his pregnant girlfriend, Jennifer Webb, to death. Bluew was convicted of first-degree murder, assault causing a miscarriage, and having a firearm in a felony, and was given the mandatory sentence of life in prison without parole.
14 July 2011	Teddie Whitefield	20 January 2015	Wichita Falls Police Department (Texas)	Whitefield's patrol car struck a vehicle, killing 18-year-old Yeni Lopez, 13-year-old Gloria Montoya, and Lopez's unborn child. Prosecutors say Whitefield was traveling at 75 miles per hour (121 km/h) before the crash and that he had prescription drugs in his system.
2 May 2011	Richard Combs	1 September 2015 (pleaded guilty)	Eutawville Police Department (South Carolina)	Combs, the police chief and only officer in Eutawville, shot and killed Walter Bailey after Bailey came to town hall to dispute his daughter's speeding ticket. Combs pleaded guilty to misconduct in office in exchange for having his murder charges dropped.
19 February 2011	Kristina Hambie	5 February 2015 (pleaded guilty)	DeKalb County Police Department (Georgia)	Despite not responding to a call, Hambie was driving 74 miles per hour (119 km/h) in a 35-mile-per-hour (56 km/h) zone, when her cruiser struck another vehicle, killing Shelley Amos and Cheryl Burton. Hambie pleaded guilty to reckless driving, violation of oath by a police officer, and two counts of vehicular homicide.
5 October 2010	Richard Chrisman	16 September 2013	Phoenix Police Department (Arizona)	Chrisman was responding to a report of a domestic dispute in a mobile-home park when he shot and killed 29-year-old Daniel Rodriguez and his dog at point-blank range. A fellow officer testified that Rodriguez posed no threat and was intent on leaving when Chrisman shot and killed him.
22 September 2010	Abimalet Natal Rivera	2012	Puerto Rico Police Department (Puerto Rico)	While investigating an armed robbery at a Burger King in Guaynabo, Natal Rivera shot José Alberto Vega Jorge, a karate student who was helping other agents find the robber. He was sentenced to eight years of probation.
31 July 2010	Brandon Shane Mundy	25 February 2013 (pleaded guilty)	North Courtland Police Department (Alabama)	Mundy's police car struck another vehicle after he ran a stop sign, killing Gary Wayne Cox and Sandra Standridge Cox. Mundy pleaded guilty to two counts of criminally negligent homicide before his trial began.
25 July 2010	Derek Folston	3 May 2011	Norfolk Police Department (Virginia)	Folstom struck bicyclist Donnell Worsley while responding to a nonemergency call. Folston accepted a plea deal and was convicted of reckless driving.
28 March 2010	Brian Massa	1 December 2011	Southwest City Police Department (Missouri)	Massa fired four shots at Bobby Stacy's vehicle after it had passed him. Massa was convicted of involuntary manslaughter.
20 March 2010	Andrew Ringeisen	20 May 2011 (pleaded guilty)	Overland Police Department (Missouri)	Ringeisen shoved 49-year-old Kenneth Hamilton down an interior staircase at Hamilton's home, causing fatal head injuries. Ringeisen pleaded guilty to involuntary manslaughter.
20 January 2010	Coleman Brackney	2 December 2010 (pleaded guilty)	Bella Vista Police Department (Arkansas)	Following a chase, Brackney fired at James Ahern six times, the first five as the vehicle was moving and the last after it had stopped. Brackney was sentenced to 30 days in jail. He was later appointed police chief of Sulphur Springs.
30 November 2009	Reginald Jones	August 2010	Metropolitan Police Department of the District of Columbia (District of Columbia)	Jones was on duty while acting as a lookout during a drug robbery that resulted in the murder of Arvel Alston, 40, and the shooting of one other person.
24 July 2009	Steven Merchant	1 March 2012 (pleaded guilty)	Colfax Police Department (Louisiana)	Merchant shot and killed 54-year-old Harold Phillips from behind.
13 June 2009	Jason Anderson	4 May 2016 (pleaded no contest)	Milford Police Department (Connecticut)	Anderson was responding to a call without his sirens on, when his cruiser struck the vehicle in front of him, killing David Servin and Ashlie Krakowski. Anderson pleaded no contest to misconduct with a motor vehicle, criminally negligent homicide, and reckless driving, and was sentenced to one year in prison.
22 February 2009	Paul Carrier	1 December 2010	Humboldt Police Department (Tennessee)	After a traffic stop, Carrier shot Roy Glenn Jr. once in the back after Glenn fell on his hands and knees facing towards Carrier. Carrier was found guilty of reckless homicide.
1 January 2009	Johannes Mehserle	8 July 2010	Bay Area Rapid Transit Police Department (California)	Mehserle shot and killed 22-year-old Oscar Grant after an altercation on a train platform. Grant was on the ground and restrained when Mehserle drew his service weapon and fired one round into Grant's back, fatally injuring him. Mehserle claimed that he believed Grant was reaching for a weapon in his waistband.
3 March 2008	James Council	7 May 2009 (pleaded guilty)	Santa Clara County Sheriff's Office (California)	Council fell asleep at the wheel while in his patrol car, and killed cyclists Matt Peterson and Kristy Gough. He was sentenced to four months of house arrest and 20 weeks of community service.
23 November 2007	Matt Mitchell	April 2010 (pleaded guilty)	Illinois State Police (Illinois)	While responding to a crash near O'Fallon, Mitchell's vehicle crossed the median and struck another car, killing 18-year-old Jessica Uhl and her 13-year-old sister Kelli Uhl. Mitchell was writing an email on his computer and making a phone call before the crash.
11 August 2007	Javier Pagán Cruz	2008	Puerto Rico Police Department (Puerto Rico)	Police restrained Miguel Cáceres during a traffic stop after he insulted a police officer. While restrained, Pagán Cruz shot him several times. He was convicted of murder and sentenced to 109 years in prison.
3 August 2007	Robert Shawn Richardson	March 2008 (pleaded no contest)	Noble Police Department (Oklahoma)	Rogers shot 5-year-old Austin Haley while shooting at a snake in a birdhouse. Rogers and Richardson, his supervisor, pleaded no contest to second-degree manslaughter. Rogers's record was later expunged.
3 August 2007	Paul Bradley Rogers	March 2008 (pleaded no contest)	Noble Police Department (Oklahoma)	Rogers shot 5-year-old Austin Haley while shooting at a snake in a birdhouse. Rogers and Richardson, his supervisor, pleaded no contest to second-degree manslaughter. Rogers's record was later expunged.
30 May 2007	Antonio Taharka	11 March 2009 (pleaded guilty)	Savannah-Chatham Metropolitan Police Department (Georgia)	Taharka shot and killed Anthony Smashum as he attempted to climb a fence while fleeing. Smashum was shot twice, once in the leg and once in the back. Taharka pleaded guilty to involuntary manslaughter.
7 February 2007	Joseph Corbett	15 January 2009 (pleaded guilty)	Taylorsville Police Department (Utah)	Corbett responded to reports of a chase by preparing to set up spike strips. While at an intersection, Corbett crashed into the vehicle of John Douglas, killing him. Corbett pleaded guilty to speeding, failure to stop, and improper lookout.
20 January 2007	Stuart Merry	20 August 2009	Beverly Police Department (Massachusetts)	Merry was found guilty of negligent homicide for a crash that killed Bonney Burns. Merry's attorney claimed he suffered a seizure before the crash, although prosecutors disputed this. Merry was sentenced to three years of probation, 200 hours of community service, a $1,000 fine, and the loss of his driver's license for 15 years.
21 November 2006	Greg Junnier	24 February 2009 (pleaded guilty)	Atlanta Police Department (Georgia)	While executing a drug raid based on faulty information from an informant, plainclothes officers shot and killed 92-year-old Kathryn Johnston and later planted marijuana in her home.
21 November 2006	Jason Smith	24 February 2009 (pleaded guilty)	Atlanta Police Department (Georgia)	While executing a drug raid based on faulty information from an informant, plainclothes officers shot and killed 92-year-old Kathryn Johnston and later planted marijuana in her home.
21 November 2006	Arthur Telser	24 February 2009 (pleaded guilty)	Atlanta Police Department (Georgia)	While executing a drug raid based on faulty information from an informant, plainclothes officers shot and killed 92-year-old Kathryn Johnston and later planted marijuana in her home.
18 March 2006	Karl Thompson	1 November 2011	Spokane Police Department (Washington)	Thompson repeatedly struck Otto Zehm with a baton after he was accused of stealing money from an ATM. Zehm died two days later and his death was ruled a homicide. Thompson was convicted of excessive force and lying to investigators.
7 March 2006	Larry P. Norman	28 June 2007	Arkansas State Police (Arkansas)	Trooper Larry P. Norman shot Joseph Erin Hamley, a man with cerebral palsy, as he lay on his back after Hamley was mistaken for a fugitive. The trooper pleaded guilty to negligent homicide.
19 February 2006	Joshua Corcran	8 June 2006 (pleaded guilty)	Nevada State Police (Nevada)	Corcran struck a Cadillac while driving south of Las Vegas, killing Victor De La Cruz-De Leon, Reymunda Lopez-Vazquez, Jose Sanchez Lopez, and Jose Roberto Mejia Lang, as well as injuring a pregnant teenager, who was the sister of De La Cruz-De Leon and Lopez-Vazquez, a relative of Sanchez Lopez, and a family friend of Mejia Lang. Corcran pleaded guilty to five counts of reckless driving.
22 December 2005	Matthew J. Hinkel	1 May 2007 (pleaded no contest)	Coopersburg Borough Police Department (Pennsylvania)	While responding to a nonemergency call, Hinkel sped 40 miles per hour (64 km/h) over the speed limit and collided with the vehicle of Shirley Tuomela, killing her. Tuomela's son and an officer in Hinkel's vehicle were injured in the crash. Hinkel pleaded no contest to involuntary manslaughter.
14 October 2005	Brandon Tagayun	March 2007 (pleaded guilty)	Charleston Police Department (West Virginia)	While responding to a call, Tagayun's cruiser clipped a pick-up truck, killing the driver, Patsy Sizemore. Tagayun accepted a plea deal and pleaded guilty to speeding and failure to operate an emergency vehicle with lights and sirens.
4 September 2005	Kenneth Bowen	5 August 2011	New Orleans Police Department (Louisiana)	Further information: Danziger Bridge shootings Four NOPD officers not in uniform at the time opened fire on a family on the Danziger Bridge, killing 17-year-old James Brissette and 40-year-old Ronald Madison and wounding four others. The officers claimed that they had been fired upon when they responded to a call about an officer under fire.
4 September 2005	Robert Faulcon Jr.	5 August 2011	New Orleans Police Department (Louisiana)	Further information: Danziger Bridge shootings Four NOPD officers not in uniform at the time opened fire on a family on the Danziger Bridge, killing 17-year-old James Brissette and 40-year-old Ronald Madison and wounding four others. The officers claimed that they had been fired upon when they responded to a call about an officer under fire.
4 September 2005	Robert Gisevius Jr.	5 August 2011	New Orleans Police Department (Louisiana)	Further information: Danziger Bridge shootings Four NOPD officers not in uniform at the time opened fire on a family on the Danziger Bridge, killing 17-year-old James Brissette and 40-year-old Ronald Madison and wounding four others. The officers claimed that they had been fired upon when they responded to a call about an officer under fire.
4 September 2005	Anthony Villavaso II	5 August 2011	New Orleans Police Department (Louisiana)	Further information: Danziger Bridge shootings Four NOPD officers not in uniform at the time opened fire on a family on the Danziger Bridge, killing 17-year-old James Brissette and 40-year-old Ronald Madison and wounding four others. The officers claimed that they had been fired upon when they responded to a call about an officer under fire.
2 September 2005	David Warren	10 December 2010 (overturned)	New Orleans Police Department (Louisiana)	31-year-old Henry Glover was shot with a .223 rifle by NOPD officer David Warren from a second-story balcony. Glover had been retrieving loot at the time.
30 July 2005	Melvin Williams	13 April 2011	New Orleans Police Department (Louisiana)	Williams kicked and beat Raymond Robair with a baton. A federal jury convicted Williams of violating Robair's constitutional rights by kicking and beating him. In addition, Williams' partner was found guilty of lying to investigators.
18 December 2004	Billy Anders	4 March 2006 (pleaded guilty)	Otero County Sheriff's Office (New Mexico)	Anders and his partner Bob Hedman responded to reports of shots fired after white supremacist Earl Flippen killed his girlfriend. After Hedman and Anders split up, a shootout between Anders and Flippen ended with Anders shooting and handcuffing Flippen. Afterwards, Anders went to the back of Flippen's house and discovered he had killed Hedman. Anders then returned to the front of the house and shot Flippen, still handcuffed, in the chest. Anders accepted a plea deal of voluntary manslaughter.
21 November 2003	Arthur Carbonneau	19 January 2005	Houston Police Department (Texas)	While responding to reports that a boy had been assaulted by a teenager, Carbonneau and another officer entered an apartment without permission and lined up three teenagers, including Eli Eloy Escobar II, for identification. When Escobar, who was not involved in the earlier incident, tried to leave, officers attempted to handcuff him, and in the struggle, Carbonneau shot him. He was sentenced to 60 days in prison for negligent homicide.
20 July 2003	Elias Perocier Morales	June 2009	San Juan Police Department (Puerto Rico)	Officers beat Jose Antonio Rivera Robles during an arrest at a gas station, resulting in his death. Two officers were sentenced to 10 and 6.5 years in prison, respectively.
20 July 2003	Eliezer Rivera Gonzalez	June 2009	San Juan Police Department (Puerto Rico)	Officers beat Jose Antonio Rivera Robles during an arrest at a gas station, resulting in his death. Two officers were sentenced to 10 and 6.5 years in prison, respectively.
20 July 2003	Aaron Vidal Maldonado	14 August 2009	San Juan Police Department (Puerto Rico)	Officers beat Jose Antonio Rivera Robles during an arrest at a gas station, resulting in his death. Two officers were sentenced to 10 and 6.5 years in prison, respectively.
20 July 2003	Juan Morales Rosales	14 August 2009	San Juan Police Department (Puerto Rico)	Officers beat Jose Antonio Rivera Robles during an arrest at a gas station, resulting in his death. Two officers were sentenced to 10 and 6.5 years in prison, respectively.
20 July 2003	Carlos Pagan Ferrer	14 August 2009	San Juan Police Department (Puerto Rico)	Officers beat Jose Antonio Rivera Robles during an arrest at a gas station, resulting in his death. Two officers were sentenced to 10 and 6.5 years in prison, respectively.
22 May 2003	Brian Conroy	22 October 2005	New York City Police Department (New York)	Plainclothes officer Brian Conroy shot and killed Burkinabé immigrant Ousmane Zongo during a raid on a warehouse. Zongo was unarmed and running away from police when Conroy opened fire.
1 February 2002	Dan Riter	3 July 2003	Riverside County District Attorney's Office (California)	Riter, an investigator with the Riverside County district attorney's office, was attempting to detain a woman whose children had been declared wards of the court. Riter stuck his hand into a moving truck and fired, killing Jesus Pena "Jesse" Herrera, who was giving the family a ride. He was convicted of involuntary manslaughter and sentenced to seven years in prison.
27 December 2001	Joseph Warzycha	14 January 2003 (pleaded no contest)	East Providence Police Department (Rhode Island)	During a training exercise in a school bus lot, Warzycha, the department's sniper, brought his personal rifle to the scene. Thinking it was unloaded, he pointed it at his supervisor Alister McGregor and shot him. Warzycha pleaded no contest to involuntary manslaughter.
29 December 1998	Scott Byron Smith	9 March 2000	New Milford Police Department (Connecticut)	Smith shot and killed Franklyn Reid, who was unarmed, but had a folding knife in the front pocket of his jacket. After his conviction, he was granted an appeal and retrial before which he agreed to a plea deal.
24 December 1998	Scott Charles Cameron	4 November 1999 (pleaded guilty)	Easton Police Department (Pennsylvania)	Cameron shot and killed John E. Rapp in the back of the head at a park in Palmer Township. Cameron pleaded guilty to involuntary manslaughter in exchange for having his voluntary manslaughter charges dropped.
16 June 1998	William Scribner	19 April 2000	New Milford Police Department (Connecticut)	While responding to a call, Scribner struck another vehicle, killing Angela D'Aquila. Scribner was convicted of negligent manslaughter. His conviction came a few months after another New Milford officer was convicted of a separate killing.
14 February 1998	Joseph Mantelli	1999	Las Vegas Police Department (New Mexico)	Mantelli shot and killed Abelino Montoya after a chase as he drove away.
10 August 1996	Mathias Bachmeier	13 June 1997	King County Sheriff's Office (Washington)	While on duty, Bachmeier picked up 35-year-old James Wren and killed him, intending to frame him for a fire Bachmeier set at his own home as part of an insurance scam. Bachmeier was sentenced to life in prison without parole.
4 July 1996	Paolo Colecchia	30 May 1997	New York City Transit Police (New York)	Officer Colecchia shot and killed Nathaniel Levi Gaines on a subway station platform after an altercation. Colecchia shot Gaines multiple times in the back and later admitted he was not in fear of his life when he did so. Colecchia sentenced to 5 to 15 years in prison.
6 April 1995	John Charmo	11 October 2001 (pleaded guilty)	Pittsburgh Housing Authority Police Department (Pennsylvania)	During a chase for wrong-way driving on a one-way street, police pursued Jerry Jackson to a tunnel, where Charmo and other officers shot at him at least 51 times. After a mistrial, a plea deal was reached for involuntary manslaughter, and Charmo was sentenced to 11 1/2 months in jail.
28 January 1995	Charles Forbes	1997	Birmingham Police Department (Alabama)	Forbes saw a group of people near a van and assumed it was a drug deal. After telling the men to leave, one man, Dan Davis, argued with Forbes. The two got into a fight and Forbes shot Davis three times. Forbes was charged with murder but convicted of manslaughter and sentenced to ten years in prison. He was released in 2000.
5 November 1992	Walter Budzyn	23 August 1993	Detroit Police Department (Michigan)	While in plain clothes, Nevers struck Malice Green in the head with a flashlight after the officers noticed Green outside a known drug den. Nevers was sentenced to 12 to 25 years in prison, while Budzyn was sentenced to 8 to 18 years. Charges against a third officer were dropped.
5 November 1992	Larry Nevers	23 August 1993	Detroit Police Department (Michigan)	While in plain clothes, Nevers struck Malice Green in the head with a flashlight after the officers noticed Green outside a known drug den. Nevers was sentenced to 12 to 25 years in prison, while Budzyn was sentenced to 8 to 18 years. Charges against a third officer were dropped.
25 August 1992	Joseph Kent McGowen	1994 (overturned)	Harris County Sheriff's Office (Texas)	McGowen obtained a fake arrest warrant for Susan Diane Harrison White after she complained about him. McGowen went to White's home and shot her, later claiming White pointed a pistol at him. McGowen's first conviction was overturned as his attorney was not allowed to make an opening statement, but he was convicted again in 2002.
25 August 1992	Joseph Kent McGowen	29 March 2002	Harris County Sheriff's Office (Texas)	McGowen obtained a fake arrest warrant for Susan Diane Harrison White after she complained about him. McGowen went to White's home and shot her, later claiming White pointed a pistol at him. McGowen's first conviction was overturned as his attorney was not allowed to make an opening statement, but he was convicted again in 2002.
3 March 1992	Jonas Bright	23 April 1995	New York City Housing Authority Police Department (New York)	Bright shot and killed Douglas Oralfy at a traffic light. Bright maintained that he accidentally shot Oralfy when the car jerked backwards, but Oralfy's passenger disputed this.
27 January 1992	Jeffrey Hodge	May 1993 (pleaded guilty)	University of Toledo Police Department (Ohio)	While on-duty, Hodge pulled over University of Toledo student Melissa Herstrum before handcuffing and kidnapping her. He took Herstrum to the university's Scott Park campus, where he shot her 14 times. The next day he placed a 911 call and responded to the call along with other officers. He was arrested a week later after a detective noticed marks on his handcuffs caused by the gunshots. He pleaded guilty to Herstrum's murder in 1993.
30 December 1991	John McDonald	5 June 1992	Cairo Police Department (Illinois)	McDonald stopped 25-year-old Roy Lee Jones to question him about a robbery. When Jones refused to answer questions and tried to leave, the two scuffled and McDonald fired 13 shots at Jones, all of which missed. He then fired a 14th shot, killing Jones. McDonald claimed his supervisor told him to fire the last shot, but the supervisor disputed this. McDonald was convicted of second-degree murder and aggravated battery and sentenced to 10 years in prison.
12 July 1991	James E. "Sonny" Hall	5 October 1992	Boston Police Department (Massachusetts)	Hall shot and killed 16-year-old Christopher Rogers as he hid under a truck outside his home in Dorchester. Although he was on duty, Hall was outside his assigned district. Hall, who claimed he fired accidentally when he lost his balance, was convicted of manslaughter and sentenced to five and a half to ten years in prison.
16 January 1989	William Lozano	7 December 1989 (overturned)	Miami Police Department (Florida)	Lozano shot and killed 23-year-old Clement Lloyd as he fled police in his vehicle. Allan Blanchard, 24, was killed in the resulting crash. Lozano later claimed that Lloyd was attempting to run him over.
11 May 1987	James Aren Duckett	10 May 1988	Mascotte Police Department (Florida)	Duckett met 11 year-old Teresa McAbee at a convenience store, and then drove her to a nearby lake where he sexually assaulted and then murdered her. He was convicted on circumstantial evidence and sentenced to death, although made numerous appeals. Duckett was executed on July 28, 2026.
27 December 1986	Craig Peyer	June 1988	California Highway Patrol (California)	While on duty, Peyer strangled Cara Knott near a highway off-ramp near Interstate 15 in San Diego County. He was sentenced to 25 years in prison.
16 September 1986	John Mueller	Unknown	Sauk-Prairie Police Department (Wisconsin)	Mueller, who had been hired despite a previously diagnosed mental illness, shot John Graham in the back of the head, killing him, during a marijuana arrest. Mueller was charged with first-degree murder and sentenced to life in a mental institution.
4 March 1983	Robert Koenig	17 September 1983	Metro-Dade Police Department (Florida)	Koenig shot Donald Harp after he was involved in a car crash. Koenig claimed he thought Harp was reaching for a gun, but a medical examiner stated Harp was near unconscious when he was shot. Koenig was convicted of manslaughter and sentenced to seven years in prison.
15 April 1982	Robert Armstrong	1984	Los Angeles County Sheriff's Department (California)	Armstrong and other deputies called a false disturbance complaint to the home of Delois Young, which they believed was part of a PCP operation. When Young, eight months' pregnant, opened her door holding a shotgun, Armstrong shot her, killing her unborn fetus and wounding Young. Armstrong stated he identified himself as a deputy and ordered Young to drop her weapon, but other deputies disputed this. He was convicted of second-degree murder, which was reduced to involuntary manslaughter, but later reinstated. He was also convicted of attempted murder in the shooting of Young.
11 January 1982	George Gwaltney	10 May 1984	California Highway Patrol (California)	While on duty, Gwaltney handcuffed, raped, and shot aspiring actress Robin Bishop, later reporting that he found her body in the Mojave Desert.
26 May 1980	Robert Leroy Nelson	1988 (pleaded guilty)	Minnesota State Patrol (Minnesota)	While on duty, Nelson picked up runaway Michelle Busha and raped, tortured, and strangled her. Eight years later, Nelson confessed to the murder while being held for unrelated charges in Texas. Busha was not identified until 2015.
27 February 1978	Marcus Giardino	1978 (pleaded guilty)	Philadelphia Police Department (Pennsylvania)	Giardino shot Michael Carpenter in the back as he ran away, killing him. He pleaded guilty to involuntary manslaughter, the second time a Philadelphia police officer was convicted of killing a Black man.
5 May 1977	Terry W. Danson	7 October 1977	Houston Police Department (Texas)	Several officers, including Danson and Orlando, beat Joe Campos Torres at a secluded spot near a bayou. When a jail officer refused to take him before he was seen at a hospital, the officers brought him back to the secluded spot, where he was shoved into the water. Two of the other officers were granted immunity in exchange for their testimony.
5 May 1977	Stephen Orlando	7 October 1977	Houston Police Department (Texas)	Several officers, including Danson and Orlando, beat Joe Campos Torres at a secluded spot near a bayou. When a jail officer refused to take him before he was seen at a hospital, the officers brought him back to the secluded spot, where he was shoved into the water. Two of the other officers were granted immunity in exchange for their testimony.
13 June 1975	Thomas Ryan	1977	New York City Police Department (New York)	Officer Ryan beat to death 25-year-old burglary suspect Israel Rodriguez in the back of his patrol car parked at the 44th Precinct stationhouse.
24 July 1973	Darrell L. Cain	15 November 1973	Dallas Police Department (Texas)	Cain shot and killed 12-year-old Santos Rodriguez after arresting him on suspicion of having burglarized a local gas station. Cain shot Santos in the head after pointing his gun at the child in an attempt to extract a confession from him.
26 February 1965	James Bonard Fowler	15 November 2010 (pleaded guilty)	Alabama Highway Patrol (Alabama)	Fowler shot and killed unarmed civil rights activist Jimmie Lee Jackson during a peaceful demonstration in Marion, Alabama. Forty years later in 2005, Fowler admitted he had shot Jackson. In 2007, he was indicted for manslaughter, and in 2010, he pleaded guilty and was sentenced to six months in prison.
2 February 1958	Thomas Grady	1979 (pleaded guilty)	Milwaukee Police Department (Wisconsin)	Grady shot and killed Daniel Bell after a chase. Grady claimed Bell had lunged at him with a knife. However, in 1979, his partner confessed that Bell had planted the knife. Grady was convicted of reckless homicide and perjury and sentenced to seven years in prison and paroled after serving three years.
25 March 1938	Fred Paschal	May 1938	Seattle Police Department (Washington)	Police responding to a hotel were asked by the manager to remove Berry Lawson. The three officers severely beat Lawson, leading to his death. They claimed Lawson fell down the stairs and attempted to bribe a witness with $85 and a train ticket to Portland, Oregon. A jury found all three officers guilty of manslaughter, but none of them were jailed.
25 March 1938	W. F. Stephenson	May 1938	Seattle Police Department (Washington)	Police responding to a hotel were asked by the manager to remove Berry Lawson. The three officers severely beat Lawson, leading to his death. They claimed Lawson fell down the stairs and attempted to bribe a witness with $85 and a train ticket to Portland, Oregon. A jury found all three officers guilty of manslaughter, but none of them were jailed.
25 March 1938	Pat Whalen	May 1938	Seattle Police Department (Washington)	Police responding to a hotel were asked by the manager to remove Berry Lawson. The three officers severely beat Lawson, leading to his death. They claimed Lawson fell down the stairs and attempted to bribe a witness with $85 and a train ticket to Portland, Oregon. A jury found all three officers guilty of manslaughter, but none of them were jailed.
5 January 1926	John J. Brennan	27 January 1926	New York City Police Department (New York)	John J. Brennan had been illegally drinking and was in uniform when he went to the store owned by Samuel Krainin. He demanded that Krainin give him $2.00. Krainin refused, saying that business had been bad. In response, Brennan flew into a rage, beat Krainin with his baton, and fired a shot from his revolver in the store. Krainin later went to the Clymer Street Police Station and swore out a warrant for Brennan's arrest. The policemen were lined up and when Krainin picked Brennan out, the sergeant relieved him of his badge. The officer was about to take the revolver when Brennan drew his revolver and shot Krainin three times, killing him. Brennan was convicted of first degree murder, sentenced to death, and executed by electrocution at Sing Sing Prison on December 3, 1926.
31 March 1870	John Whiteside	1870	Philadelphia Police Department (Pennsylvania)	Whiteside chased Henry Truman into an alley following a shoplifting. When Truman asked the officer what he did wrong, Whiteside shot him. Whiteside was found guilty of manslaughter.

== See also ==
- Death in custody § United States
- Henry A. Wallace Police Crime Public Database
- List of cases of police brutality
- List of countries with annual rates and counts for killings by law enforcement officers
- List of law enforcement officers killed in the line of duty in the United States
- List of police reforms related to the George Floyd protests
- List of unarmed African Americans killed by law enforcement officers in the United States
- Lists of killings by law enforcement officers
- Police brutality in the United States
- Police misconduct § United States
- Police riot § United States
- Police use of deadly force in the United States
