= 2025 New York corrections officers' strike =

Wildcat strike by prison guards

- Date: February 17 – March 9, 2025
- Location: New York state prisons
- Caused by: Dissatisfaction with working conditions; Opposition to the HALT Act
- Methods: Strike action; Picketing
- Concessions: HALT Act suspended; Shifts limited to 12 hours, 8 hours in the future; Promise to address staffing issues

Parties
State prison guards	Government of the State of New York	New York State Correctional Officers & Police Benevolent Association

Casualties
- 9 prisoners dead, ~2,000 guards fired

In February and March 2025, officers employed by the New York State Department of Corrections and Community Supervision (DOCCS) went on a wildcat strike. This strike was not supported by the New York State Correctional Officers & Police Benevolent Association (NYSCOPBA), which is the union and collective bargaining agency for DOCCS employees. Public employees in New York state are barred from striking by law. Strikers demanded improved working conditions and the repeal of a state law restricting the use of solitary confinement.

Governor Kathy Hochul deployed the New York National Guard to prisons in the absence of the striking officers, and prisons were placed on long-term lockdown during the strike. Nine prisoners died during the strike, among them Messiah Nantwi; delays in medical care due to the strike contributed to some of these deaths. The first attempted deal was negotiated between the state and the NYSCOPBA, but was rejected by the strikers. The state then made a second offer directly to the strikers, which was accepted by the majority and by NYSCOPBA, ending the strike. Around 2,000 strikers still refused to return to work and were fired.

== Background ==
The last strike by state prison guards, in 1979, lasted for 16 days. The National Guard was also activated during that strike. That strike was considered a failure for the guards and their union.

The director of the Correctional Association of New York, an independent monitoring group, described the prison system as "teetering on the edge" before the strike. According to statistics from the DOCCS, assault of officers by prisoners nearly doubled in 2024, and assaults of prisoners by officers more than doubled. Officers were often forced to work 16- or 24-hour shifts. Representatives for NYSCOPBA stated that working conditions had been deteriorating since the passing of the 2022 HALT Act, which limits the use of solitary confinement and requires alternative rehabilitation programs. NYSCOPBA had previously sued to overturn the HALT Act before it went into effect. The union representatives also blamed a long-standing staffing crisis in state prisons. Like prisons across the United States, staffing decreased in state prisons after the COVID-19 pandemic: however, the state prison population declined faster, leaving New York state prisons with one guard per two prisoners, among the highest rates nationwide. Despite that, "structural short-staffing" remained a persistent problem.

At NYSCOPBA's bimonthly meeting earlier in February, some members unsuccessfully attempted to introduce a motion to strike. At that meeting, the executive board of the union voted that they had "no confidence" in DOCCS commissioner Daniel Martuscello III. Martuscello had recently written a memo saying that, due to staff shortages, DOCCS would have to make do at 70% staffing levels.

In the week preceding the strike, inmates at Collins Correctional Facility took control of three dorms. Lockdown at Collins was not lifted until the 15th. Charges against corrections officers involved in the killing of Robert Brooks were expected the week that the strike began; those charges came on February 20.

== Strike ==
Strikes began on February 17, with guards at Collins, Elmira Correctional Facility, Otisville Correctional Facility and Groveland Correctional Facility taking part. Twenty-five to 30 state prisons participated on the 18th, and all but one on the day after that. Striking guards picketed outside the prisons. Guards acknowledged that they were in violation of New York State's Taylor Law, which bars public employees from striking. On the 18th a state judge issued a restraining order requiring the strikers to return to work, but it was ignored. The NYSCOPBA, without condoning the strike, agreed with the strikers' complaints. Strike demands included:

- increased staffing,
- increased security screening for prison visitors and incoming mail,
- pay raises and increased hiring bonuses,
- reduced overtime mandates,
- return of "keep-lock" (confining inmates in quarters),
- repeal of the HALT Act.

DOCCS noted that some of these demands would require legislation, or violating the terms of the existing agreement with NYSCOPBA.

On February 19, Governor Hochul deployed 3,500 New York National Guard troops to operate and secure state prisons. Inmates at the Riverview Correctional Facility took control of several dorms on February 20: a news report said that there were 500 inmates and only 15 to 20 officers, and control was regained only with intervention by multiple outside agencies. That day, Martuscello temporarily suspended some provisions of the HALT Act, and the National Guard deployment grew to 4,500 troops. The deployment had the potential to reach 7,700 troops.

During the strike, cell blocks were placed on long-term lockdown. Inmates missed meals, medicine and medical care, and court dates during the strike. Basic tasks like providing meals fell to non-guard prison staff. National Guard troops working 12-hour shifts were often unable to leave the prisons, not provided with clear duties or means of self-defense, and found themselves sleeping on gym floors and eating the same meals as prisoners. An inmate aged 61 died in the last weekend of February, although the cause of death was unknown at the time. On March 1, Messiah Nantwi was killed by guards at Mid-State Correctional Facility, in a case similar to that of Robert Brooks. By March 4 seven prisoners were dead of various causes. By March 6 the total number had increased to nine. Two of those were due to delayed medical treatment, and one was a suicide by hanging where no officers were present to intervene.

The state and NYSCOPBA reached a deal at the end of February. However, most strikers rejected the deal and continued to strike into March. A news report on March 6 said that around 20 officers had been fired, and 5,200 were informed that their health insurance was cancelled.

On March 6, Martuscello made a final offer directly to the strikers. Concessions included a 90-day suspension of the HALT Act, a pay bump, and provisions to address staffing issues and reduce shifts to a maximum of 12 hours, to decrease to 8 hours once staffing issues resolved. The state and NYSCOPBA would form a committee to review the HALT Act. Officers terminated during the strike who returned to work would be reinstated and have their health benefits restored, and returning officers would not face discipline or fines under the Taylor Act. Officers who did not return to work by March 7 would be disciplined, fired, or possibly civilly or criminally charged. Reportedly, the attorney general of New York had been presented with a list of 1,000 strikers who could face contempt charges. The date for mandatory return shifted to March 10. Although NYSCOPBA balked at the state negotiating directly with the workers, it agreed to the offer.

== Aftermath ==
The deal between the state and NYSCOPBA was contingent on 85% of staff returning to work. That 85% was not quite met, but the state honored the agreement regardless. Around 2,000 guards who did not return were terminated, leaving around 10,000 guards, down from 13,500 before the strike. Those fired guards were initially barred from state employment. Two counties (Oneida and Chemung) filed suit, and the state declined to extend the ban past April 9, when the emergency order ended. Any rehired guards would need to retake training and become recertified.

The suspension of HALT continued after the 90-day deadline. The suspension was temporarily reversed by a court order on July 2.

=== Guard shortage ===
Around 6,000 National Guard troops remained at state prisons after March 9. The terms of the deployment of the National Guard changed from mandatory to voluntary on April 1; at the end of September, around 3,000 National Guard troops remained on duty.

On April 1, the state announced that, in order to address the shortage of guards, it would release some prisoners with 110 days or less of incarceration remaining. Any prisoners convicted of violent crimes, sex offenses, or serious felonies were ineligible. In February, Governor Hochul had sought the expedited closure of five state prisons. The 2025 state budget, passed in May, provided for closure of three prisons. As of August 2025, the state had not decided which three prisons to close.

In May, the legislature approved a bill to lower the age requirement for prison guards to 18. Younger guards would have to be supervised in their first year and a half, and would not be allowed to transport prisoners or carry firearms. In late May, guards salaries were increased by $9,000 or more.

== Responses ==
Governor Hochul characterized the strike as "illegal and unlawful" and said it put prisoners, the remaining workers at the prisons, and the communities at risk. Prisoner advocates called the strikes "life-threatening". An inmate said that prisoners were caught in the crossfire between the union and the state: an advocate accused the guards of effectively holding the prisoners hostage.

State legislators from upstate districts containing state prisons, such as Marianne Buttenschon, Scott Gray, Joseph Griffo, and Mark Walczyk, voiced support for the strikers and their demands.

The executive vice president of NYSCOPBA stated that its members had lost faith in the union.
