= LCPD =

LCPD may refer to:

== Police departments ==
- Lake Charles Police Department, Louisiana
- Las Cruces Police Department, New Mexico
- Lenoir City Police Department, Tennessee
- Lake City Police Department, a fictional police department in the American television series T. J. Hooker
- Liberty City Police Department, a fictional portrayal of the New York City Police Department in the Grand Theft Auto video game series

== Other uses ==
- Legg–Calvé–Perthes disease
- Large Combustion Plant Directive
