= Marcy State Hospital =

Marcy State Hospital or Marcy Psychiatric Center may refer to:

- A hospital in New York State that merged into the Mohawk Valley Psychiatric Center in 1985
- A hospital under the Pennsylvania State Hospitals in Pittsburgh, Pennsylvania that closed in 1982
