= Neck Canal of 1730 =

- Neck "Canal" of 1730
- U.S. National Register of Historic Places
- Location within New York Location within the United States
- Nearest city: Marcy, New York
- Coordinates: 43°7′48″N 75°16′28″W
- Area: 9 acres (3.6 ha)
- Built: 1730
- NRHP reference No.: 95001011
- Added to NRHP: August 15, 1995

Neck "Canal" of 1730 is a historic navigation channel located at Marcy in Oneida County, New York. It comprised the extant remains of a "canal" dug in 1730 to improve navigation along the Mohawk River. It was a short, hand dug channel cut across one of the many oxbows that once characterized the river in the 18th and 19th century. The channel was three feet deep, 20 feet wide, and 200 feet long.

It was listed on the National Register of Historic Places in 1995.
