= Central New York Psychiatric Center =

Psychiatric hospital in upstate New York

- New York State Office of Mental Health
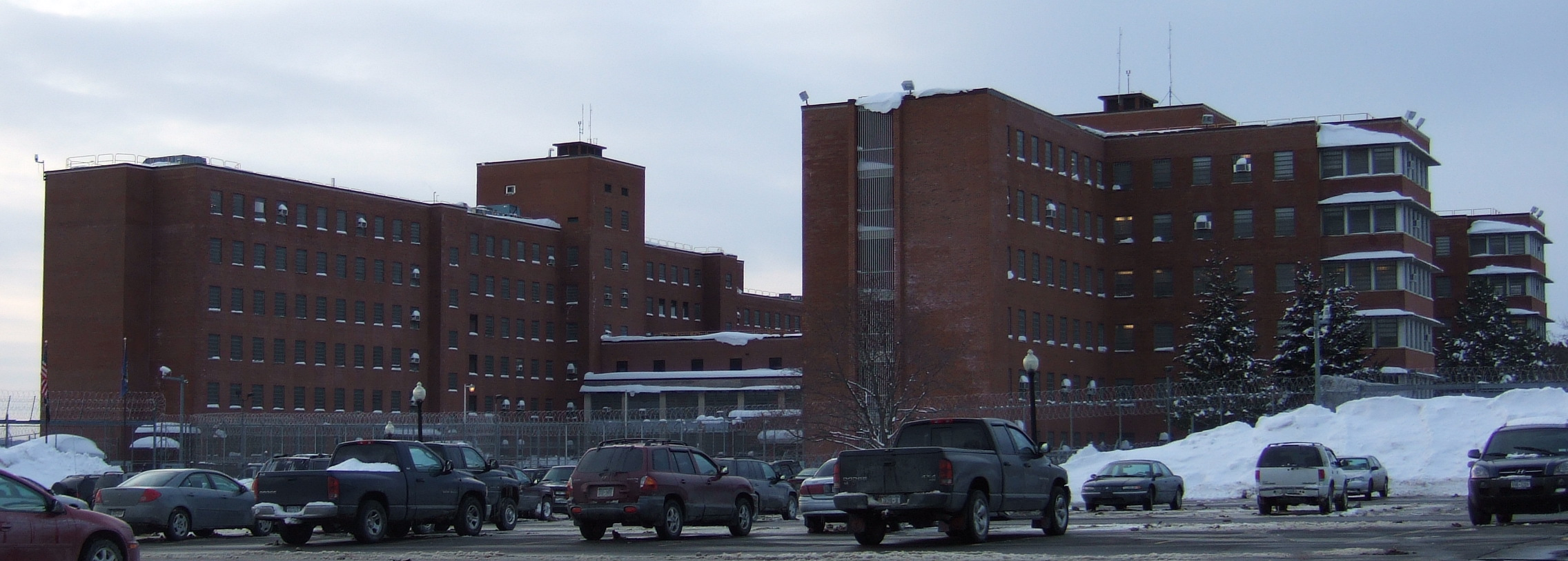

Geography
- Location: 9005 Old River Road, Marcy, New York, United States
- Coordinates: 43°10′1″N 75°18′9″W

Organization
- Type: Specialist

Services
- Standards: American Correctional Association, Joint Commission
- Beds: 206
- Speciality: Psychiatric hospital

History
- Opened: 1977

Links
- Website: omh.ny.gov/omhweb/facilities/cnpc/
- Lists: Hospitals in New York State

The Central New York Psychiatric Center (CNYPC) is a maximum-security forensic psychiatric hospital in Marcy, New York, United States. Part of the New York State Office of Mental Health, it bears responsibility for mental health services in all prisons of the New York State Department of Corrections and Community Supervision (DOCCS). Mentally ill prisoners may be involuntarily committed to CNYPC. Sex offenders are also civilly confined there. In addition to the hospital in Marcy, it maintains satellite units in prisons throughout New York State. CNYPC shares an address with Mid-State Correctional Facility and is adjacent to Marcy Correctional Facility.

== History ==
The first state-run mental health facility in New York state was the New York State Lunatic Asylum at Utica, established in 1843. After opening it began accepting transfers from county jails, and then state prisons in 1850. After prison transfers were found to came into conflict with civil patients, in 1859 they instead began to be sent to a new facility at Auburn Prison. When that became overcrowded, the Matteawan State Hospital was opened in 1892, and when that outgrew its limits, the Dannemora State Hospital opened in 1899. By the 1960s, Matteawan and Dannemora housed 3,000 inmates and suffered from extreme overcrowding. Transfer to and release from the two facilities was based only on a prison superintendent's certification, and lacked court review. After the 1966 Supreme Court case Baxstrom v. Herold, around 1,000 inmates in total were released from Dannemora and Matteawan.

The 1974 federal class action suit Negron v. Ward was raised by Matteawan inmates who alleged that conditions at Matteawan were cruel and unusual and that transfer to the jail ward of Matteawan was used punitively. In the aftermath of the suit and other criticisms of New York's handling of mental health in prisons, the legislature passed an act giving the Office of Mental Health responsibility for psychiatric treatment of prisoners, as well as to establish a hospital for commitment of mentally ill inmates. The Central New York Psychiatric Center was formally established on January 1, 1977. Initially housed at Matteawan, in September it moved to Marcy, into a building formerly part of the Marcy Psychiatric Center. Around 100 inmates were transferred to CNYPC, after which Matteawan closed. The remainder of Marcy Psychiatric would later become Mid-State Correctional Facility; Marcy Correctional Facility would be built across the street.

Also in 1977, CNYPC established seven satellite clinics at major state prisons. Initially the satellite units were administratively separate from the CNYPC hospital in Marcy, but consolidated in 1993. By 2004, CNYPC had units in 23 prisons. Kendra's Law, passed in 1999, gave judges the authority to mandate assisted outpatient treatment; CNYPC can pursue AOT orders for inmates before release. In New York, as a result of the Rivers v. Katz case, involuntary psychiatric medication may only be given to patients committed to a psychiatric center and only with court authorization. That case made CNYPC the only provider able to involuntarily treat prisoners.

After a 2006 murder at the Galleria at White Plains, the New York legislature passed the 2007 Sex Offender Management and Treatment Act (SOMTA), allowing for civil confinement of "dangerous sex offender(s)". Those confined under this law are held at CNYPC and the St. Lawrence Psychiatric Center in Ogdensburg. In a 2017 news article, a representative for the corrections officers' union complained of chaos at CNYPC, blaming it on a disconnect between DOCCS and OMH and ambiguity about how confined individuals fit into the prison and/or mental health system. While prisoner records are publicly available, a journalist found that CNYPC refused to confirm that an interview subject was confined there, citing privacy law.

In October 2021, a $40 million modernization and renovation project began at CNYPC.

In November 2021, an inmate was punched in the head by another inmate and died of his injuries a few days later.

== Demographics ==
A 1988 study found that CNYPC inmates had broadly similar racial and religious demographic characteristics to the general state prison population. Patients were significantly more likely to have never married, and significantly less likely to have graduated from high school. They were more likely to have committed a violent crime and have longer sentences. A 2017 report found that of those in civil confinement at CNYPC and St. Lawrence, two-thirds had no prior offense that would require them to register as a sex offender.

In a 2018 article in The Advocate, a recently confined man estimated that more than half of the population at CNYPC were gay or bisexual men.

== Notable inmates ==
David Berkowitz, the Son of Sam killer, spent two months at CNYPC before being admitted to Attica Correctional Facility.

Mark David Chapman was transferred to CNYPC during his 1982 hunger strike.

== See also ==
- Forensic psychiatry
- Forensic psychology
- Forensic psychotherapy
- Mentally ill people in United States jails and prisons
