= Killing of Messiah Nantwi =

2025 killing by prison guards in New York, US

- Part of 2025 New York corrections officers' strike
- Nantwi in an undated photo
- Date: March 1, 2025; 18 months ago
- Location: Mid-State Correctional Facility, Marcy, New York, U.S.; 43.1658°N 75.2958°W
- Type: Murders by law enforcement
- Participants: 10 prison guards (6 accused of assault, 4 of cover-up)
- Deaths: 1 (Messiah Nantwi)
- Accused: 15 prison guards
- Charges: Murder (2 counts); Manslaughter (7 counts); Gang assault (6 counts); Conspiracy (8 counts); Tampering with evidence (4 counts); Filing a false report (9 counts)

On March 1, 2025, Messiah Nantwi, a 22-year-old Black American man, was beaten by corrections officers who were part of an emergency response team at Mid-State Correctional Facility in Marcy, New York. He died at Wynn Hospital in Utica, New York later that day. Nantwi was being held in pre-trial detention on charges of shooting two men in Harlem in April 2023.

Fifteen staff members were initially placed on leave: ten were directly employed by Mid-State, while the other five were employed by Marcy Correctional Facility and were working at Mid-State during the incident. This killing occurred during the 2025 New York corrections officers' strike. As of October 2025 court proceedings against the officers are ongoing.

== Background ==
=== Messiah Nantwi ===
Messiah Nantwi was a 22-year-old Black man, who was being held in pre-trial for shooting and killing 19-year-old Jaylen Duncan and 36-year-old Brandon Brunson in Harlem in April 2023. He entered the state prison system in May 2024, and had been serving a sentence for second-degree criminal possession of a weapon, connected to a 2021 shootout with police.

=== Correction's officers' strike ===
On February 18, officers employed by the New York State Department of Corrections and Community Supervision (DOCCS) began a strike, demanding improved working conditions and the repeal of a state law restricting the use of solitary confinement. Nine prisoners would die during this strike, including Nantwi.

== Charges ==
In March, the Attorney General of New York recused herself from the investigation, and a special prosecutor was appointed.

On April 16, 2025, two guards connected to Nantwi's death were charged with murder. Overall, 10 prison guards were criminally charged in connection with Nantwi's death.

Two of the five Marcy officers were charged with manslaughter. The two prison guards who were charged with second-degree murder were directly employed by Mid-State. Five people would be charged with first degree manslaughter. Two sergeants at Mid-State were each charged with second-degree manslaughter after being accused of doing nothing to stop the assaults while supervising the area where Nantawi was beat to death. Of the 10 officers charged, six were accused of assaulting Nantwi, while the other four were only accused of making an effort to cover-up the incident by doing things such as filing false reports and participating in a plot which included planting a makeshift knife and cleaning up blood in Nantwi’s prison cell in an attempt to destroy evidence. Six of them would also be indicted on gang assault.

Eight of the officers would be indicted for conspiracy, four for tampering with physical evidence, and nine for using a false instrument for filing a report. As of August 2025, one officer, Nicholas Vitale, has pled guilty to offering a false instrument for filing and two others, Joshua Bartlett and Nathan Palmer, pled guilty to hindering prosecution and falsifying business records. Four additional unindicted officers also accepted plea offers. In December, while awaiting sentencing, Bartlett was indicted by a grand jury on separate sexual assault charges.

On June 17, Nantwi's family filed a federal civil rights lawsuit against the officers, the supervisor of the prison, and commissioner of the New York State Department of Corrections and Community Supervision.

== See also ==
- Killing of Robert Brooks
- List of unarmed African Americans killed by law enforcement officers in the United States
