= Mohawk Valley Psychiatric Center =

Psychiatric hospital

Coordinates: 43°6′18″N 75°15′12″W

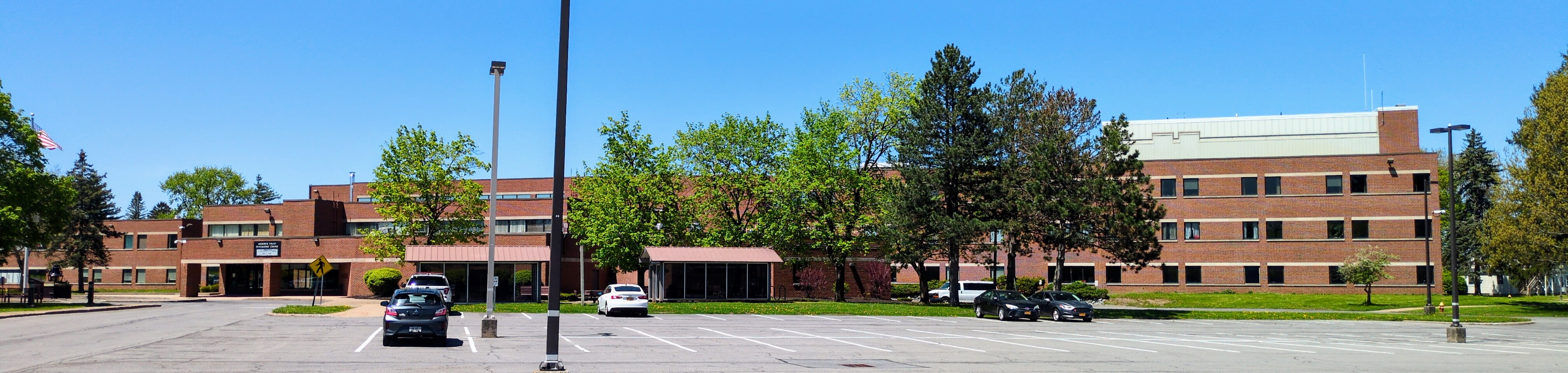

Geography
- Location: 1400 Noyes St, Utica, New York, United States

Organization
- Type: Specialist

Services
- Speciality: Psychiatric

History
- Former names: Marcy State Hospital; Marcy Psychiatric Center; Utica State Hospital
- Opened: 1836

Links
- Website: omh.ny.gov/omhweb/facilities/mvpc/
- Lists: Hospitals in New York State

Mohawk Valley Psychiatric Center is a state-run psychiatric hospital located in Utica, New York. It includes the McPike Addiction Treatment Center, a 68-bed inpatient facility, and runs a special education school for grades 4 through 12.

== History ==
Utica State Hospital was founded in 1836 and opened in 1843. It was New York State's first state-run mental health facility, and one of the first of its kind in the United States. The building was closed in 1977, and is now used for records storage.

In 1911 the state legislature purchased 1,000 acres (400 ha) in nearby Marcy, New York to move patients from Utica State Hospital out of the city, although Utica State Hospital remained in use well afterwards. The hospital opened a division in Marcy in 1922. Marcy State Hospital was made an independent entity in 1931. In 1974 it became the Marcy Psychiatric Center. Between 1947 and 1978, Marcy State Hospital ran a nursing school on site.

In 1977, the Central New York Psychiatric Center, a maximum-security psychiatric hospital for state prisoners, was established on the grounds of Marcy Psychiatric Center. In 1985, Marcy Psychiatric Center was merged with Utica Psychiatric Center to form the Mohawk Valley Psychiatric Center, located on the grounds of the old Utica State Hospital. The remainder of the Marcy site became the Mid-State Correctional Facility.

The center's inpatient psychiatric unit closed in 2012.
