= Prison visitation =

Prison visitation, in which someone held in prison is allowed to meet non-prisoners, is allowed in many jurisdictions, although rules differ by jurisdiction and it may be considered either a privilege or a right. Studies have evaluated its effect on recidivism. In person visitation is often used by attorneys to protect legal professional privilege.

== See also ==
- Conjugal visit
