= Mid-State Correctional Facility =

State prison for men located in New York, US

Coordinates: 43°10′03″N 75°17′52″W

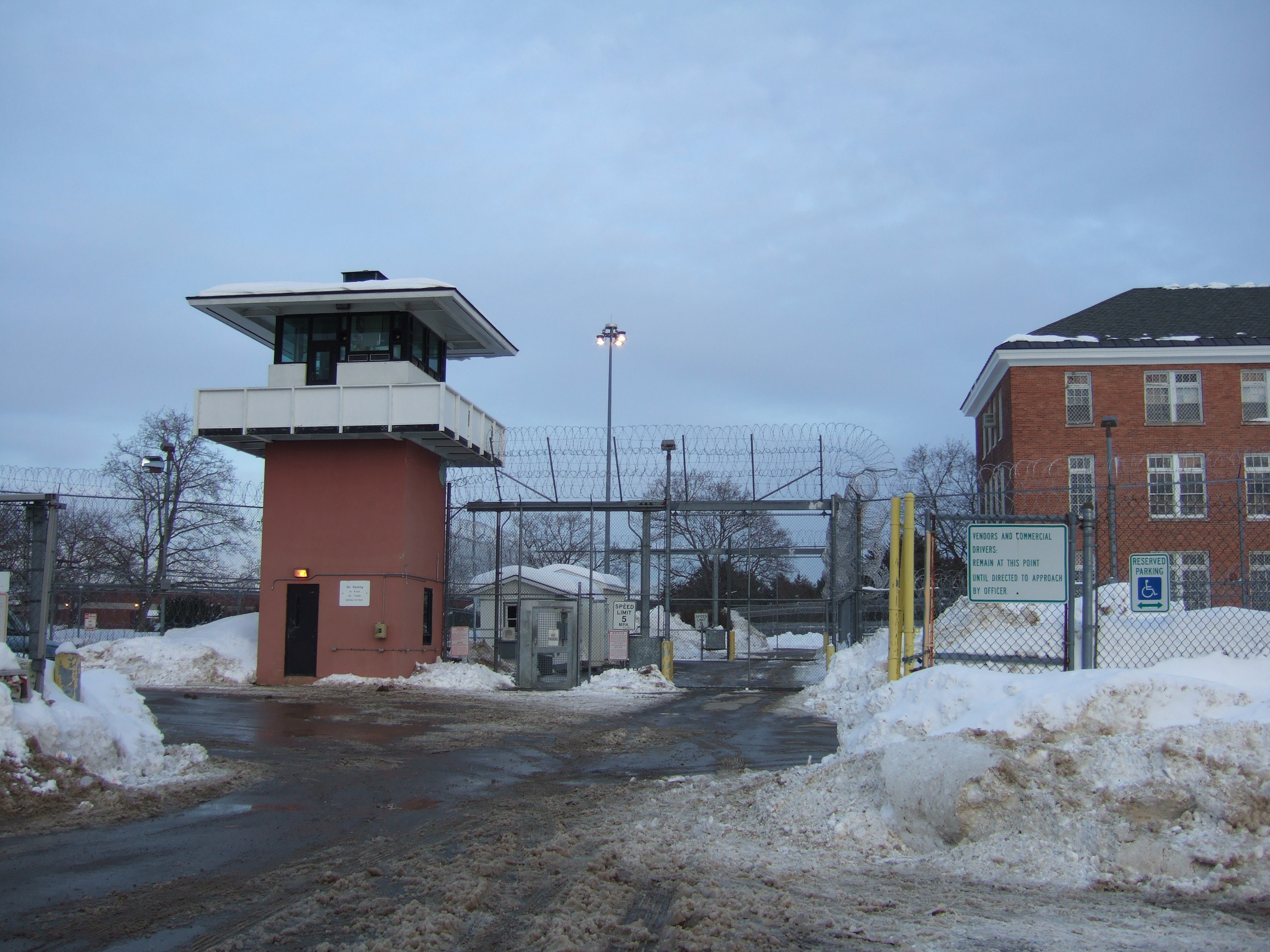
- An entrance to the Mid-State Correctional Facility
- Interactive map of Mid-State Correctional Facility
- Location: 9005 Old River Road Marcy, New York
- Status: open
- Security class: mixed
- Capacity: 1754
- Opened: 1983
- Managed by: New York State Department of Corrections and Community Supervision

Mid-State Correctional Facility is a medium-security state prison located in the town of Marcy, Oneida County, New York. Although classified as medium-security, Mid-State opened a maximum security unit in 1998. Mid-State is adjacent to the Central New York Psychiatric Center; both occupy the land of the former Marcy Psychiatric Center. Another state prison, Marcy Correctional Facility, sits across the street.

== Abuse ==
On April 13, 2023, three officers attacked an inmate and conspired to hide the attack. Brandon Montanari, Rohail Kahn, and Michael Williams, pleaded guilty on April 24, 2025. Montanari was sentenced to three years in prison.

In March 2025, 15 Mid-State staffers were placed on leave following the killing of Messiah Nantwi. This came shortly after the killing of Robert Brooks at Marcy Correctional. In April, ten guards in total were charged, two with murder, five with first-degree manslaughter, two with second-degree manslaughter, six with gang assault, eoght with conspiracy to cover up the killing, four with tampering with physical evidence, and eight with using a false instrument for filing a report.

== Notable prisoners ==
Inmate	Status	Details
Colin Ferguson	Serving a life sentence	Perpetrator of the 1993 Long Island Rail Road shooting in which he murdered 6 people on a passenger train
Gerald Garson	Served a 3.5-10 year sentence, paroled in 2009	Former New York Supreme Court justice, convicted of accepting bribes
Cormega		Hip-hop artist
Prodigy	Served 3 years	Hip-hop artist convicted of criminal possession of a weapon
Dennis Kozlowski	Served a 6 1/2 year sentence	Former CEO of Tyco International
Alan Hevesi	Paroled after serving 20 months	Former comptroller of the State of New York, convicted of taking bribes in return for investing in firms for the New York State Retirement Fund
Ja Rule	Served an 8 month sentence	Rapper and actor, arrested in July 2007 for gun and drug possession charges
