= Marcy Correctional Facility =

Medium-security state prison for men located in New York, US

- Interactive map of Marcy Correctional Facility
- Location: 9000 Old River Road Marcy, New York; 43°09′48″N 75°18′42″W
- Status: open
- Security class: medium
- Capacity: 1522
- Opened: 1988
- Managed by: New York State Department of Corrections and Community Supervision
- Website: Official website

Marcy Correctional Facility is a men's medium-security state prison in the town of Marcy, Oneida County, New York. Constructed across the street from Mid-State Correctional Facility and the Central New York Psychiatric Center, it opened on December 29, 1988.

== Incidents ==
Marcy was the subject of an October 2022 Correctional Association of New York oversight report released in 2023 that included a two-day monitoring visit and 117 interviews with inmates. Findings included poor food quality, a lack of hygienic goods, poor healthcare amenities due to staffing vacancies, racialized verbal and physical abuse against black inmates, widespread violence against inmates by staff, and an unresponsive grievance process.

On December 9, 2024, corrections officers fatally beat Robert Brooks while he was handcuffed in a medical examination room. The killing of Brooks prompted renewed scrutiny and investigations over Marcy Correctional Facility's history of abuse by staff. On February 20, 2025, "nearly a dozen" of those involved in the beating and death of Brooks, including at least six correctional officers, would be indicted by a grand jury and arrested on murder, manslaughter, gang assault and tampering with evidence charges. Three of the officers are defendants in other brutality suits, one alleging that they are part of a "beat-up squad" at the prison. In response, some state lawmakers have suggested closing the facility.

On March 1, 2025, prisoner Messiah Nantwi at the neighboring Mid-State Correctional Facility was beaten to death by corrections officers. Of the 15 officers initially named as persons of interest in the case, 5 were employed by Marcy and were working at Mid-State at the time. Two of those Marcy employees, Craig Klemick and Thomas Eck, were charged with manslaughter charges. Three of these five Marcy employees, Klemick, Eck and Nicholas Vitale, would also receive charges related to an effort to cover up details surrounding Nantwi's death. All of the 15 correctional officers of interest who were employed by the Marcy and Mid-State Correctional facilities have been either placed on leave or suspended.

The morning of November 7, 2025, a Muslim prison chaplain shot himself in the administrative offices of Marcy, using a gun he had brought in from outside. He died on the scene, leaving a note written in Arabic. State Senator Julia Salazar questioned why the chaplain was allowed to enter while possessing a gun. A spokesman of the state Department of Corrections said that under state law, staff cannot be forced to go through body scanners, although they can be randomly selected for bag searches or a pass through a metal detector.

In November 2026, the state of New York settled a lawsuit against Marcy for $650,000. The lawsuit was filed in 2022 by a prisoner at Marcy who claimed he was kicked in the head and body while handcuffed on the ground. Two officers named in the suit were also implicated in the death of Brooks.
