= Las Cruces Police Department =

Law enforcement agency in New Mexico, US

- Abbreviation: LCPD

Agency overview
- Formed: 1928

Jurisdictional structure
- Operations jurisdiction: United States
- Population: 100,000+
- Legal jurisdiction: Las Cruces, New Mexico

Operational structure
- Headquarters: Las Cruces, New Mexico
- Sworn members: 200
- Unsworn members: 83
- Units: Divisions: Field Operations; Investigative & Support; Administration; Metro Narcotics (Joint Unit)

Facilities
- Patrol Cars: List: Dodge Charger; Ford Explorer (Interceptor); Chevrolet Camaro
- Tacticals: Lenco BearCat (SWAT)

Website
- las-cruces.org

The Las Cruces Police Department (LCPD) is the principal law enforcement agency responsible for protecting the City of Las Cruces, New Mexico. LCPD, established in 1928, currently has an authorized strength of 200 officers and 83 civilian positions; LCPD serves a community of over 100,000. The Las Cruces Police Department is the second largest municipal police department in New Mexico.

The interim chief of police is Miguel Dominguez. In June 2020 he replaced Patrick Gallagher who resigned in the aftermath of an officer killing a citizen.

== Organization ==
The department is organized into a number of divisions and units:

- Administration
  - Public information office
- Field operations division
  - Patrol Section (Patrol Section, K-9 Unit, Crisis Intervention Unit, & Street Crimes Unit)
  - Traffic Section (Traffic Investigation, Police Service Aids)
- Internal affairs
- Investigative & support division
  - Administrative Support Section
  - Criminal Investigations Section
  - Codes Enforcement and Animal Control Section
  - Community Outreach (TNT Unit, School Resource Unit, & Community Liaison Officer)
- Metro narcotics is a joint unit of the Las Cruces Police Department, the Doña Ana County Sheriff's Office, and New Mexico State Police
- Research & development

The department runs its own police academy. The course takes five and a half months.

The department is allotted the following billets:

Title	Positions	Insignia
Chief of Police	1	
Deputy Chief	2	
Lieutenant	8	
Sergeant	23	
Police Officer/Detective	157	

== Equipment ==
=== Transportation ===
The Las Cruces Police uses the following vehicles.

- Chevrolet Camaro
- Dodge Charger
- Lenco BearCat (SWAT Unit)
- Ford Explorer (Interceptor)

=== Weapons ===
- Accuracy International AWM (.338 Lapua Magnum) Used by SWAT team snipers.
- Colt 9mm SMG
- Remington 700 (.308 Winchester)

== Notable events ==
In February 2020, officer Christopher Smelser killed Antonio Valenzuela during an arrest after a traffic stop. Valenzuela ran from police, who attempted to tase him, eventually subduing Valenzuela on the ground. In a video of the incident, Smelser told Valenzuela, "I'm going to fucking choke you out, bro", and Valenzuela was heard gasping for air. The autopsy ruled that Valenzuela died of "asphyxia injuries due to physical restraint", with the department's police chief stating that Smelser had used a "vascular neck restraint". The autopsy also stated that methamphetamines consumed by Valenzuela also "significantly" contributed to his death.

After the police officer was charged with murder, he was fired. The city agreed to pay over six million dollars to settle the civil side of the matter.

On February 11, 2024, the LCPD suffered their first officer killed in the line of duty when patrol officer Jonah Hernandez was fatally stabbed by Armando "AJ" Silva, a suspect with a criminal record and mental health problems. Silva then tried to attack his cousin Araceli and her boyfriend Issiah Astorga, who were on the scene. Astorga fatally shot Silva in self-defense. The Doña Ana County District Attorney and Assistant District Attorney refused to press charges against Astorga, ruling his killing of Silva as justifiable homicide. Jonah was laid to rest in his hometown of El Paso.
