= Murder of Robert Brooks =

2024 US homicide in custody

- Body camera footage of Brooks after being beaten and shortly before his death
- Date: December 9–10, 2024; 1 year ago
- Location: Marcy Correctional Facility Town of Marcy, New York, US; 43.1658°N 75.2958°W
- Type: Killing by law enforcement
- Deaths: 1 (Robert Brooks)
- Accused: 19 (13 corrections officers, 4 sergeants, 2 nurses)
- Charges: Second-degree murder (6 counts); Manslaughter (3 counts); Tampering with evidence (1 count)

On December 9, 2024, Robert Brooks, a 43-year-old black man, was transferred from Mohawk Correctional Facility to Marcy Correctional Facility, both in New York state, where he was repeatedly beaten by prison officers. Brooks died from his injuries the following morning on December 10 at Wynn Hospital in Utica, New York.

Body camera footage showed that Brooks was handcuffed and had a prior facial injury and appeared to be compliant before being fatally beaten. Brooks died due to compression of the neck and multiple blunt force injuries. After an internal review, Governor of New York State Kathy Hochul directed the New York State Department of Corrections and Community Supervision (NYSDOCCS) to fire 13 officers and a prison nurse involved in the incident. On February 20, 2025, second-degree murder, gang assault, manslaughter, and tampering with evidence charges were brought against six prison officers. Seventeen employees, including four sergeants and two nurses, were suspended. Four others faced varying charges including manslaughter and evidence tampering.

== Background ==
Prior to the killing of Robert Brooks, Marcy Correctional Facility was the subject of numerous reports of prisoner abuse. C.O. Anthony Farina and Sergeant Glenn Trombly, both implicated in the killing of Robert Brooks, were involved in the 2020 assault and disfigurement of the inmate William Alvarez. In 2015, Trombly was involved in the assault of the inmate Equarn White, after which White needed a wheelchair while recovering. C.O. Nicholas Anzalone, also implicated in the killing of Brooks, was one of four Marcy officers named in a federal lawsuit for the 2020 beating of Adam Bauer, a non-violent drug offender.

Robert L. Brooks was a 43-year-old inmate serving a 12-year sentence since 2017 for first-degree assault in the stabbing of his ex-girlfriend. He was a musician who completed a GED while incarcerated.

== Incident ==
On December 9, Brooks was transferred from Mohawk Correctional Facility to Marcy Correctional Facility to be brought to a medical examination room and sat on an examination table while handcuffed. The right side of Brooks's face was bleeding. An officer then forced a white object in Brooks's mouth while another officer held his throat. Multiple officers then struck the restrained Brooks in his face, torso, groin, and buttocks. Several officers stood in the room as passive bystanders. Two officers then lifted Brooks, who was unresponsive, by his shirt in an attempt to throw him up against a nearby window. The motionless Brooks was then placed on the examination table, where an officer conducted a sternal rub.

A preliminary examination named the cause of death as "asphyxia due to compression of the neck," from the beating. "Robert [Brooks] died of massive beating to his body, both externally and internally. Several of his internal organs were bruised, his hyoid bone was fractured, his thyroid cartilage was ripped. He also died as a result of repeated restrictions to his airways, causing severe brain damage. And finally, he died by choking on his own blood," Onandaga County District Attorney William Fitzpatrick said after the indictment.

Identified officers involved in the incident include C.O. Anthony Farina; Sergeant Glenn Trombly; C.O. Nicholas Anzalone; C.O. Matthew Galliher; Sergeant Michael Marshaw; C.O. Christopher Walrath; C.O. Nicholas Kieffer; and C.O.s Along, David Kingsley, Kessler, David Walters, and Nicholas Gentile. Other involved personnel include Kyle Dashnaw, RN Patricia Matos, and Abedin Mehmedovic.

== Aftermath ==
The beating received widespread condemnation. NYSDOCCS commissioner Daniel F. Martuscello III made a statement that “It is not enough to simply condemn this horrific act and then go back to business,” emphasizing that his department now audits body cameras to ensure they remain activated at correctional facilities. NYSDOCCS declined to comment when it was revealed that at least three officers involved in the beating of Brooks (Anzalone, Trombly, and Farina) had documented prior histories of violence and abuse against prisoners.

On December 21, New York governor Kathy Hochul ordered the firing of 13 officers and 1 nurse involved in the incident following an internal review. The NYSCOPBA police union representing the involved officers called the events "a disgrace to their profession." On December 28, the Federal Bureau of Investigation announced that the FBI Albany Field Office was investigating the killing of Brooks. Because the office of the Attorney General of New York represents state employees facing legal action related to their jobs, lawyers from Attorney General Letitia James's office were assigned to defend four of the officers involved; consequently, James announced that she would recuse herself from the investigation. Onondaga County District Attorney William J. Fitzpatrick was appointed to serve as special counsel in James's place.

Body camera footage of the incident was made public on December 27. The recorded bodycam footage has video but no audio as the 4 officers who wore bodycams during the incident had them powered on but not activated so the footage was recorded in the bodycam's stand-by mode where it does not record sound. Brooks's autopsy, released in February 2025, ruled that his death was a homicide, caused by compression of the neck and multiple blunt force injuries.

State lawmakers have responded with various proposals for reform, such as enlarging the New York State Commission of Correction and appointing an independent investigator. Closing the facility has also been proposed.

== Criminal charges ==
On February 20, New York Governor Kathy Hochul announced that prison workers would be arrested and charged with murder in connection with the killing of Brooks. A grand jury issued murder, manslaughter, gang assault and tampering with evidence charges. Seventeen corrections department employees — including four sergeants, 11 correction officers, and two nurses — were already suspended and facing discipline.

On May 5, Walrath accepted a plea bargain reducing his charges from murder to manslaughter, with a 15-year prison sentence. On May 14, Gentile pled guilty to attempted tampering with physical evidence, and was sentenced to one-year conditional discharge. Trial for the remaining officers was set for October 6.

On November 21, four of the officers involved — Anthony Farina, Nicholas Anzalone, Michael Mashaw and David Walters — were sentenced by Oneida County Court Judge Robert L. Bauer. Farina and Anzalone were both sentenced to 22 years in prison on a charge of first-degree manslaughter. Mashaw, the ranking officer in the infirmary at the time of the assault, was sentenced to three to nine years in prison on a charge of second-degree manslaughter. Walters was sentenced to 28 months to 7 years in prison on a charge of second-degree manslaughter. While Walters was not accused of putting his hands on Brooks, he admitted he was present during the assault, failed to intervene, and verbally prevented a nurse from entering to help Brooks.

On January 16, 2026, Fisher pled guilty to a lesser charge of reckless endangerment.

Of the ten former guards who were charged in connection to Brooks' death, David Kingsley is the only one who was convicted of murder. He was sentenced to 25 years to life.

On September 21, 2026, attorneys for the family of Brooks announced that they would receive $24 million in a settlement from the state of New York, resolving all remaining claims. They stated that it was the largest settlement to date for a death in prison in New York.

== See also ==
- Killing of Messiah Nantwi
- List of unarmed African Americans killed by law enforcement officers in the United States
- Lynching of Robert Hall
