= Marcy, New York =

- Town
- Location in Oneida County and the state of New York
- Coordinates: 43°10′N 75°17′W
- Country: United States
- State: New York
- County: Oneida

Government
  - Type: Town Council
  - Town Supervisor: Brian N. Scala (R)
  - Town Council: Members' List: • James P. Goodman (D); • Keith P. Schuderer (R); • Brendon M. Candella (D); • Gregory J. Johnson (R)

Area
  - Total: 33.32 sq mi (86.29 km^{2})
  - Land: 32.89 sq mi (85.18 km^{2})
  - Water: 0.43 sq mi (1.11 km^{2})
- Elevation: 827 ft (252 m)

Population (2020)
  - Total: 8,777
  - Density: 286.1/sq mi (110.47/km^{2})
- Time zone: UTC-5 (Eastern (EST))
  - Summer (DST): UTC-4 (EDT)
- ZIP Codes: 13403 (Marcy); 13469 (Stittville); 13354 (Holland Patent); 13502 (Utica)
- Area code: 315
- FIPS code: 36-45535
- GNIS feature ID: 0979197
- Website: Town of Marcy, NY

Marcy is a town in Oneida County, New York, United States. The population was 8,777 at the 2020 census. The town was named after Governor William L. Marcy. It lies between the cities of Rome and Utica. The Erie Canal passes through the southern part of the town.

The town is home to the SUNY Polytechnic Institute, a four-year public research university in the southeastern part of town.

== History ==
The first settlers arrived circa 1773. During the American Revolution, the settlers, having been warned by a friendly Oneida Indian about an enemy raid, abandoned their farms until after the war. The town was resettled in 1792.

The Town of Marcy was formed in 1832 from part of the Town of Deerfield, located to the east.

The Neck Canal of 1730 was listed on the National Register of Historic Places in 1995.

== Geography ==
According to the United States Census Bureau, the town has a total area of 33.4 square miles (87 km^{2}), of which 33.0 square miles (85 km^{2}) is land and 0.4 square miles (1.0 km^{2}) (1.35%) is water.

The Mohawk River defines the southern town line.

The New York State Thruway (Interstate 90) passes through the southeastern corner of the town.

The Erie Canal (also known as the Barge Canal) passes through the south end of the town, running along River Road, with Lock 20 Canal Park just east of the Route 291 bridge lying on the canal.

SUNY Polytechnic Institute is located on 700 acres northwest of the intersection of the North-South Arterial (NY 8 and NY 12) and NY 49.

== Demographics ==
Historical population
| Census | Pop. | Note | %± |
|---|---|---|---|
| 1840 | 1,799 | | — |
| 1850 | 1,857 | | 3.2% |
| 1860 | 1,687 | | −9.2% |
| 1870 | 1,451 | | −14.0% |
| 1880 | 1,413 | | −2.6% |
| 1890 | 1,213 | | −14.2% |
| 1900 | 1,398 | | 15.3% |
| 1910 | 1,301 | | −6.9% |
| 1920 | 1,191 | | −8.5% |
| 1930 | 2,604 | | 118.6% |
| 1940 | 4,528 | | 73.9% |
| 1950 | 5,210 | | 15.1% |
| 1960 | 7,024 | | 34.8% |
| 1970 | 7,877 | | 12.1% |
| 1980 | 6,222 | | −21.0% |
| 1990 | 8,685 | | 39.6% |
| 2000 | 9,481 | | 9.2% |
| 2010 | 8,982 | | −5.3% |
| 2020 | 8,777 | | −2.3% |
U.S. Decennial Census

As of the census of 2000, there were 9,469 people, 2,003 households, and 1,526 families residing in the town. The population density was 287.2 inhabitants per square mile (110.9/km^{2}). There were 2,073 housing units at an average density of 62.9 per square mile (24.3/km^{2}). The racial makeup of the town was 68.42% White, 22.20% African American, 0.27% Native American, 0.60% Asian, 0.04% Pacific Islander, 6.55% from other races, and 1.91% from two or more races. Hispanic or Latino people of any race were 14.02% of the population.

There were 2,003 households, out of which 33.0% had children under the age of 18 living with them, 65.5% were married couples living together, 6.9% had a female householder with no husband present, and 23.8% were non-families. 19.6% of all households were made up of individuals, and 8.0% had someone living alone who was 65 years of age or older. The average household size was 2.60 and the average family size was 2.99.

In the town, the population was spread out, with 13.2% under the age of 18, 13.4% from 18 to 24, 44.7% from 25 to 44, 20.3% from 45 to 64, and 8.5% who were 65 years of age or older. The median age was 36 years. For every 100 females, there were 242.8 males. For every 100 females age 18 and over, there were 276.2 males.

The median income for a household in the town was $47,180, and the median income for a family was $54,231. Males had a median income of $30,943 versus $25,044 for females. The per capita income for the town was $16,182. About 3.7% of families and 5.4% of the population were below the poverty line, including 9.2% of those under age 18 and 2.3% of those age 65 or over.

== Government and infrastructure ==
There are two New York State Department of Corrections and Community Supervision prisons in the town: Marcy Correctional Facility and Mid-State Correctional Facility. The Central New York Psychiatric Center is a New York State Office of Mental Health inpatient hospital for state prisoners.

== Communities and locations in Marcy ==
- Careys Corners – A hamlet in the southern part of the town by the Erie Canal. This no longer exists. It is now the offramp for NY 291 from the Utica-Rome Expressway.
- Marcy – The hamlet of Marcy is in the southern section of the town.
- Marcy Correctional Facility – A state prison located near Marcy
- Marcy Hill – An elevation located north of Utica
- Maynard – A hamlet in the southeastern part of the town.
- Mid-State Correctional Facility – A prison near Marcy
- Stittville – A hamlet in the northwestern corner of the town
- Frederick R. Clark Energy Center of the New York Power Authority
- Marcy Substation – A major electrical substation for New York's entire power transmission grid at the Clark Energy Center, owned by the New York Power Authority

== Education ==
Much of the town is in the Whitesboro Central School District. Other parts of the town are in Holland Patent Central School District and Oriskany Central School District.

Marcy Elementary School, of the Whitesboro district, is in the Marcy CDP. The district's secondary schools are Whitesboro Middle School and Whitesboro High School.

SUNY Polytechnic Institute is in the town.

== Notable people ==
- Rufus J. Dryer, modernist painter from Rochester; died in Marcy
- Lynette "Squeaky" Fromme, former member of the Manson Family and attempted assassin of Gerald Ford; lives in Marcy
- Rouse Simmons, Wisconsin legislator and businessman; born in Marcy
