= Patrick Baxter =

Patrick Baxter may refer to:

- Patrick Baxter (politician) (1891–1959), Irish politician
- Patrick Baxter (serial killer) (born 1969), American serial killer and rapist
