= Collins Correctional Facility =

Medium security prison in Collins, New York, US

Coordinates: 42°29′18″N 78°56′13″W

- Interactive map of Collins Correctional Facility
- Location: Collins, New York, USA
- Status: Operational
- Security class: Medium Security
- Capacity: 1,700
- Opened: 1982
- Managed by: New York State Department of Corrections and Community Supervision

Collins Correctional Facility is a medium security prison in Collins, New York in the United States. The prison is located in the south part of Erie County in the Town of Collins. It is adjacent to the now-closed Gowanda Correctional Facility, another medium-security prison. Both prisons are located north of the Village of Gowanda, at the southern end of Erie County.

== History ==
In 1894, the Erie County Legislature passed an Act that gave rise to the Homeopathic State Hospital (later known as the "Gowanda Psychiatric Center," prior to being much later-converted into correctional facilities) in Gowanda and Collins, New York. Land purchased for the State Hospital by Erie County included 500 acres and was known as the "Taylor tract." When the State Care Act was effected in 1894, the land was transferred to the State of New York, which then conveyed it to the State Hospital. The correctional facility is situated along Taylor Hollow Road in Gowanda, with such road named for the farmer who owned the land that was purchased and used, originally, for the State Hospital. Approximately 50% of the residents are sex offenders, who are offered treatment.

The grounds and buildings of both the Gowanda Correctional Facility and the Collins Correctional Facility, therefore, were formerly the Gowanda Psychiatric Center. In 1982, 40% of the original 500 acres of the Gowanda Psychiatric Center was utilized for the Collins Correctional Facility. The Gowanda Correctional Facility was built using the remaining acreage and opened its doors in 1994. The two prisons were separated by a fence, and are administered independently. Collins Correctional Facility houses 1,700 inmates.

Collins is unusual in that it contains two separate sections, with two mess halls, two medical facilities, two libraries, etc. They are separated by a road, with no secure passageway from one section to the other. Prisoners being transferred from one section to the other are manacled as with any trip outside prison walls. Transfers are frequent, several times a day. All inmate arrivals and departures take place from the north section.

The prison also contains a security housing unit, also known as a SHU, for inmates who assault staff or other inmates and for those who disobey the prison rules. It is a three tier disciplinary system, with three being the most severe.

== See also ==
- List of New York state prisons
