= List of places in New York: Z =

This list of current cities, towns, unincorporated communities, counties, and other recognized places in the U.S. state of New York also includes information on the number and names of counties in which the place lies, and its lower and upper zip code bounds, if applicable.

List of places in New York: A | B | C | D | E | F | G | H | I | J | K | L | M | N | O | P | Q | R | S | T | U | V | W | X | Y | Z

Name of place	Counties	Principal county	Lower zip code
Zena	1	Ulster County	12498
Zoar	1	Erie County	
Zoar	1	Jefferson County	13682
Zurich	1	Wayne County	
