= Downstate New York =

Region of New York

Downstate New York is a region that is generally described as consisting of the southeastern and more densely populated portion of the U.S. state of New York, in contrast to upstate New York, which comprises a larger geographic area with much sparser population distribution. While there is no widely agreed upon definition, the Downstate region is considered to consist of several subregions including New York City, Long Island, the Mid and Lower Hudson Valley and may also be considered by residents to include the Mid-Hudson Valley and Catskill Mountains areas. The New York State Department of Transportation (NYSDOT) defines its "Downstate Region" as including Dutchess and Orange counties, and the counties east and south of them in regions 8, 9 and 10 of the inset map. Both agencies and the general public use varying definitions of the boundary between Upstate and Downstate.

The Downstate region contains approximately two-thirds of New York's entire population. Its layout is largely urban and suburban, and constitutes New York State's portion of the New York metropolitan area, the world's largest urban landmass. New York City, the most populous city in the United States, is home to the United Nations headquarters, and has been described as the cultural, financial, and media capital of the world, as well as the world's most economically powerful city. The Upstate New York region, conversely, which forms the vast majority of the state's land area, contains more undeveloped land, including forests and farmland.

== Official usage ==
One official usage of the term is by the State University of New York (SUNY) system in the name of its southernmost medical school, SUNY Downstate Medical Center, located in the East Flatbush neighborhood of Brooklyn in New York City. The New York State Department of Transportation also uses the term. The term is also used by the New York State Department of Corrections (NYSDOC) system in the name of its Downstate Correctional Facility in Fishkill, New York.

== See also ==
- New York metropolitan area
