= Sir Taurus =

American Standardbred racehorse

- Breed: Standardbred
- Sire: Speedy Crown (1968) (1:57.1) ($545,495)
- Grandsire: Speedy Scot (1960) (1:56.4) ($650,909)
- Dam: Vanessa Hill (1972) (2:00.4f) ($112,584)
- Damsire: Hickory Pride (1956) (1:59.2) ($166,666)
- Sex: Stallion
- Foaled: March 20, 1984 (age 42)
- Country: United States
- Colour: Bay
- Breeder: Lindy Farm (Somersville, Connecticut)
- Owner: Dan Gernatt Farms, Antonacci Family
- Trainer: Jimmy Takter
- Earnings: $484,810 (1986-1987)

Major wins
- 11

Awards
- World Champion; World record holder on half-mile track (1:57.2h)

Honours
- Best mile rate: 1:56.3
- Last updated on 2014-07-04

Sir Taurus is a Standardbred harness racehorse, foaled on March 20, 1984, at Lindy Farms in Somersville, Connecticut in the United States. Sir Taurus' sire was Speedy Crown, and his dam was Vanessa Hill. Speedy Crown's sire was Speedy Scot, and his dam was Missile Toe; Vanessa Hill's sire was Hickory Pride, and her dam was Viola Hill.

== Career ==
Sir Taurus' winnings were $484,810, after racing for only two years in 1986 and 1987. He had 11 major wins during his racing career. Sir Taurus was a world champion; co-holder of a world record for three-year-old colt trotters on a half-mile track with a time of 1:57.2h; and had set six track records throughout his career at that time. His fastest time for the mile was 1:56.3. As a two-year-old, Sir Taurus tied or held track records at Syracuse, Pompano, and Greenwood. As a three-year-old, he held track records at Brandywine Raceway, Goshen, and Pocono.

Sir Taurus' trainer and driver was Jimmy Takter for the Antonacci family and Daniel R. Gernatt, Sr. of Dan Gernatt Farms. The Yonkers Raceway in Yonkers, New York annually holds the Sir Taurus Trot for Standardbred harness racing.

== Progeny ==
Of Sir Taurus' nearly 700 offspring, Approved Action (1:54.1) earned the most in winnings with $715,676. Sir Taurus' offspring have earned $23.7 million in combined winnings. Of all offspring of Sir Taurus (with Amanda T. Collins, a daughter of Texas), Red Hot Blue Chip sold for the most money at $52,000 in 1999.

== Retirement ==
Said to be an easygoing horse with a gentle nature, Sir Taurus turned 30 in 2014, and is at Blue Chip Farms, now retired, providing school children and scouts with opportunities to visit him. On July 5, 2014, Sir Taurus appeared for photo opportunities with visitors at the horse racetrack in Goshen.

== Pedigree ==
Pedigree of Sir Taurus (USA), Standardbred bay, 1984
Sire Speedy Crown 1988 1:57.1; $545,495	Speedy Scot (1960); 1:56.4; $650,909	Speedster (1954); 4,1:59.4m; $97,184	Rodney (1944); 5,T1:57.2m; $111,176
Sire Speedy Crown 1988 1:57.1; $545,495	Speedy Scot (1960); 1:56.4; $650,909	Speedster (1954); 4,1:59.4m; $97,184	Mimi Hanover (1945); 2:09h; $8,959
Sire Speedy Crown 1988 1:57.1; $545,495	Speedy Scot (1960); 1:56.4; $650,909	Scotch Love (1954); 2,T2:04.3m; $8,345	Victory Song (1943); 4,1:57.3m; $73,859
Sire Speedy Crown 1988 1:57.1; $545,495	Speedy Scot (1960); 1:56.4; $650,909	Scotch Love (1954); 2,T2:04.3m; $8,345	Selka Scot (1945); 4,2:13.3h; $1,408
Sire Speedy Crown 1988 1:57.1; $545,495	Missile Toe (1962); 2:05.2h; $22,362	Florican (1947); 1:57.2m; $152,222	Spud Hanover (1936); 4,2:03m; $7,917
Sire Speedy Crown 1988 1:57.1; $545,495	Missile Toe (1962); 2:05.2h; $22,362	Florican (1947); 1:57.2m; $152,222	Florimel (1938); 2,2:03½m; $16,594
Sire Speedy Crown 1988 1:57.1; $545,495	Missile Toe (1962); 2:05.2h; $22,362	Worth A Plenty (1954); 3,T2:02.2m; $7,560	Darnley (1940); 4,1:59¾m; $21,565
Sire Speedy Crown 1988 1:57.1; $545,495	Missile Toe (1962); 2:05.2h; $22,362	Worth A Plenty (1954); 3,T2:02.2m; $7,560	Sparkle Plenty (1948); 3,2:07.3h; $5,990
Dam Vanessa Hill 1972 2:00.4f; $112,584	Hickory Pride (1956); 1:59.2; $166,666	Star's Pride (1947); 5,1:57.1m; $140,969	Worthy Boy (1940); 3,2:02.4m; $25,688
Dam Vanessa Hill 1972 2:00.4f; $112,584	Hickory Pride (1956); 1:59.2; $166,666	Star's Pride (1947); 5,1:57.1m; $140,969	Stardrift (1936); 6,2:03m; $6,890
Dam Vanessa Hill 1972 2:00.4f; $112,584	Hickory Pride (1956); 1:59.2; $166,666	Misty Hanover (1941); 2.08.3h; $8,765	Dean Hanover (1934); 3,T1:58½m
Dam Vanessa Hill 1972 2:00.4f; $112,584	Hickory Pride (1956); 1:59.2; $166,666	Misty Hanover (1941); 2.08.3h; $8,765	Twilight Hanover (1937)
Dam Vanessa Hill 1972 2:00.4f; $112,584	Viola Hill (1967)	B.F. Coaltown (1960); 3,T2:00.1m; $78,845	Galophone (1952); 4,T1:58.1m; $286,807
Dam Vanessa Hill 1972 2:00.4f; $112,584	Viola Hill (1967)	B.F. Coaltown (1960); 3,T2:00.1m; $78,845	Sis Rodney (1951); 3,T2:05.3m; $7,066
Dam Vanessa Hill 1972 2:00.4f; $112,584	Viola Hill (1967)	Vickie Hill (1961); 3,2:07.2h; $16,639	Victory Song (1943); 4,1:57.3m; $73,859
Dam Vanessa Hill 1972 2:00.4f; $112,584	Viola Hill (1967)	Vickie Hill (1961); 3,2:07.2h; $16,639	Scotch Hill (1951); T2:06.1m; $12,038
