= Gallo Blue Chip =

American Standardbred racehorse (1997–2025)

- Breed: Standardbred
- Sire: Magical Mike (1991) (1:50.2) ($1,682,080)
- Grandsire: Tyler B. (1977) (1:55.1) ($887,338)
- Dam: Camatross (1981)
- Damsire: Albatross (1968) ($1:54.3)
- Sex: Gelding
- Foaled: 1997
- Died: January 22, 2025 (aged 28); Wallkill, New York, U.S.
- Country: United States
- Colour: Bay
- Breeder: Dan Gernatt Farms (Collins, New York)
- Owner: Martin Scharf
- Trainer: Mark Ford
- Earnings: $4,260,959

Major wins
- 53

Awards
- Best mile rate: 1:48.4; Leading Money Pacer of All Time; World Champion on a 5/8 mile track American Harness Horse of the Year (2000); United States Pacer of the Year (2000, 2001)

Honours
- United States Harness Racing Hall of Fame (2011)
- Last updated on 2014-07-06

Gallo Blue Chip (1997 – January 22, 2025) was an American Standardbred harness racing horse who earned $4.2 million in total winnings during his racing career. Gallo Blue Chip's sire was Magical Mike, and his dam was Camatross. Magical Mike's sire was Tyler B., and his dam was Racing Date; Camatross' sire was Albatross, and her dam was Bye Bye Camille.

== Background ==
Gallo Blue Chip was purchased by his owner, Martin Scharf, for $100,000 from Chris Oakes of Lockport, New York. He was bred by Dan Gernatt Farms in Collins, New York.

== Career ==
Gallo Blue Chip won eight of eight starts in 1999, including seven New York Sires Stakes and the $150,000 championship. In 2000, Gallo Blue Chip won the Meadowlands Pace horse race at the Meadowlands Racetrack in New Jersey with a time of 1:50.4. The same year, he also won the Breeder's Crown Three-Year-Old Colt and Gelding Pace at Mohawk Racetrack in 1:51.1. Winning the North America Cup (1:50.1; $1 million), Tattersalls Pace, and Art Rooney Pace were additional major victories for him that year. He set the world record for three-year-old pacers on a 5/8 mile track in his win at the Little Brown Jug Preview with a time of 1:50, becoming World Champion.

Gallo Blue Chip's owner, Martin Scharf, described his feelings about the horse's North America Cup victory, saying, "Winning the North America Cup was a thrill and a relief. Even if you know a horse is good, he has to prove it. I've been in this business for 10 years and you never really know if you have that caliber of a horse. The horse's trainer, Mark Ford, said of him in July 2000, "He's a little hard to train. You won't be impressed if you train him in the middle of the week, but he is good when he races."

He was a great horse - a big horse. If you sat behind him and he was going slow you would never think that he was a great horse. He felt like a horse with not a lot, but when you got him going there was nothing like him. He was so powerful in the Meadowlands Pace and especially the Jug Preview. Those are the races that I will always remember most. In the Jug Preview, he was parked the whole mile. You know, not many horses can do that, and the way he did it is very hard to describe. (Daniel Dube, February 21, 2008)

At the close of 2000, Gallo Blue Chip had won more than $2.4 million, becoming the Standardbred record holder for winning the most money in any single racing season. Gallo Blue Chip won additional awards early in his career, including being named 2000 American Harness Horse of the Year; and 2000 and 2001 Pacer of the Year in the United States and Canada. He also won the United States Trotting Association and Canadian (O’Brien) Three-Year-Old Pacing Colt of the Year awards in 2000.

Gallo Blue Chip became the all-time leading money-winning pacer in 2001 with $3,227,861 by winning the Canadian Pacing Derby Prep. That year, he won 10 out of 19 starts, including the Battle of Lake Erie, Graduate Pace, Canadian Pacing Derby, and American-National. He was the first pacer in the history of harness racing to earn more than $4 million in winnings, having done so in 2003 as a six-year-old at the Presidential Series final.

As an eight-year-old in 2005, he was continuing to race prior to his retirement on March 12, 2005. In 2005, Gallo Blue Chip retired "as the sport's leading money winning pacer" and Standardbred gelding of all-time. He is the first horse to have won more than $4 million in the sport.

Gallo Blue Chip was inducted into the Harness Racing Hall of Fame on July 3, 2011, having received 34% of the votes from members in good standing of the United States Trotting Association. He had a total of 53 wins of 133 starts during his career.

== Retirement and death ==
Gallo Blue Chip was retired to Blue Chip Farms in Wallkill, New York. He died on January 22, 2025, at the age of 28.

== Pedigree ==
Pedigree of Gallo Blue Chip (USA), Standardbred bay, 1997
| Sire Magical Mike 1991 p,2,1:51.4; p,3,1:50.2 $1,682,08 World Champion at 2 | Tyler B. (1977) p,2,1:57.4; p,3,1:55.1, $687,338 | Most Happy Fella (1967) p,3,T1:55, $419,033 | Meadow Skipper (1960) p,3,1:55.1, $428,057 |
| Sire Magical Mike 1991 p,2,1:51.4; p,3,1:50.2 $1,682,08 World Champion at 2 | Tyler B. (1977) p,2,1:57.4; p,3,1:55.1, $687,338 | Most Happy Fella (1967) p,3,T1:55, $419,033 | Laughing Girl (1961) p,4,2:04h $19,546 |
| Sire Magical Mike 1991 p,2,1:51.4; p,3,1:50.2 $1,682,08 World Champion at 2 | Tyler B. (1977) p,2,1:57.4; p,3,1:55.1, $687,338 | Tarport Cheer (1966) p,3,2:08.3 | Tar Heel (1948) p,4,T1:57m $119,148 |
| Sire Magical Mike 1991 p,2,1:51.4; p,3,1:50.2 $1,682,08 World Champion at 2 | Tyler B. (1977) p,2,1:57.4; p,3,1:55.1, $687,338 | Tarport Cheer (1966) p,3,2:08.3 | Meadow Cheer (1956) p,2,2:05h $16,083 |
| Sire Magical Mike 1991 p,2,1:51.4; p,3,1:50.2 $1,682,08 World Champion at 2 | Racing Date (1977) p,3,T1:57.2, $18,865 | Race Time (1961) p,3,1:57, $486,955 | Good Time (1946) p,1:57.4m $318,792 |
| Sire Magical Mike 1991 p,2,1:51.4; p,3,1:50.2 $1,682,08 World Champion at 2 | Racing Date (1977) p,3,T1:57.2, $18,865 | Race Time (1961) p,3,1:57, $486,955 | Breath O Spring (1953) p,3,T2:01.1 $3,144 |
| Sire Magical Mike 1991 p,2,1:51.4; p,3,1:50.2 $1,682,08 World Champion at 2 | Racing Date (1977) p,3,T1:57.2, $18,865 | Tarport Martha p,2,2:06.2f, $1,009 | OBrien Hanover (1955) p,6,1:59.2m $302,255 |
| Sire Magical Mike 1991 p,2,1:51.4; p,3,1:50.2 $1,682,08 World Champion at 2 | Racing Date (1977) p,3,T1:57.2, $18,865 | Tarport Martha p,2,2:06.2f, $1,009 | Adios Betty (1951) p,2,T1:58.4m $34,171 |
| Dam Camatross 1981 | Albatross (1968) p,4,1:54.3 | Meadow Skipper (1960) p,3,1:55.1, $428,057 | Dale Frost (1951) p,1:58m $204,117 |
| Dam Camatross 1981 | Albatross (1968) p,4,1:54.3 | Meadow Skipper (1960) p,3,1:55.1, $428,057 | Countess Vivian (1950) p,3,1:59m $43,262 |
| Dam Camatross 1981 | Albatross (1968) p,4,1:54.3 | Voodoo Hanover (1964) | Dancer Hanover (1957) p,4,T1:56.4m $87,746 |
| Dam Camatross 1981 | Albatross (1968) p,4,1:54.3 | Voodoo Hanover (1964) | Vibrant Hanover (1960) |
| Dam Camatross 1981 | Bye Bye Camille (1974) | Bye Bye Byrd (1955) p,T1:56.1, $554,272 | Polar Byrd (1944) p,T1:59.3m $69,300 |
| Dam Camatross 1981 | Bye Bye Camille (1974) | Bye Bye Byrd (1955) p,T1:56.1, $554,272 | Evalina Hanover (1946) p,1:59.2m $12,420 |
| Dam Camatross 1981 | Bye Bye Camille (1974) | Cathy J. Hanover (1959) p,3,2:02h $76,557 | Tar Heel (1948) p,4,T1:57m $119,148 |
| Dam Camatross 1981 | Bye Bye Camille (1974) | Cathy J. Hanover (1959) p,3,2:02h $76,557 | Kaola Hanover (1949) p,4,2:05.3h $14,600 |
