= Dan Gernatt Farms =

American family business

- Type: Privately held family business
- Industry: agriculture, dairy farming, horse breeding and racing
- Founded: Collins, New York (1938)
- Founder: Daniel R. Gernatt, Sr. and Flavia C. (Schmitz) Gernatt
- Headquarters: Collins, New York, United States of America
- Area served: Western New York
- Key people: Daniel R. Gernatt, Sr.; Flavia C. (Schmitz) Gernatt; Russell Rebmann
- Products: Dairy cows; standardbred horses
- Owner: Daniel R. Gernatt, Sr.; Flavia C. (Schmitz) Gernatt

Dan Gernatt Farms is a dairy farming, and horse breeding and racing enterprise, located in the Western New York town of Collins. Daniel R. Gernatt, Sr. and Flavia C. (Schmitz) Gernatt co-owned and established Dan Gernatt Farms in 1938. They built up their farming business, being recognized in the 1950s as having the largest milking dairy herd in Erie County.

In the 1960s, the Gernatt's transitioned their dairy farming business to one of breeding and racing Standardbred horses with the purchase of Lieutenant Gray. Many of the Gernatt's harness racing horses had the last name, 'Collins,' reflecting the locale in which they were born. Among some of the Gernatt's top money-winning horses were Gallo Blue Chip, Bye Tsem (formerly Holden S. Collins), Vernon Blue Chip, Roz T. Collins, Adios Bob, Sir Taurus, Lotto S. Collins, and Elitist.

The Gernatt's established themselves in horse breeding and harness racing throughout a period of three decades, and wound down their horse business in the mid-1990s.

== Dairy farming ==
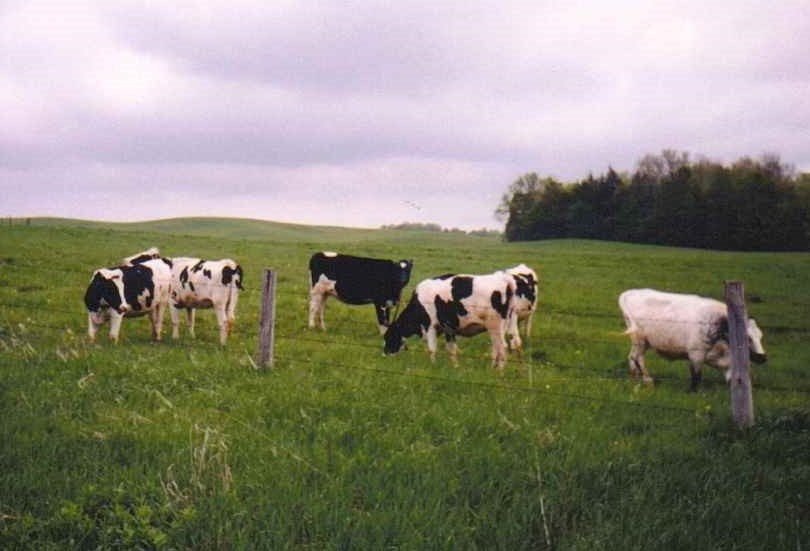
Dairy cows

Dan Gernatt Dairy Farms was established in 1938 by Daniel R. Gernatt, Sr., and Flavia C. (Schmitz) Gernatt in Collins, New York. In the 1950s, the dairy farming enterprise was recognized as the largest in Erie County. As Gernatt's farming business expanded, it was later known as Dan Gernatt Farms. The Gernatt's left dairy farming in the 1960s. Hauling grain as a result of the farming enterprise led to trucking sand and gravel from the Gernatt's property, thus leading to the establishment of the Gernatt Family of Companies, now a group of 11 mining companies, headquartered in Collins.

== Horse breeding and harness racing ==
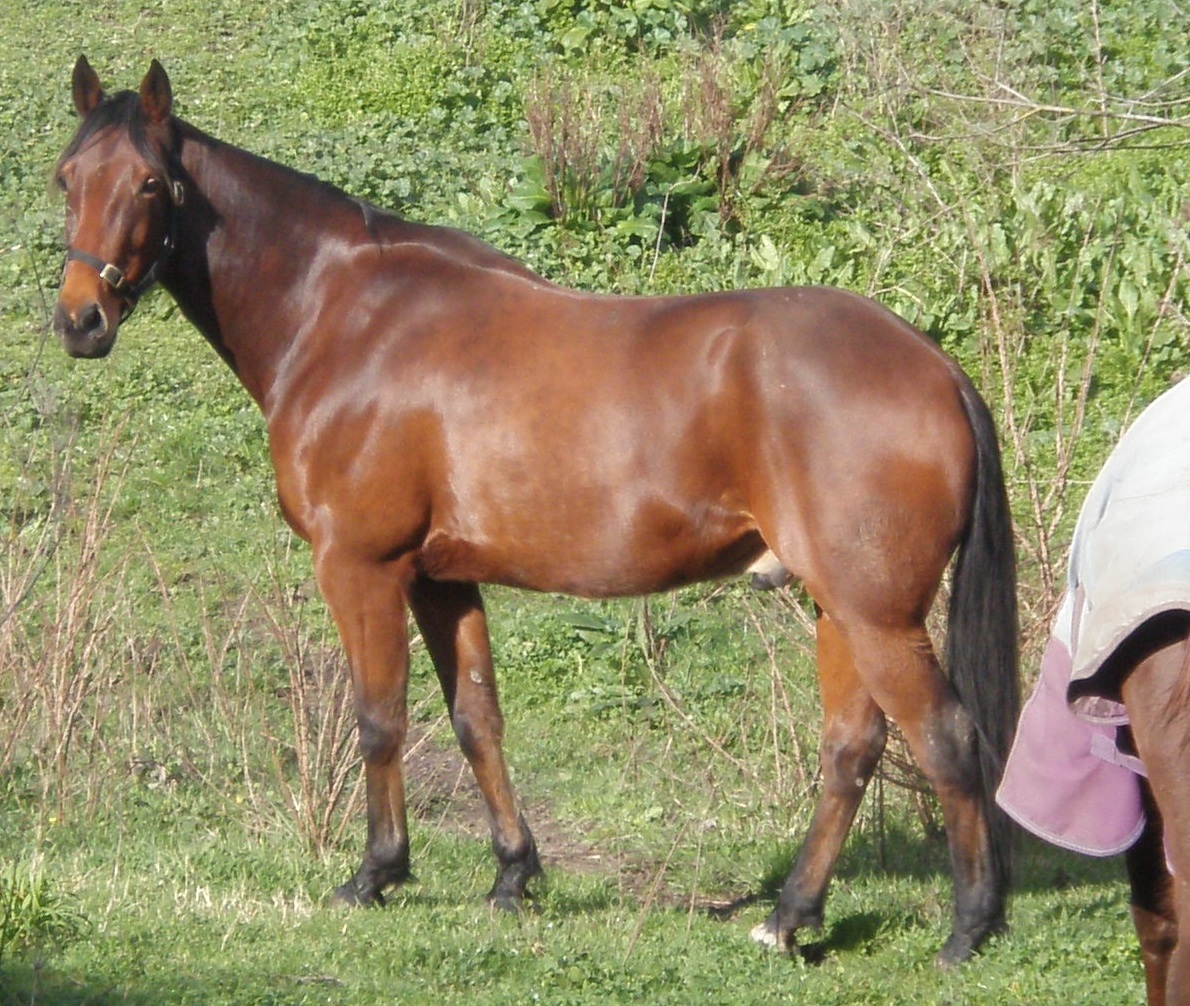
A standardbred horse

=== Background ===
The Gernatt's partnered with each other in breeding and racing Standardbred horses, beginning in 1960. The harness racing horses were known throughout New York State, New Jersey, and Ontario, Canada. During a golfing vacation to Pinehurst, North Carolina in 1962, Daniel R. Gernatt, Sr. bought a half-interest in Lieutenant Gray for $2,750. The horse's good racing performance caused Gernatt to purchase brood mares with foals shortly thereafter, thus beginning the Gernatt's horse breeding and racing ventures. The Gernatt's established themselves in horse breeding and harness racing throughout a period of three decades.

=== New York horse breeding program ===
During the 1970s and the 1980s, the Gernatt family was active in horse breeding. In 1984, the Gernatt's horse business included "250 mares, stallions, young stock and race horses; a training facility on Mile Strip Road in the Town of Brant; a broodmare barn in North Collins; a second farm in the town of Dayton;" and stallion barns in Collins. At that time, the Gernatt's had sold more than 1,000 Standardbred horses with the last name Collins, so dubbed for the town in which they were born. Dan Gernatt's grandson, Russell Rebmann, partnered in overseeing operations. Chuck Scibetta trained the horses and Dave Vance was the driver at various horse racing tracks.

In a 1984 Buffalo News article written by Harlan C. Abbey, Daniel R. Gernatt, Sr. is quoted, stating about his horse breeding interests:

You can't keep every horse you think will be a good trotter or pacer for your own stable. If you sell horses, you have to be pleased when they win for other owners. And you have to keep upgrading your stock...I like to keep the first foal of any mare in our racing stable. That way it'll get the best care we know how to give it, the best training. Then, if it doesn't turn out to be a good race horse, maybe we'll sell the mare...I get partial to a filly every once in awhile that we keep for the broodmare band.

=== New York Sires Stakes circuit ===
In the New York Sires Stakes circuit, the Gernatt's broodmare herd produced champions such as Gallo Blue Chip, with $4.2 million in total winnings; Bye Tsem (formerly known as Holden S. Collins) ($515,194), Vernon Blue Chip ($542,816), and Roz T. Collins ($410,653) were the top trotters. In 2000, Gallo Blue Chip won the Meadowlands Pace horse race at the Meadowlands Racetrack in New Jersey with a time of 1:50.4. The same year, he also won the Breeder's Crown Three-Year-Old Colt and Gelding Pace at Mohawk Racetrack in 1:51.1. In 2005, Gallo Blue Chip retired "as the sport's leading money winning pacer." In 1994, Bye Tsem raced in the second division of the Hambletonian Stakes. In 1982, Roz T. Collins placed third in the Hambletonian Stakes at the Meadowlands Racetrack. Gernatt's horses also raced at the Buffalo Raceway, Syracuse Mile, Vernon Downs, Pompano, Greenwood Raceway in Toronto, and Brandywine in Yonkers. At the Yonkers Raceway in 1999, the Dan Gernatt Farms Pace for three-year-old fillies was held on the 10th annual New York Night of Champions.

=== Sir Taurus ===
The Gernatt's were Sir Taurus' co-breeders, and stood him as stud for four years before he went to Blue Chip Farms in 1992. As of 1989, Sir Taurus' winnings were $484,810, after racing only in 1986 and 1987. Sir Taurus was co-holder of a world record for three-year-old colt trotters on a half-mile track with a time of 1:57.2h; and had set six track records throughout New York State at that time. Sir Taurus' trainer and driver was Jimmy Takter. An easygoing horse with a gentle nature, Sir Taurus turned 30 in 2014 and remains at Blue Chip Farms, now retired, providing school children and scouts with opportunities to visit him. Of Sir Taurus' nearly 700 offspring, Approved Action earned the most in winnings with $715,676. Sir Taurus' offspring have earned $23.7 million in combined winnings. Of all offspring of Sir Taurus (with Amanda T. Collins, a daughter of Texas), Red Hot Blue Chip sold for the most money at $52,000 in 1999. The Yonkers Raceway annually holds the Sir Taurus Trot for Standardbred harness racing.

=== Elitist ===
The Gernatt's also sponsored the privately held $100,000 Elitist Cup from 1987 to 1992. The races were to benefit those horses sired by Elitist when he was held as stud by Dan Gernatt Farms. Elitist was another stallion owned by the Gernatt's, producing some top race times that included 1:56.1; 1:55.3; and 1:54.3. In only two years of racing in the late 1980s, Elitist won $249,363. Elitist was sire to several of the Gernatt's horses, including Walt Collins (1:56.3); Tru Elitist (1:55.4); and Bonny Brook Elitist (1:56.1). Elitist's foals were also eligible to be included in the $12 million New York Sires Program at that time.

=== Other notable horses ===
There were other notable horses that the Gernatt's owned, as well. Adios Bob earned $330,364 in five years of racing. Texas was a stallion that stood as stud for Gernatt, being syndicated for $1 million. Inflation Collins, Jolly Roger, Dallas T. Collins, Most Happy Fella (1967) (1:55) ($419,033), What Wheel, and Lotto S. Collins (1:55.4) ($273,055) were also popular horses of the Gernatt's.

=== Horse sales ===
In 1984, Daniel R. Gernatt, Sr. stated that all of the horses that were part of Dan Gernatt Farms were for sale. By 1994, he stated that horse racing was "no longer economically viable." He stated that a horse from his farm needed to be sold for at least $4,000 in order to break even, and many horses were not being sold for that amount. Additionally, he referenced that the purse for racing a horse at the Buffalo Raceway had decreased from $1,200 to $1,000 from the 1960s to the 1990s. In 1994, the Gernatt's were making the last of their horse sales, winding down their horse business.

=== Industry ranking ===
Dan Gernatt Farms was ranked 59th in the industry in 1995. It was ranked 43rd in North America in 1996 by the United States Trotting Association, being identified with receiving $758,010 in winnings from horse races.

== Legal issues ==
In 1976, the Iroquois Gas Corporation sued Dan Gernatt Farms for an underground gas storage violation pursuant to laws protecting rights of Native American lands.
