= Flavia C. Gernatt =

American businesswoman, horsewoman and dairy farmer

- Born: April 2, 1921; Langford, New York, United States
- Died: November 27, 1995 (aged 74); Collins, New York, United States
- Occupations: Co-Founder, Gernatt Family of Companies and Dan Gernatt Farms
- Spouse: Daniel R. Gernatt Sr.

Flavia C. Gernatt (April 2, 1921 – November 27, 1995) (née Flavia C. Schmitz) was an American businesswoman, horsewoman, and dairy farmer in Collins, New York. With her husband Daniel R. Gernatt Sr., she was co-owner of Dan Gernatt Farms, and co-founder of Dan Gernatt Gravel Products, which was the beginning of the Gernatt Family of Companies.

== Career ==
=== Dan Gernatt Farms ===
==== Dairy farming ====
In 1938 Flavia married Daniel R. Gernatt Sr., and in Collins, New York, the two began a dairy farming enterprise, Dan Gernatt Farms, which in the 1950s was the largest in Erie County.

==== Horse breeding and harness racing ====
Gernatt partnered with her husband in breeding and racing Standardbred horses, beginning in 1960.

=== Gernatt Family of Companies ===
With her husband, Gernatt cofounded Dan Gernatt Gravel Products, headquartered in Collins, New York, after World War II. She served as vice president and secretary of the company; was secretary of Gernatt Asphalt Products and Country Side Sand and Gravel; and was a director of each of those companies. The companies are part of the Gernatt Family of Companies.

In 2005 a 225-acre man-made lake was created on Countryside Sand and Gravel land, named Lake Flavia. A portion of the lake is open to public fishing.

== Philanthropy ==
In 1988, Gernatt and her husband established the Daniel and Flavia Gernatt Family Foundation, a charity which provides financial assistance to organizations and entities in Western New York, mostly in the areas of education, healthcare, Christian-related endeavors, and to those in need or who are homeless. In 1992 Gernatt and her husband donated the construction of a new rectory to St. Joseph Parish in Gowanda, where they were active members and benefactors, and where Flavia was a lay eucharistic minister.

== Background and personal life ==
Gernatt was born on April 2, 1921, in Langford, New York. She had a son, Daniel R. Gernatt Jr., who is the chief executive officer of the Gernatt Family of Companies; and two daughters Gernatt died in 1995 following a six-month illness.
