= Gernatt Asphalt Products, Inc. v. Town of Sardinia =

Appeal against municipal zoning laws in New York

- Court: New York Court of Appeals
- Full case name: In the Matter of Gernatt Asphalt Products, Inc. v. Town of Sardinia et al.
- Decided: March 28, 1996
- Citations: 87 N.Y.2d 668; 664 N.E.2d 1226; 642 N.Y.S.2d 164

Case history
- Appealed from: 208 A.D.2d 139, 622 N.Y.S.2d 395 (1995)

Court membership
- Judges sitting: Judith S. Kaye, Richard D. Simons, Vito J. Titone, Joseph W. Bellacosa, George Bundy Smith, Howard A. Levine, Carmen Beauchamp Ciparick

Case opinions
- Decision by: Simons

Gernatt Asphalt Products, Inc. v. Town of Sardinia, 87 N.Y.2d 668, 664 N.E.2d 1226, 642 N.Y.S.2d 164 (1996), was an appeal against municipal zoning laws in New York and whether they were addressed by New York State's Mined Land Reclamation Law, decided in the New York Court of Appeals.

== Background ==
In 1991, opposition to mining proposed by Gernatt Asphalt Products, Inc. became obvious in the Town of Sardinia, New York when a mining overlay was passed to the town's zoning laws, showing areas acceptable for mining. The mining overlay was voided by court action, but later upheld. The owner of the privately held Water Works there informed residents that should mining occur, the water company would go out of business; about 70 residents would be affected.

In 1993, the Town Board passed an amendment to its zoning ordinance, providing it with regulatory control of new mining. The amendment was ruled by the State Court of Appeals to be a proper exercise of authority by the Town Board. Regarding the Town Board's belief that mining was occurring on the former Gabel-Thomas property purchased by Gernatt's, Sardinia Town Attorney Anthony DiFillippo, III, stated, "We will bring to the attention of the court that mining is being conducted in violation of state law."

Gernatt Asphalt Products, Inc. filed with the New York State Department of Environmental Conservation (DEC) in 1993 for a 100-year mining permit for a 400-acre Gabel-Thomas tract of land it purchased near Chaffee, New York in the Town of Sardinia. The Erie County Farm Bureau and the Erie County Legislature also took issue with the proposed mining due to the DEC's 4-inch thick report that the environment would be significantly affected. The Erie County Legislature offered the services of the county attorney to the Town of Sardinia in the matter. The DEC's Environmental Impact Statement reported that a 276-acre lake would be created throughout the 100-year period due to mining operations. By 1994, the companies had spent more than $1,000,000 to obtain the mining permit.

In 1995, Judge Fallon for the New York State Appellate Court decided that the Town of Sardinia's Prohibition of Mining Amendments be nullified, that the Town did not act according to its Comprehensive Plan, and that the Town's rezoning was impermissibly exclusionary.

== Brief summary ==
In 1996, Gernatt Asphalt Products, Inc. v. Town of Sardinia, Gernatt Asphalt Products, Inc. challenged the Town of Sardinia when the Town Board rezoned, in part, excluding that piece of land. Residents were concerned that the town's ground water supply would be affected by the expansion of the corporation's mining operations when the DEC informed the town of the company's desire to use the land for mining.

Despite the lawsuit, the Town Zoning Board granted Gernatt Asphalt Products, Inc. a variance for mining after winning the case that involved more than 10 years of legal battles; the Town Zoning Board was sued by the Town Board. Gernatt Asphalt Products, Inc. offered $200,000 to the Water Works there if the Town Board would drop its lawsuit against the Town Zoning Board. An offer was presented to the Town Board in 1997 by New York State Assistant Attorney General Paul McCarthy, who also represents the New York State DEC, for Dennis Vacco, an attorney and former New York State Attorney General, to mediate the dispute, which the Town Board unanimously rejected.

Interests of the companies in the dispute are to mine the land that was purchased, and the Town of Sardinia seeks to retain its rights regarding mining control within the town, as upheld by the New York State Court of Appeals, and to maintain the best interests of the citizen majority.

=== Appellant ===
Gernatt Asphalt Products, Inc. is a mining company that is part of the Gernatt Family of Companies, headquartered in Collins, New York. The company was founded by Daniel R. Gernatt, Sr. in 1961.

=== Court's holding ===
The New York State Court of Appeals decided that local zoning laws were not included in the New York State's Mined Land Reclamation Law, and that the Town of Sardinia did not violate Open Meetings Law. Therefore, municipalities in New York State maintain the right to exercise reasonable police powers to completely prevent mining.

== Later actions ==
In 1998, attorneys for Gernatt Asphalt Products were met at the New York Supreme Court by the Town of Sardinia's attorneys and an attorney for the DEC after Gernatt's requested a new hearing to obtain a DEC permit to mine in Sardinia. The mining permit was originally denied by the DEC in 1993, and the company sought to pre-date the permit in order that it would precede both the original permit denial and the Town's new laws banning mining. By 1998, the company had spent more than $5,000,000 to obtain the permit. In 2007, the Town's Zoning Appeals Board granted the company a mining permit after 14 years of legal battles by the Town's Board.
