= Gowanda State Hospital =

- Erie County, State of New York

Geography
- Location: Gowanda, New York, United States
- Coordinates: 42°29′18″N 78°56′13″W

Organization
- Type: Specialist
- Specialty: Psychiatric hospital

History
- Former names: Homeopathic State Hospital, Gowanda Psychiatric Center
- Opened: 1894
- Closed: 2021

Links
- Lists: Hospitals in New York State

Gowanda State Hospital was a hospital located in Gowanda, New York. Its building is now part of Gowanda Correctional Facility.

== History ==
In 1894, the Erie County Legislature passed an Act that gave rise to the Homeopathic State Hospital, later known as the Gowanda Psychiatric Center, in Gowanda and Collins, New York. Land purchased for the State Hospital by Erie County included 500 acres and was known as the Taylor Tract. When the State Care Act was effected in 1894, the land was transferred to the State of New York, which then conveyed it to the State Hospital. The hospital was located Taylor Hollow Road, which was named for the farmer who used to own the land.

In 1982, 40% of the original 500 acres of the Gowanda Psychiatric Center was utilized for the Collins Correctional Facility. The Gowanda Correctional Facility was built using the remaining acreage and opened its doors in 1994. The two prisons are separated by a fence, and they are administered independently. Gowanda Correctional Facility houses more than 2,300 inmates, and is the second-largest prison in New York State.
