= Zoar, New York =

Hamlet in New York, United States

Coordinates: 42°27′24″N 78°50′21″W

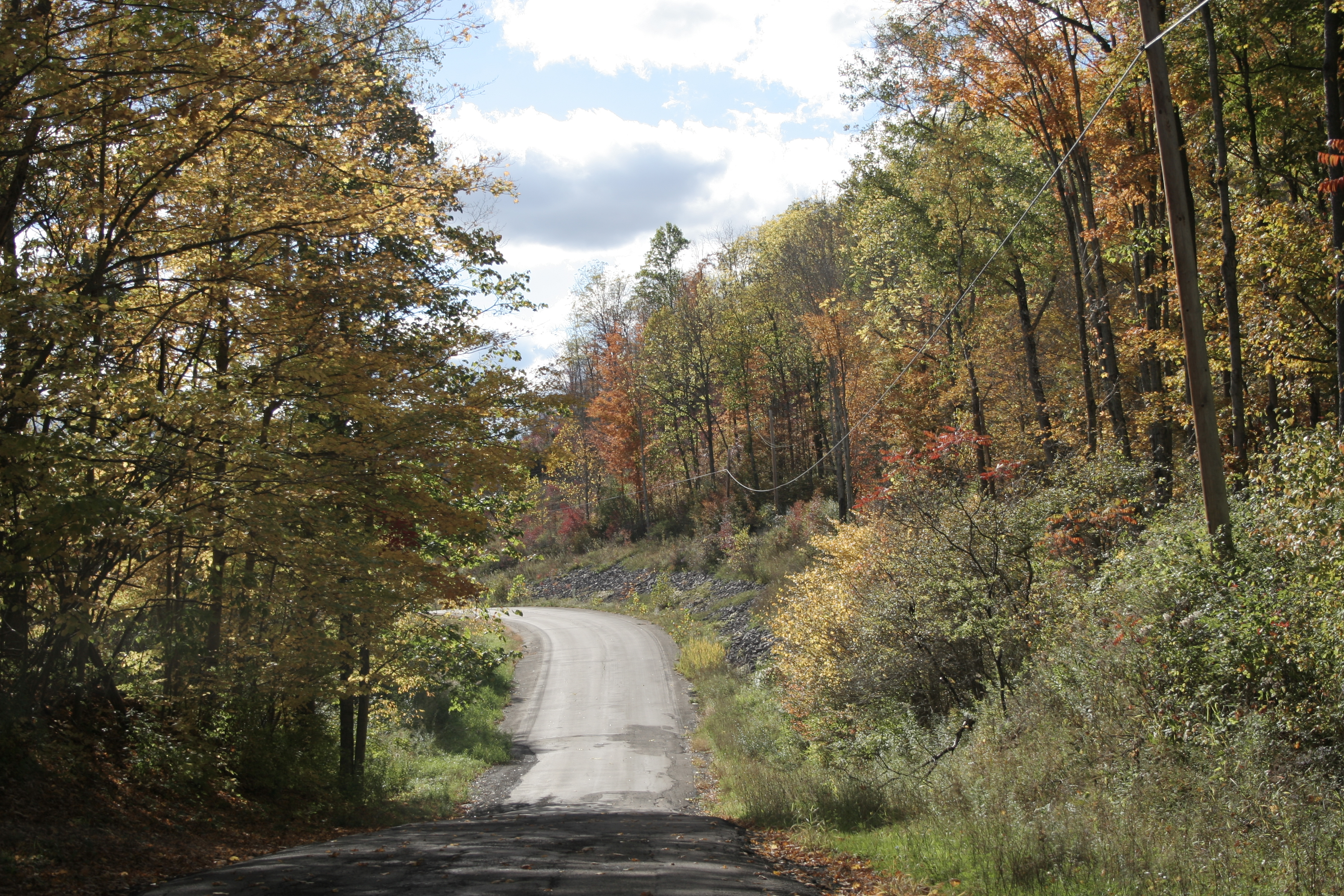
Zoar Valley Road

Zoar is a hamlet in the town of Collins in Erie County, New York, United States. Though it is in Collins, mail is postmarked to the Gowanda ZIP code of 14070. It is located on the northern side of Zoar Valley.

== History ==
The area was first inhabited during the Stone Age by Algonquians, a nomadic people. An Algonkian mound from the first or second Stone Age is located on a farm in the area of Rosenburg along Zoar in Gowanda. The mound is believed to be about 3,500 years old, with artifacts including spearheads, copper heads, and stone implements of a crude nature having been excavated from the site.

A little-known fact about the area, not written in any history books and known only to some locals, is that it was a station in the Underground Railroad. A functional tunnel of the Underground Railroad, still in existence today, connects a former train drop-off area of the New York and Lake Erie Railroads near the foot of Gowanda-Zoar Road to an outlet on the property formerly owned by William and Evelyn (Merrill) Glazier, a local surgeon and nurse. Located on Gowanda-Zoar Road, the home was used as a safe house for former slaves escaping to free states and Canada from Southern states around the 1860s and the time of the American Civil War. A homemade railroad sign is posted on the property at the location of the tunnel's outlet.

Notable within the Zoar area are maple trees that are approximately 200–300 years old. Many of these trees are located along South Quaker Street and Vail Road. Each spring for decades, the trees have been tapped by locals in order to make maple syrup and maple sugar candy. Several of the trees have become diseased and have died in recent years, with some having to be cut down. Others were cut by the Highway Department when South Quaker Street was repaved and realigned with the section crossing Gowanda-Zoar Road that connects it to Vail Road around 1990–1995.

== Community ==
The Zoar community includes many homes and families living throughout a hilly area with pastures, fields, woods, ponds, and open land. Some residents own farms with dairy cows, horses, and other animals; other residents own homes and property that does not include a farm or farmland.

== Notable businesses ==
For many years, the area tree nursery company, Congdon and Weller Nurseries, owned fields in the area and grew trees, shrubs, and other plants and crops there. Presently and for several decades, the farming company, Capella Farms, has operated on South Quaker Street.

On the Vail Road section of Zoar, an excavation site operated by the Gernatt Family of Companies is present. In 2013, residents of the area expressed concerns about changes to the natural environment, the water table, wells, and springs due to a proposed mining expansion by the companies on the site. Most residents in the area get their water from wells or springs, so there is understandable concern about the companies' proposed mining expansion there that would affect the water supply.

Reid's Harley-Davidson Motorcycle Shop, a private, family-owned business, has operated on Gowanda-Zoar Road for decades. The shop is a popular stop for bikers from around the United States and Canada.

== See also ==
- Collins, New York
- Gowanda, New York
