= Kayla Mendoza =

American woman convicted of DUI manslaughter (born 1992)

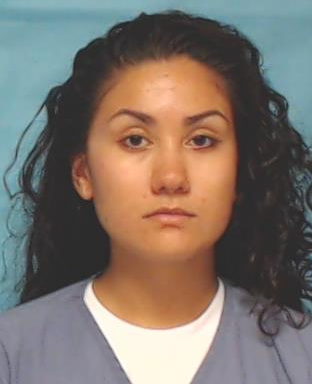
- Inmate mugshot c. 2015
- Born: December 25, 1992 (age 33); U.S.
- Occupation: Employee at T-Mobile US
- Known for: "2 drunk 2 care"
- Status: Incarcerated
- Conviction: DUI manslaughter (2 counts)
- Penalty: 24 years in prison plus six years of probation and a permanent ban from operating a motor vehicle.

Kayla Mendoza is an American woman who was sentenced to 24 years in prison in 2015 after being convicted of killing two women while driving drunk in Coral Springs, Florida, on November 17, 2013. She was 20 years old and not licensed to drive at the time. Mendoza tweeted "2 drunk 2 care" hours before the fatal accident.

Mendoza was born in Miami, Florida, and attended Hallandale High School. She later lived in Coconut Creek, Florida.

== Crash and sentence ==
On the night of November 16, 2013, Mendoza, who was 20 years old at the time, went with her manager and co-workers from her job at a T-Mobile US store to the Tijuana Taxi Co., a local bar in Coral Springs, where she reportedly drank two "fishbowl" margaritas. Hours later, she got into a Hyundai Sonata and drove into the Sawgrass Expressway the wrong way at 80 mph before colliding with a 2012 Toyota Camry driven by Kaitlyn Ferrante and Marisa Catronio, both aged 21, just after 1:45 a.m. on November 17. Catronio was instantly killed in the crash while Ferrante died in the hospital days later. Mendoza broke both legs in the crash and used a wheelchair for over a year. She was charged with two counts of DUI manslaughter while impaired, two counts of DUI manslaughter with an unlawful blood-alcohol level (a BAC of .15), two counts of vehicular homicide, and two counts of driving without a license, causing death.

Hours before the crash, Mendoza posted: "2 drunk 2 care" on her Twitter account. She had proclaimed herself as a "pothead princess" on her account and posted quotes indicating her addiction to alcohol and marijuana, such as: "My car permanently smells like weed" and "I really am so baked right now". Mendoza's then-boyfriend Javier Reyes, who owned the Hyundai Sonata involved in the crash, explained that the "2 drunk 2 care" tweet was directed toward him.

The families of Ferrante and Catronio filed lawsuits against Mendoza, Reyes, The Tijuana Taxi Co., and the T-Mobile store where Mendoza was employed.

On May 4, 2015, two months after pleading guilty of two DUI manslaughter charges, Mendoza was sentenced to 24 years in prison. In addition, she will serve six years of probation after her sentence and she is permanently banned from driving a motor vehicle.

== Aftermath ==
Gary Catronio and his wife founded Marisa's Way, named after their daughter. Marisa's Way aims to educate teenagers on the consequences of drunk or distracted driving.

== See also ==
- Darion Conner, sentenced to and serving 15 years in prison for vehicular homicide with a BAC of .27
- John B. Goodman, sentenced to and serving 16 years in prison, for vehicular homicide with a BAC of .17
- Bruce Kimball, sentenced to 17 years in prison, served less than five years, for vehicular homicide with a BAC of .20
- Sean Ludwick, sentenced to 3–9 years in plea deal and served 5; convicted of vehicular homicide, BAC of .18 two hours later
