= Gowanda Village Historic District =

Historic district in New York, United States

- U.S. National Register of Historic Places
- U.S. Historic district
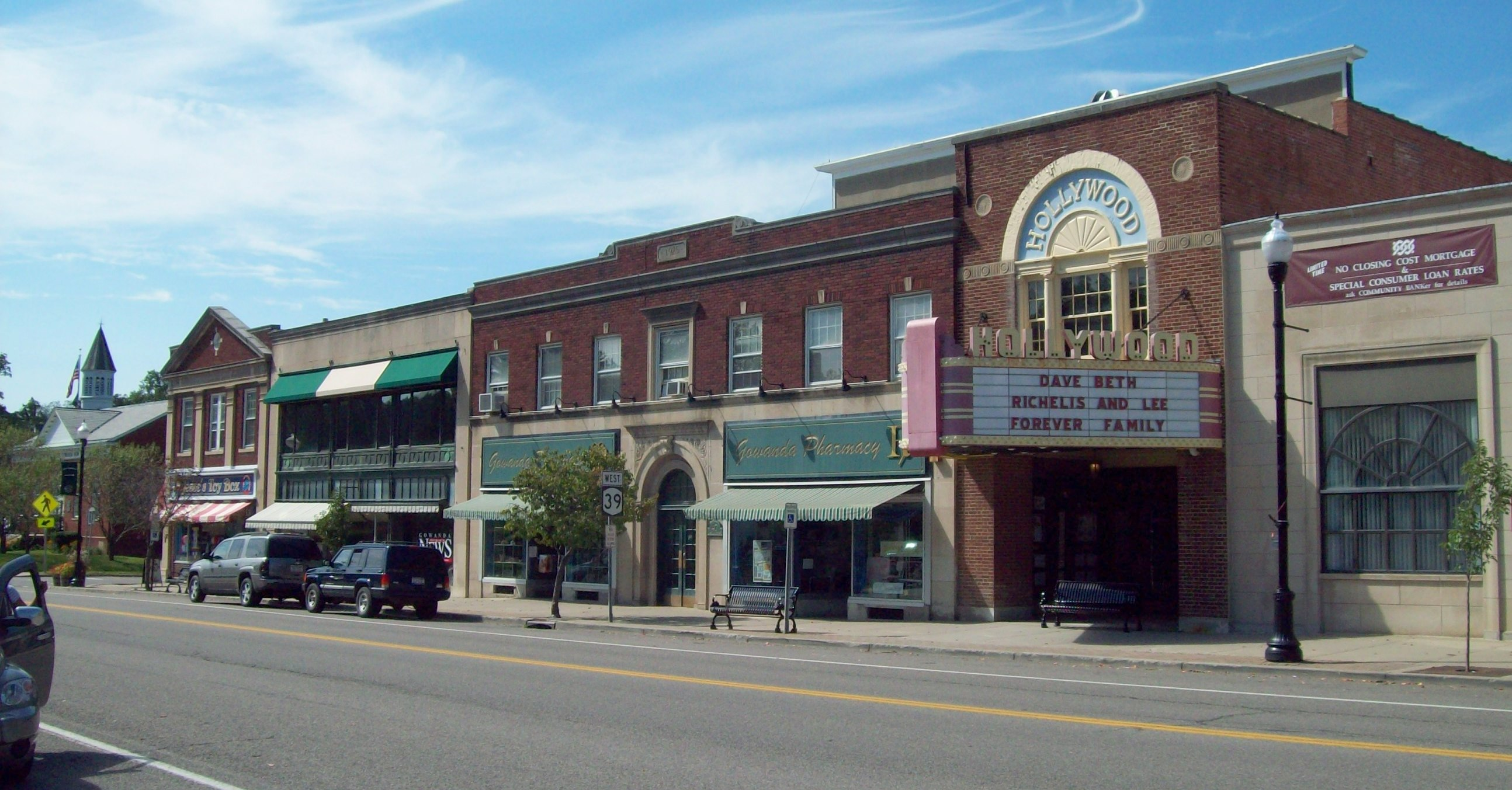
- Gowanda Village Historic District, August 2010

- Location within New York Location within the United States
- Location: 37, 39, 41-45, 47-49, and 53 W. Main St., Gowanda, New York
- Coordinates: 42°27′47″N 78°56′12″W
- Built: 1925
- Architect: Rapp, George & Cornelius W.; Et al.
- Architectural style: Late 19th And 20th Century Revivals, Classical Revival, Italian Renaissance
- NRHP reference No.: 86002691
- Added to NRHP: September 22, 1986

Gowanda Village Historic District is a historic district located at Gowanda in Cattaraugus County, New York. The district encompasses five early 20th century commercial buildings constructed 1925–1926. The Neoclassical style structures housed the Gowanda Cooperative Savings and Loan Association, Hollywood Theater, U.S. Post Office, and Gowanda's first department store.

It was listed on the National Register of Historic Places in 1986.
