= Sean Ludwick =

American real estate developer and felon

- Born: Sean P. Ludwick; 1972/1973 (53–54 years old); Manhattan, New York City, US
- Education: the University of Rhode Island; the University of Pennsylvania's Wharton School
- Occupation: real estate developer
- Employer: Black House Development
- Criminal charges: aggravated vehicular homicide, leaving the scene of an accident that resulted in a death, and; aggravated driving while intoxicated
- Criminal penalty: three to nine years in prison
- Criminal status: Guilty.; Served five years in prison.; Released on January 12, 2022.; On parole until January 12, 2025
- Children: 2 sons

Sean P. Ludwick (born 1972/1973) is an American real estate developer. He is the founder and managing partner of Black House Development, a residential development firm. He was convicted in 2017 of aggravated vehicular homicide, leaving the scene of an accident that resulted in a death, and aggravated driving while intoxicated.

== Early and personal life ==
Ludwick is from Manhattan, in New York City, was raised in Nassau County, New York, and split his time between a townhouse on Sutton Place in Manhattan and a house in Bridgehampton, New York. His father is from Flatbush in Brooklyn, New York, his mother is from Peru, and he speaks Spanish.

Ludwick earned a bachelor's degree from the University of Rhode Island, and an MBA from the University of Pennsylvania's Wharton School. From 1994 to 1997, he worked as an associate at Andersen Consulting; he later worked as an associate at Deutsche Bank, at RWO Acquisitions, and as a manager for WCI Communities.

He has two sons. His wife filed for divorce in 2016. He enjoys painting as a hobby, including painting murals. On September 9, 2015, 10 days after he crashed his car in a hit-and-run in which his passenger died, he put his Bridgehampton property, as well as his Manhattan Sutton Place townhouse, into the names of limited liability corporations. He reportedly had assets of $20 million when he entered prison. In 2021 his wife sold the Sutton Place townhouse. He lives in Bridgehampton, New York, in a 5,884-square-foot (546.6 m^{2}) home.

== Real estate career ==
Ludwick is a real estate developer.

In 2007 he founded and became managing partner of Manhattan-based firm Black House Development. Joining him at Black House were a former classmate of his from the University of Pennsylvania, and a contractor.

The residential development firm has built luxury condos and hotels. Included among them are the 56-room Hotel Americano overlooking the High Line in Manhattan, and a residential tower near the High Line in which every unit has 20-foot (6 meter) ceilings, outsize windows, and a private swimming pool.

In 2010 he developed 580 Carroll Street in the Park Slope neighborhood of Brooklyn, New York, a 17-unit five-story building designed by architect Enrique Norten.

In 2013, Black House was planning to build two luxury buildings on West 29th Street in the West Chelsea neighborhood in Manhattan.

In June 2014, Ludwick purchased $62 million Hudson Yards-area parcels, on the corner of West 38th Street and 11th Avenue in Manhattan. In July 2014, Ludwick said that Black House was seeking a $300 million construction loan, so that it could refinance a $61 million loan it had from UBS.

In September 2014, Black House filed for a mixed-use building, the Hudson Rise Hotel, at 462-470 11th Avenue. It was to include 242 hotel rooms, 108 condo hotel rooms, and 47 regular condominiums. It was planned to be 700 feet (213 meters) tall, and have 47 stories with average floor-to-floor heights of approximately 15 feet (5 meters). In October 2014, it was reported that Ludwick was buying a Hudson Yards strip club for $40 million, with the purchase expected to close in December 2015.

Ludwick sued his partners for trying to force him out, and in a motion to have Ludwick's complaint dismissed they stated "Plaintiff's behavior became erratic. He was arrested multiple times, including for assault and battery with a deadly weapon, and breaking into and painting penises in his girlfriend's apartment. The publicity surrounding his arrests damaged the business ... by, among other things, causing lenders to withdraw their financing offers or change the terms under which they would provide financing." Ludwick then dropped his lawsuit.

== Legal matters ==
=== Early years ===
In 2009, Ludwick was convicted of driving while impaired.

In May 2013, Ludwick was arrested for assault with a deadly weapon on a woman, other than his wife, who was staying with him at an inn. He was arrested, and said that he was innocent, and that it was the girlfriend who had attacked him. He eventually negotiated a plea bargain in which he received only probation.

In February 2014, Ludwick was arrested on charges, which he admitted to, that he had broken into a former mistress's New York City apartment and, in a rage, drawn penises on artwork which he had originally painted and given to her, knifed the words "Studio Art" onto two stools, and dumped a large amount of paint on the floor. Ludwick also allegedly used his ex's computer to send lewd emails to executives at her company, posing as her, saying she had engaged in relationships with married men, including her then-current supervisor. He was furious that his mistress might be unfaithful to him, despite the fact that he himself was being unfaithful to his wife. He was charged with computer trespassing, aggravated harassment, criminal mischief, stalking and impersonation. He pleaded guilty to harassment, was given a conditional discharge, and was ordered to undergo anger management therapy.

In March 2014, he was arrested for, and ultimately admitted to, assault and battery and property destruction after he had had a fight with a girlfriend.

=== Sag Harbor conviction ===
==== Crash, arrest, and charges ====
On August 30, 2015, Ludwick was arrested by Southampton Town police. He had drunkenly crashed his silver 2013 Porsche Carrera at high speed into a telephone pole in the village of Sag Harbor in Long Island, New York, at around 2:30 a.m. He allegedly then dragged the body of his critically injured passenger and friend, 53-year-old Paul Hansen, from his damaged car, dumped the body and left it lying in the street—on the block and 100 feet from where Hansen lived with his wife and sons ages 11 and 13, and where Ludwick's son was for a sleepover—and threw Hansen's wallet into the woods, and then drove away. Hansen was pronounced dead at the scene.

Ludwick's car had suffered heavy damage that included the loss of two wheels and its other two wheels were reduced to mangled rims, and the car then stalled a quarter of a mile away; Ludwick himself lived a mile away from the crash site. A neighbor called 911, and responding police found Ludwick with his car a few minutes later. A police officer reported that: "A strong odor of an alcoholic beverage was emanating from his breath. His speech was slurred and slow. His eyes were bloodshot, glassy, and hooded, or partially closed. During the interview and the investigation he stood with a wide stance, and continuously swayed from front to back, and he stumbled when he tried to walk." Ludwick refused to submit to a breathalyzer test. His damaged car was leaking oil, and the police traced the oil trail back to the scene of the crash. There they found Hansen, who was beyond saving.

Given Ludwick's refusal to take a breathalyzer test, the police obtained a court order for a blood test. Ludwick's blood was drawn five hours after the crash, and his level of blood alcohol content was over twice the New York State legal limit at .18%.

Ludwick was charged in Southampton Town Justice Court with driving while intoxicated and leaving the scene of a fatal accident (a felony). His lawyer argued that Ludwick was unlikely to seek to flee, as he was "a major real estate developer in the United States and across the world, quite frankly". However, Southampton town justice Deborah Kooperstein insisted on a $1 million bond because, she said, his previous "behaviors indicate a risk" that he would flee, and also suspended his driving privileges, calling him "a dangerous driver". In December 2015 he was indicted by a grand jury. He faced 32 years in prison on the 13-count indictment.

==== Revocation of bond ====
While he was free on $1 million bond, Ludwick allegedly made plans to skip bail and flee the country. He traveled to Puerto Rico, where he took sailing lessons, offered $400,000 in cash for a large boat capable of taking him to South America (and wired $385,000 to Puerto Rico to complete the purchase), and searched the internet for countries that did not have extradition treaties with the United States. He also searched the internet for, among other things, "10 secrets to being a good liar", "Why do fugitives get caught?", "Percentage of bail jumpers caught," and "Does Venezuela extradite to the U.S.?", it was revealed at a bail hearing.

An FBI agent moonlighting as a sailing instructor became suspicious of Ludwick, who had asked him questions about the ability of the boat to make it to South America and about extradition laws, and contacted authorities. Ludwick was tracked via his cell phone and apprehended by local authorities and the U.S. Marshals Service. In February 2016, a judge deemed him a flight risk, ordered that he be held without bail, and sent him to prison at the Suffolk County Correctional Facility.

==== Conviction, prison, and civil suit ====
In August 2017, Ludwick pleaded guilty to aggravated vehicular homicide and leaving the scene of an accident that resulted in a death, as well as aggravated driving while intoxicated, in the Central Islip courtroom of New York State Supreme Court Justice Fernando Camacho; in January 2016 he had initially pled not guilty. He was sentenced to three to nine years in a plea deal, less than the five to 15 years the prosecution had requested, and in return Ludwick waived any right to appeal.

In October 2015, Hansen's widow filed a wrongful death suit on behalf of herself and her children against Ludwick in New York State Supreme Court. In 2018, the case settled out of court.

Ludwick was denied parole three times, during which his prior criminal history was also noted; in September 2018 (where his "lack of empathy and shallow remorse" was noted), in March 2020, and in September 2021. He served time in the Downstate Correctional Facility maximum security prison in the Hudson Valley, the Gowanda Correctional Facility medium security prison (where he received a disciplinary ticket and prison sanctions for fighting), and the Otisville Correctional Facility medium-security prison in Orange County.

==== Release and parole ====
Ludwick was released from New York State prison in Otisville, where he had been inmate number 17A4448, on January 12, 2022. He was 49 years of age. Ludwick had to be released from custody by law, due to the fact that he had served five years in prison in total.

Ludwick was parole until January 12, 2025, in Suffolk County's jurisdiction. While on parole, he was prohibited from leaving New York State without the permission of his parole officer.

Hansen's wife said: "... the punishment did not fit the crime. The criminal is free to move on with his life and even return to the same neighborhood where he took so much from so many. The family of the victim is left empty, broken, and still trying to heal while dealing with the reality of the felon living around the corner. This is wrong on so many levels."

== See also ==
- Darion Conner, sentenced to and serving 15 years in prison for vehicular homicide with a BAC (blood alcohol content) of .27
- John B. Goodman, sentenced to and serving 16 years in prison, for vehicular homicide with a BAC of .17
- Bruce Kimball, sentenced to 17 years in prison, served less than five years, for vehicular homicide with a BAC of .20
- Kayla Mendoza, sentenced to and serving 24 years in prison after being charged with vehicular homicide with a BAC of .15
