= Keron Thomas =

American impersonator

- Born: c. 1975; Trinidad
- Died: July 22, 2013 (aged 37); Brooklyn, New York, US

Keron Thomas (c. 1975 – July 22, 2013) was primarily known for posing as New York City Subway motorman "Regoberto Sabio" on May 8, 1993, and operating an A train in revenue service for over three hours, when he was sixteen years old.

== Early life ==
Thomas was born in Trinidad as one of three children, and moved to the Brooklyn neighborhood of Brownsville with his family in 1990. He became interested in trains upon moving to New York, and avidly studied the New York Transit Authority's book of rules and regulations and its preparation book for the train operator's Civil Service test. In December 1992, he was arrested for trespassing at a train yard in East New York.

== A Train fame ==
Thomas signed into the 207th Street Yard in Manhattan and proceeded to operate the train that originated at the 207th Street station. Thomas's actions went unnoticed by the passengers on board the R44-type train, who were safely picked up and discharged at normal station stops along the route. He completed the trip to the Lefferts Boulevard station in Queens (one of the three southern terminals of the line), and almost made the full round-trip. However, Thomas operated the train too quickly rounding a curve in Washington Heights, just a few stops from completing his route. This tripped the train's emergency brakes (BIE, "Brakes in Emergency") and Thomas was unable to reset them.

The full scope of Thomas's actions was discovered after he was taken to the New York City Transit Authority (NYCTA) headquarters for drug and alcohol testing, a standard policy after motormen are caught speeding. Despite his actions, Thomas came to be seen by some as something of a folk hero and, as a consequence, was spared jail time. The New York Times reported: "Duty-bound to make it clear that people may not play subway motorman whenever they like but wary of punishing a folk hero – and a mere boy, at that – law-enforcement officials settled yesterday on three years' probation for the 16-year-old who took the controls of a subway train for three and a half hours in May."

== After A Train ==
In 1994, aged 18, Thomas was charged with attempted murder after being accused of stabbing another teenager in a dispute over a dice game. As a result, the probation he had received for commandeering the subway train was extended.

Subsequently, Thomas became an electrician rather than a subway motorman because it provided a bigger income. Later in life, he owned a trucking company.

== Death ==
Keron Thomas died on July 22, 2013, of heart failure at the age of 37. He had battled chronic heart failure for years.

== See also ==
- Darius McCollum
