= Taylor Hollow, New York =

Hamlet in New York, United States

Coordinates: 42°31′10″N 78°55′44″W

Taylor Hollow (Seneca: Wadé’danya’s) is a hamlet in the town of Collins in Erie County, New York, United States.
