= Darius McCollum =

American man, famous for taking control of buses and trains

Darius McCollum (born March 28, 1965) is an American man primarily known for posing as a New York City Subway motorman, bus driver, and subway train operator due to his fixation with trains and other public transit. McCollum has a long arrest record for crimes related to the transit system operated by the city's Metropolitan Transportation Authority (MTA). He has been fascinated with buses and trains since his childhood, and is autistic.

== Characteristics ==
Since an early age, McCollum has been interested in trains, frequently riding the New York City Subway. His fixation with trains led McCollum to continuously impersonate employees of MTA or related entities, which led to multiple arrests. McCollum has been rejected for employment by MTA on numerous occasions, although some claim that his knowledge of trains over-qualifies him. McCollum is said to have memorized the New York City Subway map by age 8.

At age 11, McCollum was stabbed in the chest with a pair of scissors by a classmate, puncturing his lung. Following this injury, McCollum further retreated into spending time on the subway system, skipping school to ride the subways for days on end sometimes. McCollum resisted his parents' attempts to treat him through taking him to psychiatrists, preventing him from leaving his room, and switching his schools.

A prison psychiatrist diagnosed McCollum with Asperger syndrome.

== Notable arrests ==
According to McCollum's mother, his interest with the New York City Subway system started in his youth, when motormen permitted him to drive trains. By 14, McCollum worked shifts for multiple MTA employees who paid him or gave him lunch. McCollum was first arrested in 1980, at age 15, when he drove an E subway train with passengers for six stops. While imprisoned at Rikers Island, he wrote to the New York City Department of Correction and asked if he could drive one of their buses. By the mid-1990s, McCollum "had become a minor cult figure", particularly after the MTA posted thousands of wanted posters in trains and stations so that riders could report sightings. Occasionally, McCollum would appear as transit employees named "Morning" or "Manning", who riders reportedly described as friendly and helpful.

By 2000, McCollum had been jailed 19 times for transit-related crimes. In 2000, he pleaded guilty to charges of forgery and burglary for signing out a train according to proper MTA procedure to perform customary duties (extinguishing track fires, supervising maintenance), and then signing it back in. He was sentenced to a minimum of 2 1/2 to 5 years in prison.

In 2005, McCollum was apprehended at a Long Island Rail Road yard with the keys to an M-7 railcar in his pocket. They had been given to him by MTA employees who had given him their shifts, but he pleaded guilty to attempting to steal a locomotive and was sentenced to three years in prison. Although he was released from Sing Sing in 2006, he was reimprisoned for breaking parole after he was found in possession of railroad property. Nine months later, on July 3, 2007, McCollum was released from the Downstate Correctional Facility.

On June 13, 2008, McCollum was arrested again as he tried to enter a restricted area of a midtown station. He was dressed in the blue T-shirt and work pants typically worn by track workers, and wearing a hardhat and carrying a knapsack, flashlight, and gloves with an MTA logo. McCollum was charged with criminal impersonation, criminal trespass, and possession of burglary tools—a hammer and screwdriver typically carried by all MTA maintenance workers—tucked in his backpack. When his mother was interviewed over the telephone, she said, "Any time Darius wears anything remotely resembling the transit uniform, he gets arrested."

McCollum was arrested at Penn Station on October 5, 2008, for impersonating a Long Island Rail Road employee and answering passengers' questions.

On August 31, 2010, McCollum was arrested for the 27th time and charged with grand larceny and possession of stolen property in connection with the theft of a private bus from a Trailways of New York terminal in Hoboken, New Jersey. According to police, McCollum allegedly boarded the bus at approximately 6:30 a.m. and discovered the keys left in the ignition. McCollum is accused of then commandeering the bus, with the theft reportedly going unnoticed for two hours as McCollum drove around John F. Kennedy International Airport and Jamaica, Queens. McCollum was taken into custody without incident. Police stated McCollum is "very smart, he's not a dumb guy" and that he was a "gentleman" during arrest and processing.

At the time of his arrest, McCollum had spent 18 years— more than a third of his life— in jail for transit-related offenses. In 2013, he pled guilty to stealing the Trailways bus. On December 24, 2013, McCollum was released on parole and was to voluntarily enter cognitive behavioral therapy. The terms of the parole, which lasted until August 24, 2015, required that he not operate a motor vehicle.

On November 11, 2015, McCollum was arrested for stealing a Greyhound bus from the Port Authority Bus Terminal in Manhattan. He drove the GPS-equipped bus for approximately 2 hours until his arrest at approximately 4 p.m. in Gowanus, Brooklyn. According to The New York Times, McCollum stated that he would hijack a plane after his arrest.

Although his parents, who moved to Winston-Salem, North Carolina, believed McCollum should have left New York to avoid his addiction to trains, parole conditions have until recently repeatedly restricted McCollum to remain in New York City. Suggestions from his parents and autism advocates that the MTA find a way to hire McCollum in some capacity, in the manner of Frank Abagnale, are rejected by transit officials, who fear legal liability.

In January 2018, McCollum took a plea bargain in which he agreed to go to a psychiatric institution for an "indefinite" period of time. In October 2018, a judge ruled that McCollum was becoming dangerously mentally ill, and was sentenced to the Mid-Hudson Forensic Psychiatric Hospital, a prison facility for the most dangerous imprisoned criminals. In 2025, he was moved to a facility for nonviolent offenders.

== In popular culture ==
After McCollum used an insanity defense based on Asperger's, he became a folk hero to people with autism spectrum disorders, especially children, and was celebrated for his "rebellion against what autistics often call the dreary world of the 'neurotypicals'". In spite of his diagnosis from several psychiatrists, this defense was denied during at least two criminal proceedings, as the judge ruled he was "capable of controlling his impulses".

A Harper's Magazine article on McCollum by Jeff Tietz was a finalist in profile writing for the 2003 American Society of Magazine Editors awards. At the 2003 Edinburgh Fringe, Paperhat Productions of New York mounted a play by director Jude Domski called Boy Steals Train, based on McCollum's life and letters McCollum wrote to Domski, and described as "pointing a shaming collective finger at a judiciary that refuses to recognize McCollum's condition". The play was awarded a Fringe First by The Scotsman and the troupe won a Best Ensemble Acting Award. His story was also made into a BBC radio play, broadcast on BBC Radio 4 in August 2005.

McCollum appears in Episode 2 of "The Dark End of The Spectrum", a two-hour, two-part, radio documentary that aired on CBC's radio show Ideas on June 2, 2008, and again on July 24 (part 1) and July 31 (part 2), 2009.

A documentary film about McCollum, Off the Rails: The Darius McCollum Story, directed by Adam Irving, premiered on April 7, 2016, at the Full Frame Documentary Film Festival in Durham, North Carolina.

== See also ==
- Keron Thomas, another train motorman impersonator
- Neurolaw
- Railfan
