= Off the Rails (2016 film) =

Off the Rails: The Darius McCollum Story
- Directed by: Adam Irving
- Written by: Adam Irving; Tchavdar Georgiev
- Produced by: Glen Zipper; Adam Irving
- Starring: Darius McCollum
- Cinematography: Adam Irving
- Edited by: Adam Irving; Tchavdar Georgiev
- Music by: Duncan Thum; Steve Gernes
- Production company: Zipper Bros Films
- Distributed by: The Film Collaborative; Passion River Films; Journeyman Pictures; Sundance Now
- Release dates: 7 April 2016 (Full Frame Documentary Film Festival); 4 November 2016 (US theatrical)
- Running time: 86 minutes
- Country: United States
- Language: English

Off the Rails: The Darius McCollum Story is a 2016 American documentary film about Darius McCollum, a man with Asperger's syndrome who was jailed 32 times for impersonating New York City bus drivers and subway conductors and driving their routes. The film was written, directed and produced by Adam Irving. It was nominated for a 2016 Critics' Choice Documentary Award for Best First Documentary Feature.

== Synopsis ==
As a boy in Queens, New York, in the 1970s, Darius McCollum found sanctuary from school bullies in the subway. There he befriended transit workers who taught him to drive trains. By age 8, he memorized the entire subway system. At 15, he took unauthorized control of a packed train and drove it eight stops by himself, making all the stops and announcements. Over the next three decades, McCollum commandeered hundreds of trains and buses, staying on route and on schedule, without ever getting paid. He attended transit worker union meetings, lobbying for better pay and working conditions for a union he didn't belong to.

McCollum has Asperger's syndrome, a neurological disorder characterized by social impairment, repetitive behaviors, and an intense interest in one subject. Although he never damaged any property or hurt anyone, he has spent 23 years in maximum security prison for transit-related crimes. He has been arrested 32 times, most recently in November 2016.

== Background and production ==
Director Adam Irving initially read about McCollum's transit-related escapades by happenstance on Wikipedia and thought it would make a good subject for a documentary. After doing more research on McCollum, Irving flew to New York to meet with Jude Domski, who wrote and produced a 2003 play about McCollum called Boy Steals Train. Domski helped Irving get in touch with McCollum, who was in jail at Rikers Island in New York. Over the next six months, Irving and McCollum exchanged about 100 letters and phone calls before Irving visited him at Rikers in March 2013. Irving directed, produced, shot and edited the film, which took three years to complete.

The film was shot in both New York and Toronto. Some reenactments were filmed in Toronto's Lower Bay station, a closed subway station that is still functional for moving out-of-service trains, and which has been used as a movie set in several films.

== Release ==
Off the Rails premiered at the Full Frame Documentary Film Festival in Durham, North Carolina on April 7, 2016. Its international premiere was on May 4, 2016 at Hot Docs Canadian International Documentary Festival in Toronto. Its European premiere was at London's Raindance Film Festival on September 23, 2016.

The film's international theatrical release began in Toronto on October 7, 2016, followed by its domestic release in Los Angeles on November 4, 2016. On November 18, 2016, it opened at the Metrograph Theatre in New York.

== Reception ==
Off the Rails was nominated for a 2016 Critics' Choice Documentary Award for Best First Documentary Feature, and won top honors at nine film festivals in 2016, including DOC NYC (Metropolis Competition Grand Jury Prize Winner), Newport Beach Film Festival (Jury Award for Best Documentary), Woods Hole Film Festival and DOCUTAH.

The review aggregator website Rotten Tomatoes reports a 100% score with an average rating of 8.14/10 based on 23 reviews. The site's consensus reads: "Off the Rails sparks interest with its bizarre story, but its impact lingers thanks to its empathetic treatment on its subject -- and clear advocacy for a marginalized sector of society". On Metacritic, the film holds an average score of 80 out of 100 based on 7 reviews, indicating "generally favorable reviews".

New York Times critic Neil Genzlinger called the film "an assured and thoughtful debut" for first-time director Adam Irving, designating it a New York Times Critics' Pick. Los Angeles Times critic Kenneth Turan called Off the Rails "an excellent documentary". The Hollywood Reporter labeled it "offbeat" and "enjoyable", while Variety singled out the film's "quirky electronic score", calling it "a notable plus in the [film's] well-assembled package." Sam Weisberg of The Village Voice ranked Off the Rails as the sixth-best film of 2016.
