= Bagdad, New York =

Hamlet in New York, United States

Coordinates: 42°28′58″N 78°55′12″W

Bagdad is a hamlet in the town of Collins in Erie County, New York, United States.
