= Gowanda Correctional Facility =

Medium-security prison for men in New York, US

Coordinates: 42°29′18″N 78°56′13″W

- Interactive map of Gowanda Correctional Facility
- Location: South Road, Gowanda, New York, USA
- Status: Closed
- Security class: Medium Security
- Capacity: 2,300
- Opened: 1994
- Closed: 2021
- Managed by: New York State Department of Corrections and Community Supervision

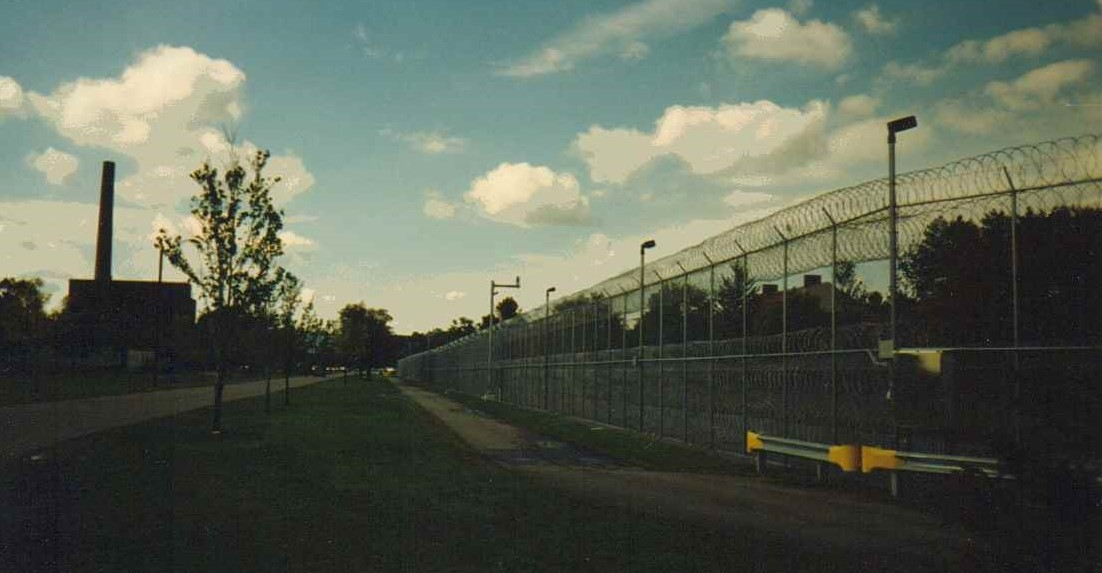
Partial view of Gowanda Correctional Facility with power plant in background at left, September 1996

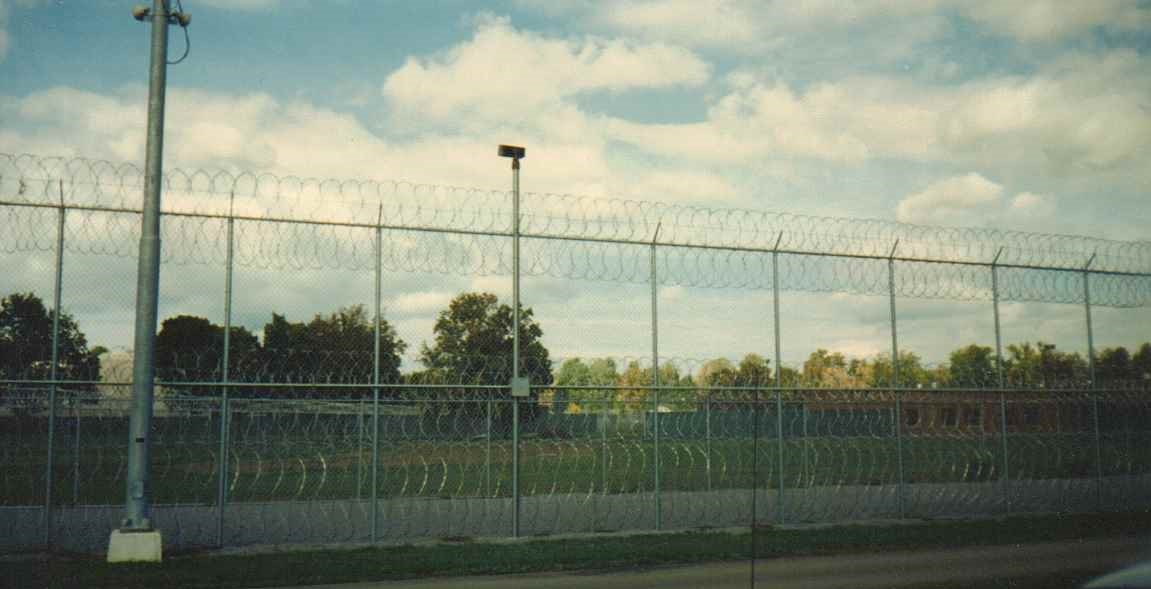
Partial view of medium-security fencing at Gowanda Correctional Facility, south side, September 1996

The Gowanda Correctional Facility was a medium-security prison for men located in Gowanda, New York, United States. The prison was located in the south part of Erie County in the Town of Collins. It was adjacent to the Collins Correctional Facility, another medium-security prison. Both prisons were located north of Village of Gowanda at the southern end of Erie County. It opened in 1994 and closed in 2021.

== History ==
In 1894, the Erie County Legislature passed an Act that gave rise to the Homeopathic State Hospital (later known as the "Gowanda Psychiatric Center," prior to being much later-converted into correctional facilities) in Gowanda and Collins, New York. Land purchased for the State Hospital by Erie County included 500 acres and was known as the "Taylor tract." When the State Care Act was effected in 1894, the land was transferred to the State of New York, which then conveyed it to the State Hospital. The correctional facility is situated along Taylor Hollow Road in Gowanda, with such road named for the farmer who owned the land that was purchased and used, originally, for the State Hospital.

The grounds and buildings of both the Gowanda Correctional Facility and the Collins Correctional Facility were formerly the Gowanda Psychiatric Center. In 1982, 40% of the original 500 acres of the Gowanda Psychiatric Center was utilized for the Collins Correctional Facility. The Gowanda Correctional Facility was created using the remaining acreage and facilities and opened its doors in 1994. The two prisons are separated by a fence, and were administered independently. Gowanda Correctional Facility housed more than 2,300 inmates, and was the second-largest prison in New York State. Another source reported that the prison housed 1,750 inmates. It also featured one of the largest sex offender counseling programs of the New York State prison systems.

== Violence by inmates ==
On February 5, 2014, nine inmates in a housing unit at the Gowanda Correctional facility attacked three corrections officers there. One officer was beaten unconscious by the inmates. He and another officer had concussions and additional injuries. The third officer was slightly injured.

== Notable inmates ==
- Sean Ludwick, convicted of vehicular homicide
- Eric Smith, murderer

== See also ==
- List of New York state prisons
