= Daniel R. Gernatt Sr. =

American businessman

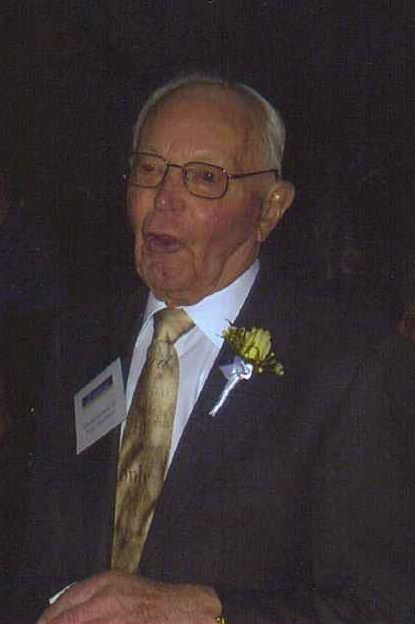
- Gernatt at Diocese of Buffalo Catholic Education Awards Dinner, 2007
- Born: February 7, 1917; Collins, New York, United States
- Died: May 5, 2014 (aged 97); Collins, New York, United States
- Occupations: Chairman, Gernatt Family of Companies; Co-Founder, Dan Gernatt Farms
- Spouse: Flavia C. (Schmitz) Gernatt

Daniel R. Gernatt Sr. (February 7, 1917 – May 5, 2014) was an American entrepreneur, businessman, horseman, and dairy farmer in Collins, New York.

Gernatt and his wife Flavia began a farming enterprise, Dan Gernatt Farms, that included raising dairy cows and later breeding and racing Standardbred horses. Beginning in the 1940s, they began marketing sand and gravel from their property, leading to their establishment and ownership of several mining businesses, now known as the Gernatt Family of Companies.

Gernatt started a charitable foundation, and was a donor and supporter of St. Joseph Parish in Gowanda, and the Roman Catholic Diocese of Buffalo. He was recognized with awards for his contributions and service.

== Background and early life ==
Gernatt was born and raised in Collins, New York, and lived there his entire life. He was one of 10 children born to John and Martha Gernatt, who were German and Austrian immigrants. He was raised on a farm, and for a 4-H project he successfully raised and sold turkeys at the age of 17. He was a member of St. Joseph Parish in Gowanda, New York, and attended the school there for several years.

== Business interests ==
Gernatt married Flavia C. Schmitz in 1938, and they began Dan Gernatt Dairy Farms in 1938. In the 1950s, the couple was identified as having the largest milking dairy herd in Erie County. As the Gernatts' farming business expanded, it was later simply known as Dan Gernatt Farms. In the 1960s, the Gernatt's transitioned their dairy farming business to one of breeding and racing Standardbred horses. The Gernatts established themselves in horse breeding and harness racing throughout a period of three decades. The horse business raised and sold more than 1,000 horses. Among the Gernatts' harness racing horses were those that were bred on their farm, identified by the presence of the last name 'Collins', the town's name.

The Gernatt Family of Companies, also known simply as Gernatt's, is a group of 11 businesses located in Western New York State that market sand, gravel, soil, crushed stone, rocks, asphalt, aggregate, and cement. The corporate businesses include Dan Gernatt Gravel Products, Inc.; Gernatt Asphalt Products, Inc.; and Country Side Sand and Gravel, Inc., with headquarters at Taylor Hollow Road in Collins, New York. Other businesses are in Gowanda, Freedom, Irving, Great Valley, Springville, Chaffee, West Seneca, Delevan, South Dayton, and Westfield, all in the New York State counties of Erie, Cattaraugus, and Chautauqua. The companies were cofounded in 1946 by Gernatt and his late wife, Flavia C. (Schmitz) Gernatt. The companies also own and operate the public Gowanda Airport. The companies are also involved in oil and natural gas exploration, maintain a real estate division, and are copartners in an electric cogeneration plant.

== Philanthropy ==
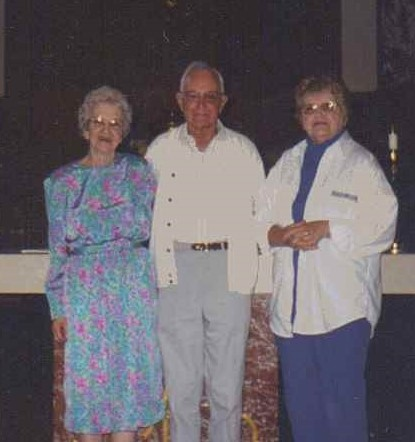
Gernatt with parishioners at St. Joseph Church, 2006

In 1987, Gernatt and his wife established the Daniel and Flavia Gernatt Family Foundation, which provides grants and loans mostly in the areas of education, healthcare, Christian-related endeavors, and poverty and homeless relief. In 1995 it helped the Amish Valley View Cheese Cooperative Association in Conewango, New York reopen the 35-year-old cheese plant there, which had been closed for two years.

Gernatt and his wife donated the construction of a new rectory to St. Joseph Parish in Gowanda in 1992. In 1996 he created the Gernatt Family Endowment Fund for St. Joseph School in Gowanda. He was also a benefactor to the Roman Catholic Diocese of Buffalo and regularly donated to Catholic Charities of Buffalo and Western New York.

In 2004, the family's foundation and companies donated $150,000 to TLC Health Network's $1 million campaign to make renovations to and update diagnostic imaging equipment at hospitals in Gowanda and Irving, New York. The donation was identified as a "jump start" to the health network's capital campaign drive.

== Recognition ==
In 2001, Gernatt received the DeWitt Clinton Masonic Award. In 2007 he received the Bishop's Medal from the bishop of the Roman Catholic Diocese of Buffalo.

== Personal life ==
Gernatt has a son, Daniel Jr., and two daughters, Patricia Rebmann and Phyllis Ulmer. Gernatt died in 2014 following a short illness.

== See also ==
- Gernatt Asphalt Products, Inc. v. Town of Sardinia
