= Downstate Correctional Facility =

Maximum-security prison in New York, US

Coordinates: 41°31′58″N 73°56′42″W

- Interactive map of Downstate Correctional Facility
- Location: 121 Red Schoolhouse Road Fishkill, New York
- Status: Closed
- Security class: Maximum
- Opened: 1979
- Closed: March 10, 2022
- Managed by: New York State Department of Corrections and Community Supervision

Downstate Correctional Facility was a maximum-security prison in the Town of Fishkill in the Hudson Valley region of New York. It was located along the north side (i.e. westbound) of Interstate 84, opening in 1979 and closing in 2022.

== Location ==
As the vast majority of inmates in New York State come from New York City, the Town of Fishkill, located in southern Dutchess County, was chosen as prison site due to its proximity to the greater New York metropolitan area.

Downstate was right across Interstate 84 from New York state's former psychiatric hospital, which since 1976 has been known as Fishkill Correctional Facility, a multi-level security prison. It was also adjacent to Dutchess Stadium, home field of the Hudson Valley Renegades.

== History ==
In 2016 Preet Bharara, the U.S. Attorney for the Southern District of New York, criminally charged three correctional officers at Downstate with beating an inmate, and two other officers with filing false reports.

On March 10, 2022, Downstate Correctional Facility was permanently closed, due to a declining prison population in New York state. The state estimated that the closure would result in a savings of $142 million. The staff and inmates were transferred to other facilities within the system.

In December 2022, the New York State Prison Redevelopment Commission discussed plans to market and redevelop the site, along with other New York prisons closed in recent years.

== Description ==
Along with Elmira Correctional Facility and Bedford Hills Correctional Facility (women), Downstate served primarily as a classification and reception facility for new inmates entering the New York State prison system. New inmates typically waited at Downstate for a few weeks before they were assigned to a permanent facility. The "permanent" prisoners—those who worked in the kitchens, laundry, etc., which those in transit could not do—were referred to as the "cadre" and were all maximum-security prisoners, with sentences of at minimum seven years.

Cells in Downstate were organized into four wings around a large and exactly square room called The Square, which was the junction point for the four wings and contained a staffed waiting room. Inmate movement was scheduled and tightly controlled. An inmate who required medical attention had to be escorted to the infirmary by an officer. Shower opportunities were also scheduled.

Services such as reception, clothes, pharmacy, medical, commissary, chapel, mail, packages, visiting, and cafeteria were all centrally located, but there were small libraries in each of the wings. There was a professional librarian, who supervised cadre workers at two locations, and a part-time rabbi. Library visits were short, scheduled, and in groups. There were dropboxes in the wings where prisoners being moved out of the facility, as most soon were after arrival, could deposit any library books that they had checked out.

For many years, there was a softball field outside the prison building, used mainly by the cadre. Recreation could consist of an hour in a room with twenty other inmates and a television.

== Notable inmates ==
- Patrick Baxter, rapist and serial killer
- Sean Ludwick, convicted of vehicular homicide
- Darius McCollum, posed as New York City Subway motorman, bus driver, and subway train operator
