= Patrick Baxter (serial killer) =

American serial killer and rapist

- Born: April 28, 1969 (age 57); White Plains, New York, U.S.
- Convictions: Murder x3 Auto theft
- Penalty: Life imprisonment

Details
- Victims: 3
- Span of crimes: 1987–1990
- Country: United States
- State: New York
- Date apprehended: 2000
- Imprisoned at: Elmira Correctional Facility, Elmira, New York

Patrick Baxter (born April 28, 1969) is an American serial killer who raped and killed two women and a teenage girl in Westchester County, New York, between 1987 and 1990. Due to DNA profiling, Baxter was arrested for the murders in 2000 while serving a sentence for car theft and was convicted and sentenced to 25 years to life imprisonment.

== Murders ==
In the span of three years, one girl and two women were sexually assaulted and subsequently murdered in Westchester County. Initially, they were believed to be unrelated cases, as the victims were of different races, shared no commonalities and each was killed in a different town. Thanks to advancements in DNA technology, all three murders, which had become some of the county's oldest cold cases, were finally connected and solved. They were the following:

- Michelle Walker (14) - on June 6, 1987, Walker, a black 9th-grade student, was sent by her family to buy pizza and a carton of milk at a store in Yonkers. While returning home, she walked along a popular trail, but didn't return home. The next day, her body was found in a wooded area of the trail, with her cash and jewelry missing. It was determined that she had been sexually assaulted, and died from asphyxiation, as her attacker had covered her nose and mouth. At the time, the then-18-year-old Baxter was living at an apartment in the neighborhood which overlooked the trail. Although the authorities wanted to question him, he was due in court for a separate case, and due to a law at the time, he couldn't be questioned in the murder.
- Patricia England (19) - on New Year's Day that same year, England, a white resident of Yonkers, went out to visit a friend to celebrate her birthday. However, she vanished, and her frozen body was found two months later at Greenburgh, close to the Yonkers border. She had been sexually assaulted and likely killed via asphyxiation, with the crime scene occurring at a different place and the killer later transporting the body to the location. At first, Patricia's boyfriend was considered a suspect, but was ruled out via semen sample. The boyfriend had previously worked with Baxter at an autorepair shop in Yonkers, where they befriended each other. Through him, Baxter learned about Patricia.
- Lisa Gibbens (25) - originally from Manhattan, Gibbens moved to Tuckahoe in the late 1980s in search of a quieter life. She had recently found a new job as a medical office receptionist at Hartsdale, and on July 17, 1990, she was en route to work when she was attacked near the Crestwood train station. Her attacker ripped through her clothing and sexually assaulted her, tossing her pantyhose aside. After finishing, he shot her once in the back of the head with a sawed-off shotgun, before stealing her purse and jewelry. She was later discovered by a bicyclist. The killing shocked the community, as murders were a rarity in Tuckahoe.At the time, her boyfriend and a carpenter named Douglas Steadman were considered suspects, but both were later eliminated. Baxter came across Gibbens by chance, as his only connection to the area was hanging out with some friends at the Crestwood Train Station.

== Exposure and imprisonment ==
Since 1990, Patrick Baxter was jailed and released from prison on several occasions for different crimes. In the mid-1990s, he was convicted of auto theft in The Bronx and sentenced to 3-to-7 years imprisonment at the Downstate Correctional Facility in Fishkill, with eligibility for parole in 2001. In early 2000, investigators examining cold cases noticed that Baxter's name kept popping up in relation to these cases, and they ordered that he give a blood sample for testing. After a legal battle, a sample was provided, which matched the killer's DNA in all three cases.

Charges were soon filed, and Baxter was brought to trial in 2002. He was convicted of all three murders and sentenced to 25 years to life imprisonment for each murder, to be served consecutively. During his sentencing, he expressed his condolences to the victims' families, but calmly denied committing the murders.

== See also ==
- List of serial killers in the United States
