= Collins, New York =

- Town
- Seal

- Location in Erie County and the state of New York.

- Location of New York in the United States
- Coordinates: 42°29′47″N 78°55′14″W
- Country: United States
- State: New York
- County: Erie
- Incorporated: 1821

Government
  - Mayor: David Tessmer

Area
  - Total: 48.14 sq mi (124.68 km^{2})
  - Land: 47.97 sq mi (124.23 km^{2})
  - Water: 0.17 sq mi (0.45 km^{2})
- Elevation: 1,079 ft (329 m)

Population (2020)
  - Total: 5,894 ▼
  - Density: 137.2/sq mi (52.96/km^{2})
- Time zone: UTC-5
  - Summer (DST): UTC-4 (EDT)
- ZIP Codes: 14034 (Collins); 14035 (Collins Center); 14070 (Gowanda); 14091 (Lawtons); 14141 (Springville)
- Area code: 716
- FIPS code: 36-029-17200
- Website: townofcollinsny.gov

Collins is a town in Erie County, New York, United States. The town is on the south border of the county and is considered to be one of the "Southtowns" of Erie County. The population at the 2010 census was 6,601.

== History ==
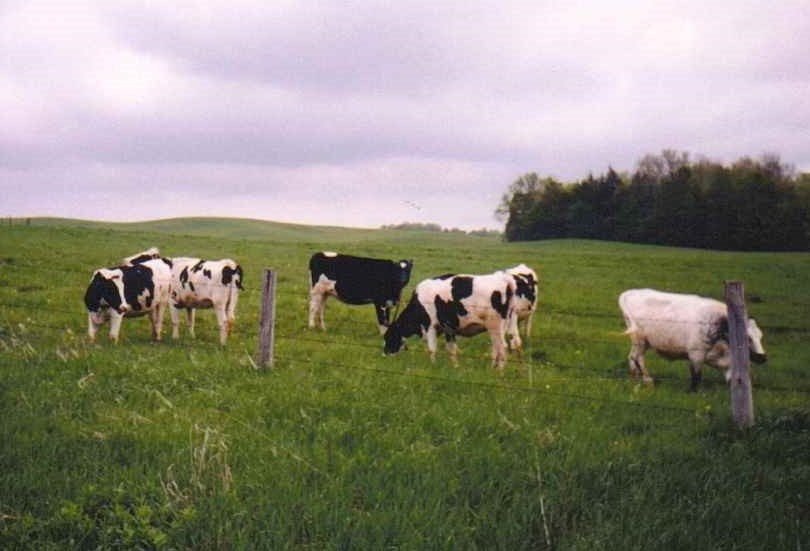
Dairy cows, Collins Center, New York, 1999

The area was first settled by Whites in 1811. Many of the first settlers were Quakers, who intended to assist the local Native Americans. The town of Collins was formed March 6, 1821, from the town of Concord, and was named after the Collins family, a dairy farming family who lived in and were publicly active in the area. The town lost land to create the new towns of Brant in 1839 and North Collins in 1852. Because of the concentration of dairy farms, there were once ten cheese and milk factories in the town.

== Geography ==
According to the United States Census Bureau, the town has a total area of 48.1 square miles (124.7 km^{2}), of which 48.0 square miles (124.2 km^{2}) is land and 0.2 square miles (0.5 km^{2}), or 0.36%, is water.

The south town line of Collins, marked by Cattaraugus Creek, is the county line of Cattaraugus County.

U.S. Route 62 runs north–south through the town, and New York State Route 39 runs east–west and intersects with north–south New York State Route 75.

== Demographics ==
Historical population
Census	Pop.	Note	%±
1830	2,120		—
1840	4,257		100.8%
1850	4,001		−6.0%
1860	2,119		−47.0%
1870	2,100		−0.9%
1880	2,371		12.9%
1890	2,362		−0.4%
1900	2,875		21.7%
1910	3,742		30.2%
1920	4,061		8.5%
1930	4,424		8.9%
1940	5,819		31.5%
1950	6,862		17.9%
1960	6,984		1.8%
1970	6,400		−8.4%
1980	5,037		−21.3%
1990	6,020		19.5%
2000	8,307		38.0%
2010	6,601		−20.5%
2020	5,894		−10.7%
U.S. Decennial Census

As of the census of 2000, there were 8,307 people, 1,754 households, and 1,187 families residing in the town. The population density was 172.6 inhabitants per square mile (66.6/km^{2}). There were 1,884 housing units at an average density of 39.2 per square mile (15.1/km^{2}). The racial makeup of the town was 66.85% White, 22.62% African American, 3.47% Native American, 0.22% Asian, 6.16% from other races, and 0.69% from two or more races. Hispanic or Latino of any race were 11.94% of the population.

There were 1,754 households, out of which 30.0% had children under the age of 18 living with them, 53.5% were married couples living together, 9.7% had a female householder with no husband present, and 32.3% were non-families. 26.7% of all households were made up of individuals, and 12.0% had someone living alone who was 65 years of age or older. The average household size was 2.50 and the average family size was 3.04.

In the town, the population was spread out, with 13.3% under the age of 18, 10.0% from 18 to 24, 48.6% from 25 to 44, 19.7% from 45 to 64, and 8.4% who were 65 years of age or older. The median age was 36 years. For every 100 females, there were 273.7 males. For every 100 females age 18 and over, there were 318.8 males.

The median income for a household in the town was $34,444, and the median income for a family was $45,647. Males had a median income of $30,215 versus $26,071 for females. The per capita income for the town was $14,082. About 6.2% of families and 8.5% of the population were below the poverty line, including 10.6% of those under age 18 and 8.1% of those age 65 or over.

== Communities and locations in the town ==
- Babbitch Corners – A hamlet in the western part of the town of Collins, at the intersection of NY-39 and Quaker Street. Home to the now defunct McGinty's Millery and the Pibbens' pig farm which has been operational since 1902.
- Bagdad – A hamlet northeast of Gowanda.
- Black Hills – A hamlet named for the abnormally black soil located in the hills.
- Collins Center – A hamlet centrally located in the town at the junction of NY-39 and NY-75.
- Collins Correctional Facility – A NYS medium security prison located right next to Gowanda Correctional Facility separated by Middle Road.
- Gowanda - A village partly located in the southwest part of the town. It is located on NY-62.
- Gowanda Correctional Facility – A NYS medium security prison located right next to Collins Correctional Facility separated by Middle Road. Middle Road is the border between the town of Collins and the village of Gowanda. Both of the correctional facilities are the former Gowanda Psychiatric Center (also known as the former Homeopathic State Hospital).
- Hutzenlaub Hill – A large hill on the outskirts of town which have had several German immigrant families settle there over multiple generations.
- McIntosh Woods – Woods located between the town of Collins and the village of Gowanda. It was named due to the now wild McIntosh apple trees which were planted for the former Gowanda Psychiatric Center patients to enjoy.
- Seneca Heights – A neighborhood community located at the intersection of Richardson Road and NY-62(Taylor Hollow Road). Seneca Heights is home to the Gernatt Family of Companies.
- Taylor Hollow – A neighborhood community in the northeast corner of the town on NY-62. Taylor Hollow and Taylor Hollow Road were named for the 500 acres of land in that area that was the property of the Taylor Family, a dairy farming family, in the early part of the nineteenth century.
- Tubtown – Located near intersection of Rt 62 & Rt 39 - A tub making company named Waltz Watermann Tubs built tubs there between 1899 and 1933. A bar was later named Tubtown in its honor in the 1970s.
- Whites Corners – A location in the northeast corner of the town on NY-75. Named after Ezekiel White's large farm which was located on the intersection.
- Zoar – A hamlet in the southeast corner of the town.
- Zoar Valley – A scenic valley formed by Cattaraugus Creek.

== Notable people ==
- Elon Howard Eaton, ornithologist, scholar, and author
- Daniel R. Gernatt, Sr. and Flavia C. (Schmitz) Gernatt, co-founders of the Gernatt Family of Companies
- Frank Manly Thorn (1836–1907), lawyer, politician, government official, essayist, journalist, humorist, and inventor, sixth superintendent of the United States Coast and Geodetic Survey (1885–1889), born in the portion of town that later became North Collins.

== See also ==
- Gowanda, New York
- North Collins, New York
