= Gowanda, New York =

Gowanda, New York Seneca: Dzogöwödih
- Village
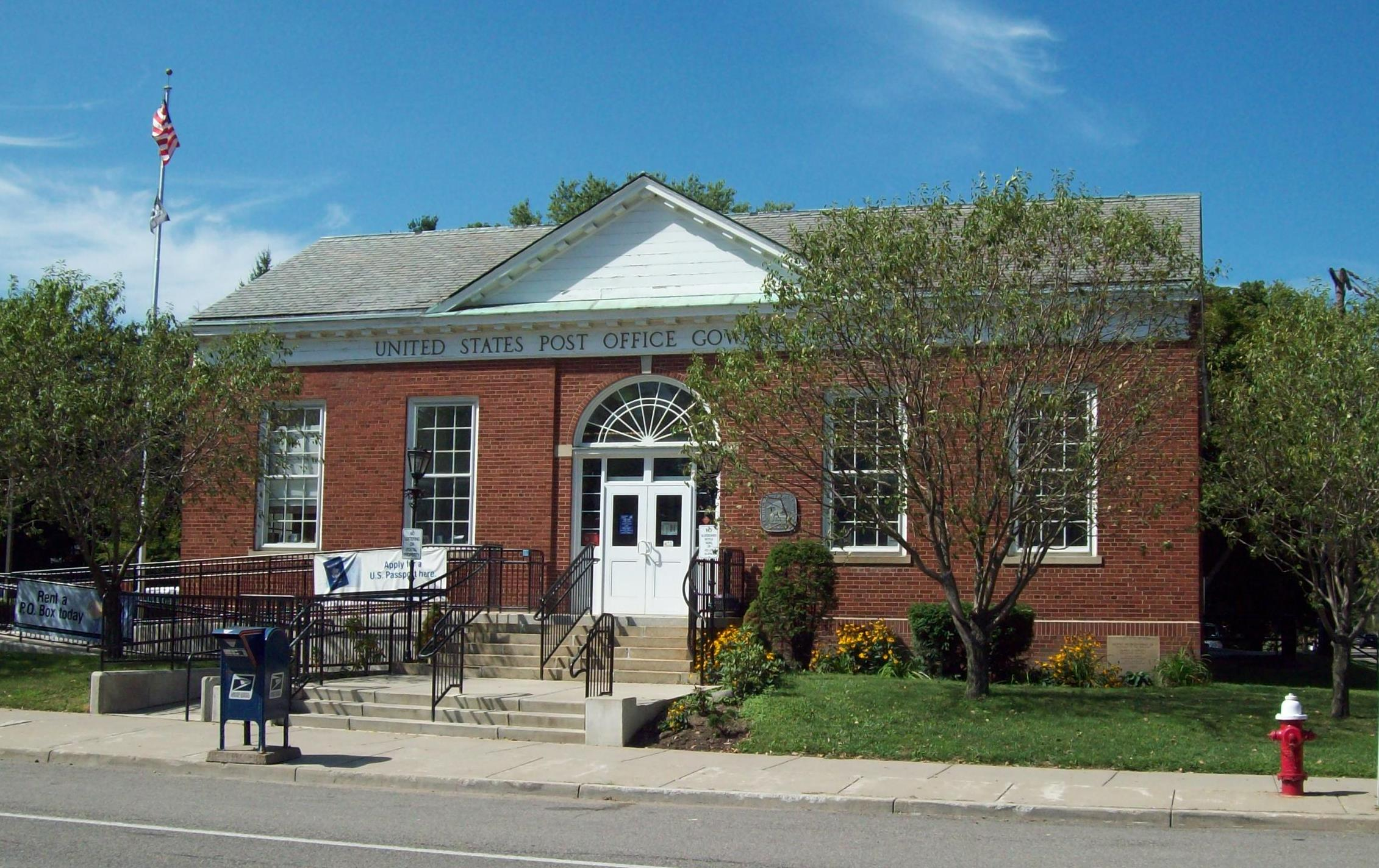
- U.S. Post Office, Gowanda, NY (2010)

- Location in Erie County and the state of New York
- Coordinates: 42°27′48″N 78°56′11″W
- Country: United States
- State: New York
- Counties: Cattaraugus, Erie
- Towns: Persia, Collins

Area
  - Total: 1.61 sq mi (4.17 km^{2})
  - Land: 1.59 sq mi (4.13 km^{2})
  - Water: 0.015 sq mi (0.04 km^{2})
- Elevation: 761 ft (232 m)

Population (2020)
  - Total: 2,513
  - Density: 1,577.5/sq mi (609.09/km^{2})
- Time zone: UTC-5 (Eastern (EST))
  - Summer (DST): UTC-4 (EDT)
- ZIP code: 14070
- Area code: 716
- FIPS code: 36-29630
- GNIS feature ID: 0951430
- Website: villageofgowanda.com

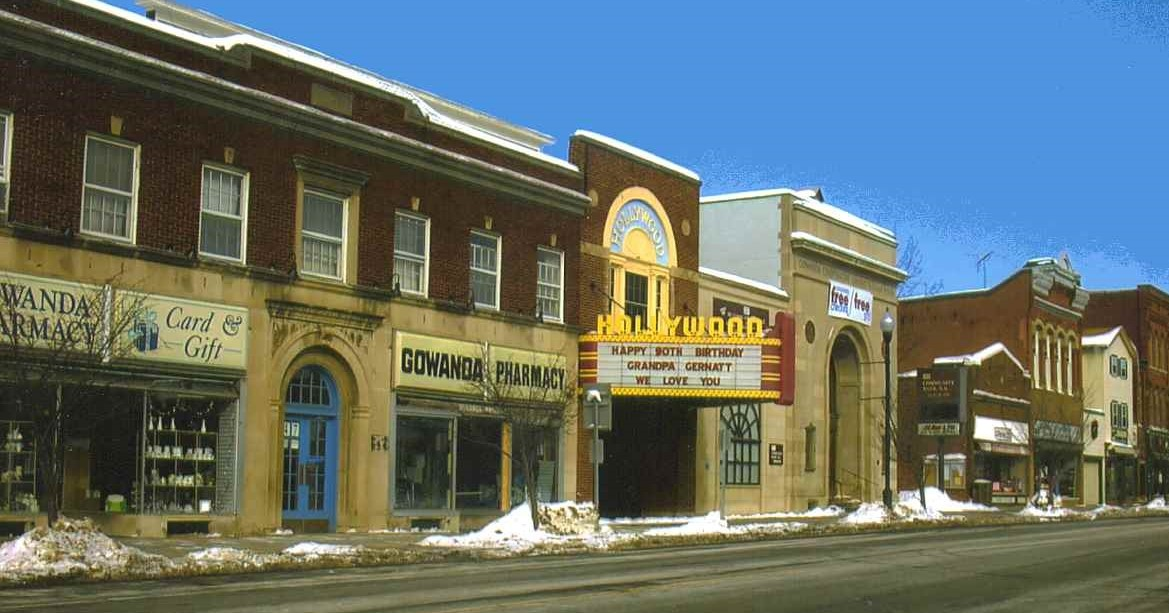
Partial north side view of West Main Street, 2007

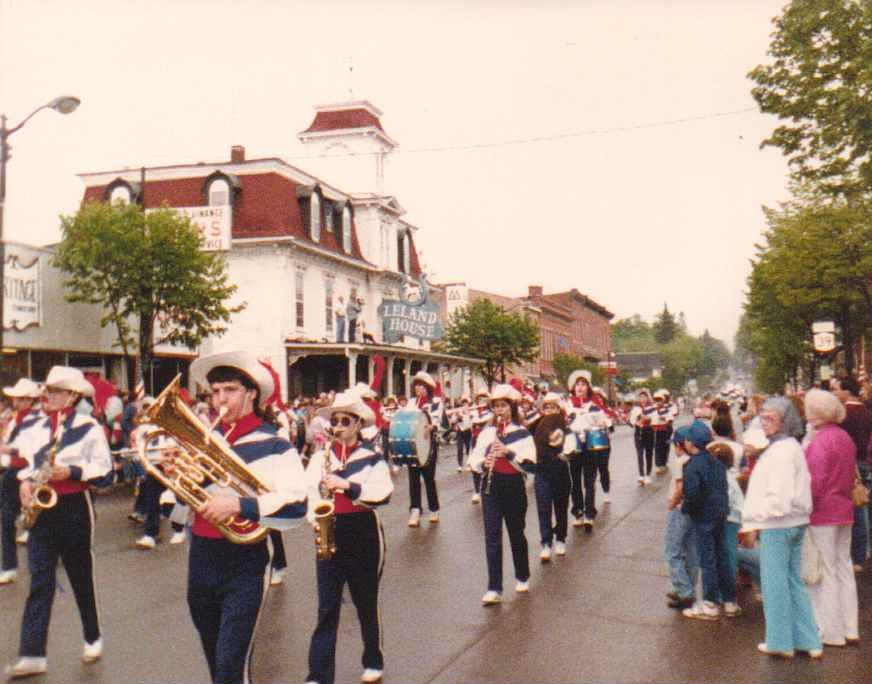
Gowanda High School Marching Band at Springville Pageant of Bands, 1988

Gowanda (Seneca: Dzogöwödih) is a village in western New York, United States. It lies partly in Erie County and partly in Cattaraugus County. The population was 2,513 at the 2020 census. The name is derived from a local Seneca language term meaning "almost surrounded by hills" or "a valley among the hills". The Erie County portion of Gowanda is part of the Buffalo-Niagara Falls metropolitan area, while the Cattaraugus County portion is part of the Olean micropolitan statistical area.

The village is partly in the Town of Collins in Erie County and partly in the Town of Persia in Cattaraugus County. Bordering Gowanda is the Cattaraugus Reservation, which has a majority population of Seneca. Numerous European Americans live on the reservation in leased properties.

Gowanda Airport (D59) is a general-aviation grass strip. It is part of the Gernatt Family of Companies' land, located northwest of the village.

Zoar Valley on Cattaraugus Creek east of Gowanda features over 2,000 acres (8.1 km^{2}) of wilderness, hiking trails and waterfalls.

== Geography ==
Gowanda is located at 42°27′48″N 78°56′11″W (42.463197, -78.936350).

According to the United States Census Bureau, the village has a total area of 1.6 square miles (4.2 km^{2}), of which 0.02 square miles (0.04 km^{2}), or 1.00%, is covered by water.

The village is split by Cattaraugus Creek, the dividing boundary between Erie and Cattaraugus Counties, with the northern part of the village in Erie County and the southern in Cattaraugus.

The village is located on US 62, Broadway Road (County Road 4), NY 39, and NY 438. The NFTA provided bus service in the area until it abandoned the route in 2011. The Seneca Transit System began serving the village in 2013.

The New York & Lake Erie Railroad has a depot in Gowanda, from which it runs both freight and occasional passenger rail service.

The Cattaraugus Reservation is located to the northwest of the village.

== Demographics ==
Historical population
Census	Pop.	Note	%±
1870	994		—
1880	1,243		25.1%
1900	2,143		—
1910	2,012		−6.1%
1920	2,673		32.9%
1930	3,042		13.8%
1940	3,156		3.7%
1950	3,289		4.2%
1960	3,352		1.9%
1970	3,110		−7.2%
1980	2,713		−12.8%
1990	2,901		6.9%
2000	2,842		−2.0%
2010	2,709		−4.7%
2020	2,513		−7.2%
2023 (est.)	2,456	▼	−2.3%
U.S. Decennial Census

=== 2020 census ===
As of the 2020 census, Gowanda had a population of 2,513. The median age was 45.1 years. 19.7% of residents were under the age of 18 and 21.3% of residents were 65 years of age or older. For every 100 females there were 93.6 males, and for every 100 females age 18 and over there were 89.9 males age 18 and over.

96.1% of residents lived in urban areas, while 3.9% lived in rural areas.

There were 1,121 households in Gowanda, of which 25.3% had children under the age of 18 living in them. Of all households, 33.5% were married-couple households, 22.2% were households with a male householder and no spouse or partner present, and 32.5% were households with a female householder and no spouse or partner present. About 38.5% of all households were made up of individuals and 16.4% had someone living alone who was 65 years of age or older.

There were 1,275 housing units, of which 12.1% were vacant. The homeowner vacancy rate was 2.6% and the rental vacancy rate was 9.5%.

Racial composition as of the 2020 census
Race	Number	Percent
White	2,210	87.9%
Black or African American	26	1.0%
American Indian and Alaska Native	128	5.1%
Asian	11	0.4%
Native Hawaiian and Other Pacific Islander	0	0.0%
Some other race	18	0.7%
Two or more races	120	4.8%
Hispanic or Latino (of any race)	71	2.8%

=== 2000 census ===
As of the census of 2000, 2,842 people, 1,161 households, and 667 families were residing in the village. The population density was 1,772.3 inhabitants per square mile (684.3/km^{2}). There were 1,277 housing units at an average density of 796.4 per square mile (307.5/km^{2}). The racial makeup of the village was 62.47% White, 0.49% African American, 41.54% Native American, 0.35% Asian, 0.21% from other races, and 1.20% from two or more races. Hispanic or Latino of any race were 1.41% of the population.

There were 1,161 households, out of which 27.4% had children under the age of 18 living with them, 40.1% were married couples living together, 12.5% had a female householder with no husband present, and 42.5% were non-families. 36.7% of all households were made up of individuals, and 17.7% had someone living alone who was 65 years of age or older. The average household size was 2.26 and the average family size was 2.98.

In the village, the population was spread out, with 23.5% under the age of 18, 6.8% from 18 to 24, 26.0% from 25 to 44, 20.1% from 45 to 64, and 23.6% who were 65 years of age or older. The median age was 41 years. For every 100 females, there were 89.6 males. For every 100 females age 18 and over, there were 82.5 males.

The median income for a household in the village was $29,565, and the median income for a family was $39,094. Males had a median income of $32,279 versus $25,281 for females. The per capita income for the village was $16,323. About 9.5% of families and 14.4% of the population were below the poverty line, including 20.2% of those under age 18 and 9.5% of those age 65 or over.

== History ==
=== Early habitation by American Indians ===
The area was first inhabited during the Stone Age by nomadic Algonquian peoples. An Algonquian earthwork mound from the first or second Stone Age is located on a farm in the area of Rosenberg along Zoar Valley near Gowanda. The mound is believed to be about 3,500 years old. Artifacts including spearheads, copper heads, and stone implements of a crude nature have been excavated from the site. In the latter half of the 14th century, Iroquoian-speaking peoples traveled to the area and lived along Cattaraugus Creek. They were proud, considering themselves to be "chosen people". Other tribes lived in the area around this time. The powerful nations of the Haudenosaunee Confederacy (Iroquois) defeated the Erie people (also an Iroquoian-speaking tribe), driving them out of the area or assimilating captives by adoption in certain clans. About this time, the Five Nations of the Confederacy coalesced as distinct peoples. They made a pact of cooperation rather than warfare. They controlled much of present-day New York state west of Albany and the Hudson River.

After the Revolutionary War, the American government secured land treaties with the Haudenosaunee nations in western New York in 1784 and 1788. Because the majority of the nations had been allies of the British, they were forced to cede most of their lands in New York after the British defeat and United States independence.

In 1796 and 1797, Robert Morris purchased extensive lands in the upstate areas, mostly American Indian lands, and mortgaged them to the Holland Land Company of Willem Willink and 11 associates of Amsterdam in the Netherlands. Excluded from his purchases in 1797 were territories for ten American Indian reservations within the state, with the Cattaraugus Reservation of 42 square miles (110 km^{2}) among these. Thereafter, two land offices of the Holland Land Company were opened in Batavia, New York, and Danby, Vermont. Many early settlers to Gowanda were from the Danby area, and many were Quakers.

=== Settlement and incorporation ===
Originally called "Aldrich's Mills" after the first European-American settler, Turner Aldrich, the European-American village was settled in 1810 and began to develop. He and his family of three sons and three daughters traveled up Cattaraugus Creek from Connecticut, taking 707 acres (286 ha) of land, comprising a large portion of what is Gowanda today. Aldrich built a sawmill and in 1817 a gristmill. Records of farmers coming from a 30-mile (48 km) radius for their grain to be ground are held by the historical society. At that time, farmers and pioneers traveled along American Indian trails through the dense forest, with their wagons being pulled by oxen.

Jacob Taylor, a Quaker missionary from the Friends Yearly Meeting of Philadelphia, was sent in 1809 to serve the American Indians in the area. Taylor Hollow is named for him. In 1811, he built, owned, and operated a sawmill and gristmill. Other missionaries accompanied Taylor, and though they called themselves a "family," they were not related.

The village later adopted the name "Lodi", though there was confusion in mail delivery due to "Lodi" in Seneca County, New York (the post office officially used the name "West Lodi" for what is now Gowanda to distinguish the two). When the village was incorporated, it dropped that name, although the post office retained the name "Persia." The Seneca in the area knew this place as Dzogöwödih, "on the other side of the ridge", or Juc-Gowanda, meaning "a valley among the hills". The settlers adopted the name "Gowanda" for the village. It was first incorporated in 1848, and was re-incorporated in 1878 under a new state regulation. At the latter time, the village extended its territory to annex the nearby hamlet of Hidi.

=== 19th century ===
Most of the village in Erie County, made up of wooden buildings, was destroyed by a fire in 1856. Another fire in 1875 burned many businesses in the Cattaraugus part.

A historical book about Gowanda identifies 120 men, including Caucasians and American Indians, who were Gowanda residents and who fought in the Civil War in New York regiments. The same book also identifies six men who had been Gowanda residents, but who enlisted and fought in the Civil War with regiments from Ohio, Wisconsin, Pennsylvania, and Michigan.

Long associated with Gowanda although located outside its boundaries, the Thomas Asylum for Orphan and Destitute Indian Children (also known as the "Thomas Indian School") was built following a gift of 50 acres (20 ha) of land on the Cattaraugus Reservation. The school was incorporated in 1855. In June 1856, the institution opened and was immediately at capacity in housing 50 orphaned American Indian children. The Thomas Asylum housed and schooled orphaned American Indian children for decades, until the latter part of the twentieth century.

In 1894, the Erie County Legislature passed an act that authorized establishment of the Homeopathic State Hospital (later known as the "Gowanda Psychiatric Center") in Gowanda and Collins. Erie County purchased 500 acres (200 ha) of land for the hospital site, known as the "Taylor tract". When the State Care Act was effected in 1894, the land was transferred to the State of New York, which conveyed it to the state hospital.

Since the late 20th century, the facility has been adapted for use as a correctional center. It borders Taylor Hollow Road in Gowanda. The road was named for the original owner of the land that was purchased and used for the State Hospital.

=== 20th century ===
==== Tanning and glue industries ====
Important industries that flourished in Gowanda during the twentieth century, but which also polluted the adjoining Cattaraugus Creek, included the Peter Cooper Corporation Glue Factory and the Moench Tannery. The first tannery in Gowanda was begun by Samuel T. Munger in 1829, although one was already in operation by Smith Bartlett since 1815 in Collins. In 1829, to tan one side of leather in six months was considered quick work. Other tanneries in operation in Gowanda were by the Benton Brothers; K. Webster (which was purchased by Agle & Sons in 1860); and Albert Gaensslen. In 1852, Albert Gaensslen converted the former wool factory in Gowanda to a leather plant with 12 liquor vats. The Gaensslen Brothers tannery manufactured only shoe sole leather. Gaensslen Brothers tannery was established in 1855; reorganizing as Gaensslen, Fisher & Company in 1896, following the partnership with E.C. Fisher. In 1879, the Gaensslen Brothers tannery "included 250 liquor vats and shipped 20,000 sides of sole leather to Cleveland each year." Additionally, the Agle & Sons tannery was expanded, containing 40 liquor vats and annually finishing 700 sides of leather by 1879.

A glue factory was originally started in association with the Gaensslen Brothers Tannery in 1874 in order to utilize the tanning waste. At that time, 30,000 pounds (14,000 kg) of glue was produced annually. The first construction of Richard Wilhelm's Eastern Tanners Glue Company plant began on May 5, 1904. In 1898, tanning factory waste from the now-reorganized Gaensslen, Fisher & Company tannery produced 300,000 to 400,000 pounds (140,000 to 180,000 kg) of glue. In 1899, the tannery was purchased by C. Moench & Sons. Although it was purchased by the Brown Shoe Company in 1925, it existed as the Moench Tanning Company, Incorporated.

==== America's glue capital ====
A 1976 historical book about Gowanda states that the Eastern Tanners Glue Company begun by Richard Wilhelm, and later purchased and operated by the Peter Cooper Corporations, was "the largest glue making plant in the world." Gowanda, therefore, was known as America's glue capital.

=== 21st century ===
The Bank of Gowanda building and Gowanda Village Historic District are listed on the National Register of Historic Places. The historic Hollywood Theatre is also located in Gowanda.

== Notable recent events ==
=== Cultural events and entertainment ===
Gowanda hosts the Hollywood Happening, bringing a focus to the historic and restored Hollywood Theatre. It lasts from Friday to Sunday, usually the first weekend in June. Main Street of Gowanda is shut down for the event, which provides parking for numerous motorcycles and beer tents. Many local Western New York rock, country, and blues bands are featured. There are also several food and merchandise vendors who sponsor and participate in the event. Attendance for the 2008 Hollywood Happening was estimated to be around 22,000 people for the entire weekend.

Beginning about 2000, the Harvest Heritage Festival has been held every year in the fall, with many local businesses and private home owners opening up their residences for historical garden tours. A scarecrow contest is also held in which local businesses compete. Afterwards, the scarecrows are hung up around town to scare the children on Halloween. Gowanda also hosts Pine Hill Cemetery tours that are free and open to the public. The events usually last two hours, and are held every weekend during the month of October at midnight. Tours include period reenactments of those buried in the cemetery, and detailed stories of their lives. A staged reenactment of the 1861 murder of Private Lee Crawford and Beulah Snyder also takes place. Locally brewed Chuck Barlow's Millhouse Cider sponsors the event, and offers refreshments during the festivities.

Parts of the 1987 comedy movie Planes, Trains and Automobiles, starring Steve Martin and John Candy, were filmed at the Gowanda Train Depot, as well as the Olympia Diner on Jamestown Street. The New York and Lake Erie Railroad, a short rail line serving northwestern Cattaraugus County, is headquartered in Gowanda and offers freight and occasional passenger service.

=== Flood of 2009 and related events ===
Throughout the years, Gowanda has regularly experienced flooding. In August 2009, a great flash flood occurred in Gowanda and devastated much of the village. One man drowned, and houses and cars were washed away. A total of two fatalities were caused directly from the flooding. During the flood, Gowanda's water reservoir at Point Peter Road was completely destroyed, leaving the village without water. It was estimated that it would take one year to rebuild the reservoir. New York State declared the village a disaster site, as did President Barack Obama. FEMA was tapped to assist the town in rebuilding. In January 2014, it was announced by Governor Andrew Cuomo that Gowanda would be compensated with $700,000 in monies from FEMA for expenses paid in rebuilding the village after the 2009 flood.

The Tri-County Memorial Hospital (Tri-County) was devastated beyond repair during the 2009 flood, and was demolished. Initial plans were to relocate the hospital to another location in Perrysburg out of the flood zone. The relocation would utilize $18.5 million in FEMA aid. TLC, the operators of Tri-County, would have needed to raise $2.3 million to fund the project. The proposal came under fire from residents of towns to the southeast, such as Cattaraugus and Little Valley, who noted that Gowanda is located less than 15 miles (24 km) from hospitals in either direction (Dunkirk and Springville), while residents of Cattaraugus and Little Valley must travel 25 miles (40 km) or more to the nearest hospital (which, until the flood, was Tri-County).

In July 2013, TLC announced it was abandoning its plans to reconstruct the hospital, noting that the existing hospitals in the region had more than enough capacity to meet demand, and would instead maintain an urgent care facility in Gowanda. Gary Rhodes, interim CEO of Lake Erie Regional Health System of New York, stated that it would not be economical to rebuild the hospital due to declining revenues, decreasing area population, and because of other hospitals within the system being nearby. The hospital's closure had a significant negative impact on the village, leading to declines at several local businesses.

=== Flood of 2014 ===
Gowanda experienced another flood, resulting in a state of emergency, when two waterways, Cattaraugus Creek and Thatcher Brook, flooded their banks in May 2014. Two elderly residents were evacuated from their homes as a safety precaution. One elderly resident was hospitalized as a result of injuries sustained when a tree fell and she was hit; her injuries were not life-threatening.

As a result of the flood, Gowanda's water reservoir was damaged and contaminated, being shut down. Residents were asked to conserve water and not use it for activities such as washing their cars. Mayor Heather McKeever stated that the most costly facet of clean-up from the flooding would likely be the reservoir's repair, with initial repair estimates of approximately $500,000 (~$650,695 in 2024). Residents pumped flood waters from their basements, and semi-truck loads of mud were hauled away as part of clean-up efforts.

Officials used a system called "Code Red" to notify residents to take precautions due to the rains. Residents were notified, electronically, at 7:30 am, and waterways had overflowed by 8:45 am. About 200 families in Gowanda were affected by the flooding, with 30 homes being flooded with water and mud. The children of Gowanda had school that day. The bus drivers were given a hard time about going on to certain closed roads.

== Notable people ==
- Albertus W. Catlin, US general
- John Elliot, songwriter
- Daniel Garnsey, former US congressman
- Joseph Giglio, New York state assemblyman
- Gregory Lamberson, film director and novelist
- Bill Paxon, former US congressman
- Jared Sidney Torrance, founder of Torrance, California

== Recreational areas ==
- Chang Hu Park – A memorial park dedicated to the late Drs. Chang and Hu who were influential in the town's planning and building process.
- McIntosh Woods – Woods located between the town of Collins and the village of Gowanda. It was named due to the now wild McIntosh apple trees which were planted for the former psychiatric facility patients to enjoy.
- Creekside Park – located along Cattaraugus Creek in the heart of Gowanda which was revitalized into a historic park area.
- Zoar Valley – A scenic valley formed by Cattaraugus Creek upstream from Gowanda.

== Correctional facilities ==
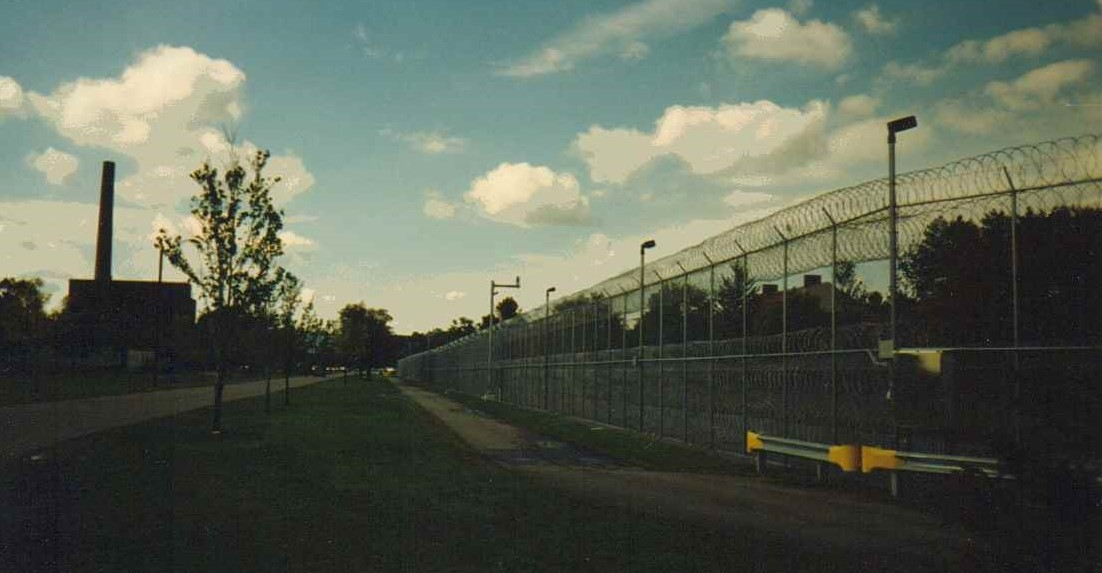
Partial view of Gowanda Correctional Facility with power plant in background at left, September 1996

Formerly the Gowanda Psychiatric Center, the Gowanda Correctional Facility, which opened in 1994, and the Collins Correctional Facility, which opened in 1982, are north of the village. They are medium security prisons, and overlook the village below.

Gowanda Correctional facility housed more than 2,300 inmates, and was the second-largest prison in New York State. It featured one of the largest sex offender counseling programs of the New York State prison system.

== Educational institutions ==
Gowanda Central School System - A public school system that includes Gowanda Central High and Middle Schools, Gowanda Elementary School, and Aldrich Street (primary) School. The high school is located to the west, just outside the village limits.

Gowanda Christian Academy also operates in the village.

Saint Joseph's School, a Roman Catholic institution, operated in the village until its closure in 2014.

== See also ==
- Collins, New York
- Zoar, New York
