= 2026 in New York =

- Decades
- See also: History of New York; 2026 in the United States

The following is a list of events of the year 2026 in New York.

== Incumbents ==
=== State government ===
- Governor: Kathy Hochul (D)

== Events ==
=== January ===
- January 1 – Zohran Mamdani is sworn in as Mayor of New York City.
- January 3
  - Governor Kathy Hochul designates January as Muslim American Heritage Month in the state, citing the largest population of Muslim Americans in the country.
  - Venezuelan President Nicolás Maduro is brought to New York to face federal charges after the American military captured him from Caracas.
- January 6 – The Department of Health and Human Services announces it is halting $10 billion in social service programs to New York and four other Democratic states.
- January 8 – District Judge Lorna G. Schofield rules that acting U.S. attorney for the Northern District of New York John Sarcone is serving unlawfully. Sarcone had issued subpoenas about lawsuits New York Attorney General Letitia James had filed against Donald Trump.
- January 12 – Thousands of nurses go on strike at several New York City hospitals, including NewYork-Presbyterian Hospital, Mount Sinai, and Montefiore Einstein Medical Center.
- January 14 – New York Attorney General Letitia James reaches a settlement with Betar US to cease intimidating pro-Palestinian protesters at protests and social media posts. Betar US also confirms plans to cease operations in New York.
- January 24 – A gas explosion occurs at a high-rise in the Bronx, killing one person and injuring 14.
- January 24–25 – January 2026 North American winter storm: Ten people die in New York City as the result of major snowstorms.
- January 30 – A judge rules federal prosecutors cannot seek the death penalty against Luigi Mangione, who is charged with killing Brian Thompson in December 2024.
- January 31–February 3 – The 150th Westminster Kennel Club Dog Show is held at Madison Square Garden.

=== February ===
- February 6 – New York City Police Sergeant Erik Duran is convicted of manslaughter in the death of Eric Duprey, who crashed after Duran threw a drink cooler at Duprey's scooter during a drug sting in 2023.
- February 9 – The National Park Service removes a pride flag from a flagpole at the Stonewall National Monument.
- February 17 – Five people, including a firefighter, are injured in a gas explosion at a Boonville church.
- February 23 – Following a large blizzard in the northeast U.S., two NYPD officers are hit by snowballs during a snowball fight at Washington Square Park. The following day, the NYPD posts on social media seeking tips for two suspects for assault on a police officer. One suspect is arrested on February 26, but the district attorney declines to bring felony charges against him.
- February 24 – Nurul Amin Shah Alam, a blind Rohingya refugee who had been reported missing in Buffalo on February 19, is found dead. Shah Alam had been detained by the United States Border Patrol following his release from jail, with officers leaving him at a coffee shop located near a previous address, though he no longer lived at that location. His death is later ruled a homicide.
- February 26 – ICE agents detain a Columbia University student from Azerbaijan in her residence hall. Acting president of Columbia Claire Shipman releases a letter saying that ICE agents "made misrepresentations to gain entry to the building". The same day, Mayor Zohran Mamdani, who is in Washington, D.C., announces that he spoke to President Trump and that the student would be released.
- February 27
  - Defense Secretary Pete Hegseth announces the DoD will no longer allow military members to attend Columbia University, among other schools.
  - The Brooklyn Public Library ends its passport application service following an order from the Department of State.

=== March ===
- March 7 – Far-right influencer and January 6 United States Capitol attack rioter Jake Lang holds a "Stop the Islamic Takeover of New York City" event outside Gracie Mansion in Manhattan. During the event, a protester sprays counter-protesters with pepper spray, and two counter-protesters throw explosive devices at protesters.
- March 16 – Four people, including a 3-year-old girl, are killed in a building fire in College Point, Queens. A man is later arrested on suspicion of arson.
- March 22 – Air Canada Express Flight 8646: A Bombardier CRJ900LR operating as an Air Canada Express flight from Montreal, Quebec, Canada, collides with a firetruck while landing at LaGuardia Airport. Both pilots are killed and 41 others are injured.
- March 23 – ICE agents are deployed to 14 airports nationwide, including John F. Kennedy International Airport and LaGuardia Airport.
- March 26 – A Hoboken, New Jersey man is arrested and charged with plotting to assassinate Nerdeen Kiswani, founder of the pro-Palestinian organization Within Our Lifetime, with Molotov cocktails. The suspect is an alleged member of the Jewish Defense League.

=== April ===
- April 1 – A New York prison guard is found guilty of manslaughter in the killing of Messiah Nantwi, who guards at Mid-State Correctional Facility in Marcy beat to death in 2025.
- April 7 – Police arrest 15 protesters after a sit-in at the Palantir office in the Chelsea neighborhood of Manhattan.
- April 8 – Rex Heuermann pleads guilty to killing seven women between 1993 and 2011 on Long Island. He also admits to killing an eighth victim.
- April 10 – A five-alarm fire engulfs a warehouse in College Point, Queens. No injuries are reported.
- April 11 – A man slashes three people with a machete at Grand Central Station. The attacker is killed by responding police officers.
- April 13
  - The 2026 WNBA draft is held at The Shed at Hudson Yards. UConn's Azzi Fudd is the first overall draft pick.
  - Police arrest 90 protesters, including former intelligence analyst Chelsea Manning, during a protest against weapon sales to Israel held on the street outside the Manhattan offices of Senators Chuck Schumer and Kirsten Gillibrand.
- April 22 – Four people, including New York City Councilman Chi Ossé, are arrested in Ossé's Brooklyn district during a protest against a woman's eviction.
- April 27 – 52-year-old James Bryant pleads guilty to murdering DJ Jam Master Jay, who was killed in his Queens studio in 2002.

=== May ===
- May 1 – Leon Botstein, the president of Bard College since 1975, announces he will retire at the end of June following scrutiny over his relationship to Jeffrey Epstein.
- May 2 – ICE agents detain a Nigerian immigrant in Bushwick, Brooklyn. Agents take him to Wyckoff Heights Medical Center, where clashes break out between protesters and NYPD officers. Eight people are arrested.
- May 4 – The Met Gala is held at the Metropolitan Museum of Art.
- May 15 – A judge declares a mistrial in the New York rape trial of Harvey Weinstein. It is the third mistrial in this case.
- May 16 – Thousands of Long Island Rail Road (LIRR) workers go on strike, shutting down rail service. An agreement is reached and the strike ends on May 19.
- May 18 – A federal judge rules that, barring exceptional circumstances, federal agents cannot make arrests in or around three Manhattan federal buildings where immigration proceedings take place.
- May 22 – One person is killed and 36 injured in an explosion at a Staten Island shipyard.
- May 27 – Governor Hochul signs a bill that prohibits local police departments from working with ICE.
- May 31 – The annual Israel Day parade is held in New York. Mayor Mamdani does not attend, the first mayor to do so since the parade's conception in 1961.

=== June ===
- June 3 – The Archdiocese of New York announces it has cut ties with Syracuse-based priest Stephen Rossetti following comments he made saying that "many, if not most" UFO sightings are the result of demons.
- June 6 – Golden Tempo wins the 2026 Belmont Stakes.
- June 7 – Six people are injured in a stabbing at New York Penn Station.
- June 8 – The San Antonio Spurs beat the New York Knicks in game 3 of the 2026 NBA Finals at Madison Square Garden (MSG). President Donald Trump attends the game, resulting in heightened security in and around MSG. 21 people are arrested after rioting breaks out near Bryant Park, where a watch party was being held.
- June 13 – The Knicks beat the Spurs in game 5 of the NBA Finals to win the series 4–1. It is the Knicks' first championship since 1973.
- June 16 – 17 horses are killed in a fire in a barn at the Saratoga Casino Hotel racetrack.
- June 18–21 – The 2026 U.S. Open is held at the Shinnecock Hills Golf Club in Southampton. Wyndham Clark wins.
- June 23 – Two ICE agents enter a polling place in Syracuse and ask one of the poll workers to remove an Instagram post she had made in January 2026. The post in question had mentioned ICE agent Jonathan Ross by name and called for charges against him in the killing of Renée Good. The same day, the same agents arrive at a Rochester home to question a man who had sent an angry email to Todd Lyons after the killing of Alex Pretti, though the man is in Finland at the time. Two days later, the same agents attempt to visit the man at a New York City hotel.
- June 23–24 – The 2026 NBA draft is held at the Barclays Center in Brooklyn. BYU's AJ Dybantsa is the first overall draft pick.
- June 24 – Frank Carone, a former Chief of Staff to ex-New York City Mayor Eric Adams, is charged in connection to a federal bribery probe. Adams is not accused of wrongdoing in Carone's indictment.
- June 25 – Six people are found dead in an apartment in Mechanicville. Police say one of the deceased likely killed her daughter, four grandchildren, and herself.
- June 26–27 – The 2026 NHL draft is held at the KeyBank Center in Buffalo. Gavin McKenna of Penn State is selected by the Toronto Maple Leafs with the first overall pick.
- June 30 – The New York Liberty beat the Las Vegas Aces 93–85 to win the second WNBA Commissioner's Cup title, becoming the first team to win multiple WNBA Commissioner's Cups.

=== July ===
- July 1 – Rooftoppers Ivan Beerkus and Angela Nikolau climb to the antenna on top of the Empire State Building, where they fly a banner with a William Ewart Gladstone quote before Beerkus proposes to Nikolau, who accepts. The two are arrested upon descending.
- July 2 – A Tibetan man sets himself on fire outside the headquarters of the United Nations in protest of China's presence in Tibet. The man is pronounced dead at a hospital.
- July 3 – Taylor Swift and Travis Kelce's wedding is held at Madison Square Garden.
- July 3–4 – The Times Square Ball drops at midnight on Independence Day in Times Square to celebrate America's 250th anniversary.
- July 7 – Two support columns of a building undergoing remodels in Midtown Manhattan begin buckling, triggering mass evacuations.
- July 8 – The Women's Pro Baseball League reveals its four inaugural teams, including the New York Heights.
- July 9 – 2 World Trade Center breaks ground in New York.
- July 14 – Hochul signs an executive order placing a one-year moratorium on large-scale data centers in the state.
- July 16 – A man is arrested and charged with hate crimes after entering 30 Rockefeller Plaza and confronting Today Show host Craig Melvin while looking for meteorologist Al Roker; both Melvin and Roker are Black.
- July 20 – A man sets off an incendiary device outside the Jacob K. Javits Federal Building, which houses an ICE office. The man is arrested at the scene.
- July 23 – Two people, one Asian and one Jewish, are stabbed in the Upper West Side. Police investigate the stabbings as a possible hate crime, with Police Commissioner Jessica Tisch saying the suspect yelled "allahu akbar" during the attacks.
- July 25 – 21 people, including 19 firefighters, are injured in a multi-alarm fire in the New York City borough ‌of Queens.

=== August ===
- August 8 – Two people, including a 5-month-old baby, are killed after a boat capsizes in New York Harbor.
- August 14 – In federal court, Luigi Mangione pleads guilty to stalking charges related to the killing of Brian Thompson.
- August 20 – The FBI announces an Albany woman was arrested for plotting to bomb the New York State Capitol. The complaint says the woman communicated with an informant posing as an ISIS facilitator and was given a gun and money to buy nail bomb ingredients by FBI agents posing as co-conspirators.
- August 27 – President Trump signs an executive order renaming Lake Ontario to "Lake America" in the United States.
- August 28 – A man sets himself on fire in the lobby of 315 Hudson Street in Manhattan. The building houses the New York offices of Google, though the company indicates they were not the target of the incident. The man survives and is charged with arson.
- August 30–September 13 – Tennis' U.S. Open is held at the USTA Billie Jean King National Tennis Center.
- August 31 – A woman stabs two people in Times Square, killing one, before being shot and killed by police. The woman killed is identified as a vice president at Bank of America.

=== September ===
- September 7 – Four people are injured in a stabbing in Brooklyn near the West Indian Day Parade route.
- September 14 – A couple resting on the tracks at Spring Street station are killed after being ran over by a train.
- September 15 – A fire at an apartment building injures six people in the Bronx.
- September 16 – Two people are stabbed during a fight at Westchester Community College in Valhalla.
- September 21
  - Flights are grounded at LaGuardia Airport and John F. Kennedy International Airport after an Amtrak construction crew accidentally cuts a fiber line in New Jersey, causing a telecom outage.
  - President Trump meets Mayor Mamdani at Gracie Mansion.
- September 23 – Harvey Weinstein is sentenced to 15 years in prison for a 2006 sexual assault.
- September 24
  - Israeli Prime Minister Benjamin Netanyahu arrives in New York City to speak at the United Nations General Assembly.
  - Over a hundred people are arrested at a protest against Netanyahu's visit, including Darializa Avila Chevalier, Glennon Doyle, Hannah Einbinder, Caleb Hearon, Chelsea Manning, Indya Moore, Chi Ossé, Susan Sarandon, Linda Sarsour, and Abby Stein.
- September 26 – A powerful nor'easter strikes the northeast United States. A New York City Housing Authority employee is killed by a falling tree in Brooklyn.
- September 28 – Tompkins County District Attorney Matthew Van Houten announces his office is reopening an investigation into a reported gang rape that occurred at Cornell University in 2024. The reopening comes after a lawsuit was filed by a former Cornell student, who alleged that seven Chi Phi fraternity members raped her in 2024 while she was under the influence of ketamine. The lawsuit also accuses Cornell of allowing the seven Chi Phi members to mitigate their suspensions by submitting essays to Cornell.

=== October ===
- October 1 – In ice hockey, New York Rangers goaltender Igor Shesterkin scores a empty-net goalie goal during the team's 5-1 home opener victory against the Tampa Bay Lightning.
- October 5 – Hundreds of protesters gather at Cornell University to protest its response to the reported 2024 gang rape.
- October 7 - Two humpback whales are rescued after beaching off Fire Island National Seashore.
- October 8 – An ICE agent shoots a Dominican national in the neck in Marble Hill, Manhattan.
- October 11 – Actress Selma Blair is arrested at John F. Kennedy International Airport for allegedly assaulting two flight attendants during a flight from Los Angeles. One flight attendant is reportedly bitten.
- October 22 – The New York City Council passes a resolution banning horse-drawn carriage rides in the city, following the death of an 18-year-old tourist who jumped from a runaway carriage in June.
- October 29 – Javits Frimpong, a 15-year-old Ghanaian immigrant, is shot and killed in the Bronx as he walks to school. A 17-year-old is later arrested.

=== November ===
- November 3 – 2026 New York state elections:
  - 2026 New York State Comptroller election
  - 2026 New York State Assembly election
  - 2026 New York Attorney General election
  - 2026 New York gubernatorial election: Kathy Hochul wins reelection, beating Bruce Blakeman.
  - 2026 New York State Senate election
  - 2026 United States House of Representatives elections in New York
- November 5 – Six people are killed and six others are injured in a residential building fire in Brooklyn, New York City.
- November 11 – A three-story apartment building collapses in Brooklyn, New York City, killing eight people and injuring 17 others.
- November 16 – Two public safety officers are shot and injured at an apartment in Co-op City, Bronx. The gunman kills himself.
- November 20 – Mayor Mamdani announces a plan to close the Rikers Island jail and relocate all inmates by 2032.

=== Sports ===
- 2025–26 New York Knicks season
- 2025–26 Buffalo Sabres season
- 2025 Buffalo Bills season
- 2026 Buffalo Bills season
- 2026 New York Mets season
- 2026 New York Yankees season
- 2025–26 Brooklyn Nets season
- 2025–26 New York Islanders season
- 2025–26 New York Rangers season

== Deaths ==
- January 9: Nessa Hyams, 84, casting director (The Exorcist, Blazing Saddles) and television director (Mary Hartman, Mary Hartman).
- March 5: Sandy Wernick, 86, film and television producer (ALF, Happy Gilmore, Def Comedy Jam).

== See also ==
- 2026 in the United States
