= Columbia strike =

Columbia strike may refer to:

- Columbia University protests of 1968, a series of protests at Columbia University over its involvement in the Vietnam War and gentrification in Harlem
- 2021 Columbia University strike, a labor strike organized by the Graduate Workers of Columbia union
