= 2021 in New York =

- Decades
- See also: History of New York; 2021 in the United States

The following is a list of events of the year 2021 in New York.

== Incumbents ==
=== State government ===
- Governor: Andrew Cuomo (D)
- Governor: Kathy Hochul (D)

== Events ==
=== January ===
- January 1:
  - The Moynihan Train Hall was opened at the western end of Pennsylvania Station.
  - The 204th New York State Legislature session started.
- January 17 – 1400 workers for the Hunts Point Produce Market in the Hunts Point neighborhood went on strike.

=== March ===
- March 15 – Graduate student workers of Columbia University went on strike.
- March 21:
  - The Marijuana Regulation and Taxation Act legalized recreational cannabis for adults statewide.
  - The Rally against hate took place in Columbus Park.
- March 30 – Workers across a Allegheny Technologies facility in Lockport went on strike.

=== April ===
- April 9 – A movement to strike the Museum of Modern Art in New York City that consisted of a series of 10 demonstrations organized over ten weeks.
- April 20 – The Xizmo v. New York City case was started that argues that New York City's drone ban renders an "inability [for Xizmo] to gather aerial imagery interfering with its directors’ artistic expression".
- April 23 – Yao Pan Ma was attacked and later died 8 months later due to a cerebral hemorrhage caused by the attack.

=== May ===
- May 20 – Joseph Borgen was assaulted and beaten while heading to a pro-Israel rally in New York City.
- May 21 – Little Island at Pier 55 opened as a public park within Hudson River Park.
- August 18 – Tropical Storm Fred brought severe flooding in Steuben County.

=== August ===
- August 6 – The 20th New York Asian Film Festival was opened.
- August 18 – The New York State Fair after being canceled in 2020, with a lengthened time of 18 days.
- August 22 – Hurricane Henri made landfall and brought record breaking rainfall to New York City.
- August 23 – Andrew Cuomo resigns from office while in the midst of an impeachment.
- August 24 – Kathy Hochul is sworn into office after the resignation of Andrew Cuomo.

=== September ===
- September 1 – Remnants of Hurricane Ida brought flash flooding emergencies to New York.
- September 11 – New York observed the 20th anniversary of the September 11 attacks with ceremonies at the World Trade Center site.
- September 12 – The 2021 MTV Video Music Awards were held at Barclays Center in New York City.
- September 13 – The Met Gala returns after being closed due to the COVID-19 pandemic.
- September 14 – Broadway theatre reopens after being closed due to the COVID-19 pandemic.
- September 21 – The General debate of the seventy-sixth session of the United Nations General Assembly was opened in New York City.

=== October ===
- October 1 – Nurses and hospital workers started a strike at Mercy Hospital in Buffalo.

=== November ===
- November 2:
  - The 2021 New York City Council election in Brooklyn was held, where 15 districts were up for election.
  - The 2021 New York City borough president elections was held where four of the five incumbent borough presidents were unable to run for reelection due to term limits.
  - The 2021 New York City Comptroller election was held where Brad Lander defeated Daby Benjaminé Carreras and Paul Rodríguez with 69.6% of the vote.
  - The 2021 New York City Council election was held where Corey Johnson defeated Steven Matteo.
  - The 2021 New York City Public Advocate election were held where Jumaane Williams defeated Devi Nampiaparampil and Anthony Herbert.
- November 3 – Graduate student workers of Columbia University went on an additional strike.
- November 7 – The 2021 New York City Marathon returns after being canceled in 2020.
- November 21 – The Survivor Series was produced by the WWE in Brooklyn.
- November 22 – The 49th International Emmy Awards ceremony took place at Casa Cipriani in New York City.
- November 26 – The 74th Tony Awards was held at Winter Garden Theatre.

=== December ===
- December 3 – The 87th New York Film Critics Circle Awards, honoring the best in film for 2021, were announced.
- December 11 – New York City FC won its first Major League Soccer title after defeating the Portland Timbers.

== See also ==
- 2021 in the United States
