= Phaedra Perry =

American politician

Phaedra F. Perry

Acting Justice of the New York State Supreme Court in the 1st Judicial district
- In office January 1, 2024 – December 31, 2027

Justice of the Family Court of the City of Bronx County, New York
- Incumbent
- Assumed office January 1, 2018

Personal details
- Party: Democrat
- Occupation: Attorney, Judge

Phaedra F. Perry, who also uses the name Phaedra F. Perry-Bond, is an American lawyer and judge who has been a justice of the New York Supreme Court for the 1st Judicial District (Manhattan) since 2024. A Democrat and a veteran of the United States Air Force, she was previously elected to the Civil Court of the City of New York in 2017. As a Manhattan trial judge she has presided over several widely reported civil cases, including Sean Combs's defamation suit against NBCUniversal and a civil suit arising from the 2024 Cornell University rape allegations.

== Early life and career ==
Before becoming a lawyer, Perry served six years on active duty in the United States Air Force. She later worked in human resources for the Federal Bureau of Prisons and the Internal Revenue Service, as well as in the private sector.

Perry graduated from law school in 2002. She spent about a year as an associate at a law firm representing employers in employment disputes, then worked as a court attorney in the Resolution Part of the New York City Housing Court and as an assistant district attorney in Westchester County. Beginning in 2005 she was special counsel to the Deputy Chief Administrative Judge of the Civil Court in New York County, and she remained a court attorney until her election to the bench.

She is a member of the Association of Black Women Attorneys.

== Political career ==
Perry was elected to the Civil Court of the City of New York in 2018. Soon after, she was designated as Judge of the Family Court of the City of New York (Bronx County) by Chief Administrative Judge Lawrence K. Marks.

In 2023, Perry won the general election for a Supreme Court Justice seat in the 1st Judicial District. She was unopposed.

== Judicial career ==
In the November 2017 general election, Perry and Richard Tsai were elected without opposition to the two open countywide seats on the Civil Court of the City of New York in New York County. Before that election the New York City Bar Association rated her "Not Approved" for the Civil Court. Her ten-year Civil Court term began in 2018.

As a Civil Court judge she was assigned outside that court. Chief Administrative Judge Lawrence K. Marks designated her to the Family Court of the City of New York in Bronx County, where she heard juvenile delinquency cases under New York's "Raise the Age" legislation as well as custody and family offense matters. According to a 2023 profile she was first assigned to Bronx Criminal Court, and before her elevation she returned to the Civil Court to hear guardianship proceedings and personal injury summary jury and bench trials. In 2023 Acting Chief Administrative Judge Tamiko Amaker designated her an Acting Justice of the Supreme Court in New York County.

In 2023 the Manhattan Democratic judicial convention nominated Perry for one of three open seats on the New York Supreme Court in the 1st Judicial District. The New York City Bar Association rated her "Approved" for that office. She, Lyle Frank and Leslie A. Stroth were elected without opposition on November 7, 2023, with Perry receiving 103,587 votes. She took office on January 1, 2024, and presides over IAS Part 35 of the Supreme Court, New York County, at 60 Centre Street.

== Notable cases ==
In July 2025 Perry declined the city's request to lift a temporary restraining order, obtained by the Police Benevolent Association, that blocked the New York City Police Department from firing 30 recently hired officers (the department had initially put the number at 31) with 24 hours' notice after the department concluded they had been improperly approved during hiring. At the hearing she questioned whether the short notice was fair to the officers, whom she described as human beings whose livelihoods were at stake.

On January 6, 2026 she dismissed a $5 million lawsuit brought by stylist Misa Hylton against Mary J. Blige, holding that Hylton's failure to oppose Blige's motion to dismiss "constitutes the abandonment" of her claims. She declined to impose sanctions but wrote that "the court in no way condones parties filing lawsuits claiming millions in damages based on inflammatory accusations, only to have those very same parties abandon their allegations when faced with a motion to dismiss and sanctions."

On April 20, 2026 Perry dismissed Sean Combs's $100 million defamation lawsuit against NBCUniversal, Peacock and Ample Entertainment over the documentary Diddy: The Making of a Bad Boy under New York's anti-SLAPP statute. She found that Combs had not shown a substantial basis for reputational harm, noting that his reputation had already been "tarnished by the numerous lawsuits, domestic violence video, press coverage, and a criminal indictment prior to the Documentary's publication", and described the film as "carefully curated and nuanced". On October 6, 2026 she ordered Combs to pay $477,700.50 of the defendants' attorneys' fees, less than half of the $990,292 they had requested.

In August 2026, ruling on a suit brought by the city's Commission on Racial Equity, she held that Mayors Eric Adams and Zohran Mamdani had both violated the New York City Charter by failing to issue racial equity plans on schedule, and she allowed the commission to retain outside counsel at city expense.

Perry presides over the civil lawsuit arising from the 2024 Cornell University rape allegations. On October 9, 2026, after a man who shares a name with one of the defendants reported threats against his family because his address had been wrongly listed in a filing, she ordered the complaint and other filings containing addresses sealed and directed that redacted versions be filed, writing that the court "strongly condemns the reported acts of threats and doxing, which can only be characterized as brash, reckless, and ultimately dangerous internet vigilantism." On October 16, 2026 she denied a defendant's request for a gag order on the parties and their lawyers, holding that it did not meet First Amendment requirements and expressing concern that it was a "sideshow" distracting from the merits; she also struck an email exhibit she characterized as "mudslinging" and warned counsel that similar conduct could lead to sanctions.
