= 2027 in New York =

- Decades
- See also: History of New York; 2027 in the United States

The following is a list of events of the year 2027 in New York.

== Events ==
=== Planned or predicted ===
- February 6 – 2027 National Hockey League All-Star Game.
- July 2027 – Planned opening of Etihad Park.
