= Xizmo v. New York City =

Unmanned aerial vehicles legal case

Xizmo Media Productions LLC v. City of New York
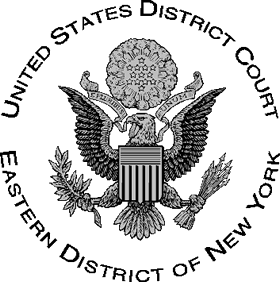
- Court: United States District Court for the Eastern District of New York
- Full case name: Xizmo Media Productions LLC v. City of New York
- Started: April 20, 2021
- Decided: June 5, 2023
- Citation: 1:21-cv-02160

Outcome
- Settled

Court membership
- Judge sitting: Eric N. Vitaliano

Xizmo Media Productions LLC v. City of New York was a United States federal court case where the company Xizmo Media Productions argued that New York City's "Avigation" law, which was in effect a ban on unmanned aerial vehicles (commonly known as "drones") within New York City, violated the First Amendment to the United States Constitution. Xizmo argued that New York City's drone ban rendered an "inability [for Xizmo] to gather aerial imagery interfering with its directors’ artistic expression". The lawsuit took place in the United States District Court for the Eastern District of New York, before federal judge Eric N. Vitaliano.

In August 2022, Vitaliano denied the city’s motion to dismiss the case. On June 5, 2023, the city settled the case with Xizmo, granting them permission to operate drones. In July 2023, the New York City Police Department (NYPD) announced new rules for operating drones in the city via a permitting process.

== Background ==
New York City passed its "Avigation" law in 1948, which stated:

It shall be unlawful for any person avigating an aircraft to take off or land, except in an emergency, at any place within the limits of the city other than places of landing designated by the department of transportation or the port of New York authority.

New York City's website additionally advises that people who see drones within New York call 9-1-1. Xizmo argues that the Federal Aviation Administration, not the City of New York, has jurisdiction over all airspace in the country, and by extension the airspace over New York City, and only it can enact restrictions on where drones can be flown. Xizmo has previously been cited by New York City police for failure to obey the New York City drone ban. Despite its operators having a part 107 remote pilot certificate, various FAA waivers, and an FAA permit to operate small UAVs "in class B airspace under the jurisdiction of New York's Kennedy Airport Control and LaGuardia Airport Traffic Control", Xizmo was cited and fined under the Avigation law, which it argues the City's interpretation is excessively "expansive".

The core of Xizmo's argument was that New York City's drone ban not only violated FAA precedent but violated the First Amendment by excessively restricting the right to artistic expression through the use of drones for the purpose of aerial photography and videography.

== Failed motion to dismiss ==
New York City initially attempted to dismiss the lawsuit, arguing that the Avigation Law did not prohibit drones outright, but merely regulated where they could take off and land. The city also argued that the safety of its residents would be jeopardized by drones, given the presence of skyscrapers and tall buildings within the city. The city argued that the Avigation Law did not prohibit drones since the city allowed drone take off and landings to five designated sites in city parks, in Brooklyn, Queens, and Staten Island.

Judge Vitaliano declined the motion to dismiss on August 29, 2022, stating that Xizmo's claims were plausible enough to proceed to discovery. While Vitaliano rejected Xizmo's broadest claim that federal law leaves no room at all for local drone regulation, noting that the FAA itself has said some drone matters are appropriately handled by state and local governments, he found it plausible that the Avigation Law conflicted with federal law in practice. He argued that FAA rules require drone operators to keep the drone within eyesight, a law prohibiting take-offs and landings everywhere except a handful of designated sites effectively made drone flight impossible across most of the city. The only arguably designated sites were five model aircraft fields in city parks, none of which were in or near Manhattan, thus essentially banning operation of drones.

Vitaliano also found that aerial filmmaking plausibly qualified as protected expression, under the United States Constitution’s first amendment. He argued that "just as holding a protest calling for “an end to the violence and conflict in communities of color” on Randall’s Island cannot communicate the same message as holding the identical protest march on Malcolm X Boulevard in Harlem, filming in the five remote Brooklyn, Queens, and Staten Island locations cannot communicate the same message as filming in Manhattan." Brendan Schulman, an executive at Boston Dynamics and the former vice president of policy at drone manufacturer DJI, posted Vitaliano's decision on Twitter.

== Settlement ==
On June 5, 2023, Xizmo and the city settled the lawsuit. Under the settlement, the city agreed to a temporary permitting process under which the New York City Police Department (NYPD) would issue Xizmo permits for videography drone flights until general rules were adopted.

The day after the settlement, the city announced proposed rules to establish a general permitting process for drone take-offs and landings. The rules, codified as Chapter 24 of Title 38 of the Rules of the City of New York, took effect on July 21, 2023. Under the new system, the NYPD, in partnership with the New York City Department of Transportation, accepts applications from the public for permits authorizing take-offs and landings of FAA-registered unmanned aircraft throughout the five boroughs.

== See also ==
- RaceDayQuads v. FAA, a case which unsuccessfully challenged the FAA's Remote ID rule
