= 2024 Cornell University rape allegations =

Alleged sex crime in Ithaca, New York, US

- The Chi Phi Lodge at Cornell University
- Date: October 19–20, 2024 (incident); September 16, 2026 (lawsuit)
- Location: Cornell University, Ithaca, New York, US; 42.44366°N 76.4889°W
- Participants: Jane Doe (unnamed female student), Cornell University, Chi Phi fraternity, Tompkins County District Attorney's Office
- Outcome: Active; criminal investigation reopened for grand jury review
- Inquiries: Cornell University Title IX office investigation
- Litigation: Civil lawsuit filed by Doe against Cornell University and seven Chi Phi members (ongoing)

A former Cornell University student alleged that she was drugged and gang-raped by seven students at Cornell's Chi Phi fraternity house on campus on the evening of October 19–20, 2024. She reported the alleged incident to the police and to the university that year. On September 16, 2026, under the pseudonym Jane Doe, she filed a civil lawsuit against the university, its Chi Phi fraternity chapter, seven student members of the fraternity, her sorority Delta Delta Delta, and others, alleging that Cornell failed to protect her and punish the alleged perpetrators.

Doe reported the incident to Cornell University Police on November 8, 2024. After receiving a six–page summary of Doe's police interview, Tompkins County district attorney Matthew Van Houten declined to present the case to a grand jury; consequently, none of the accused were charged with a crime. From January to May 2025, Cornell conducted a Title IX investigation and at least twelve hearings, resulting in the expulsion of two students and the closure of the Chi Phi chapter, which was permanently barred from campus. The other accused students faced other sanctions, such as suspensions, disciplinary probation, and writing reflection papers.

Since the case was filed in 2026, Doe's allegations have attracted national media and political attention. Following a media outcry, New York governor Kathy Hochul called for a transparent and independent review of Cornell's response and appointed New York attorney general Letitia James as special prosecutor. The student defendants are often referred to by the media as the "Cornell 7".

== Alleged gang rape ==
At around 8:30 p.m. on October 19, 2024, "Jane Doe", a 20-year-old student at Cornell University and member of the Delta Delta Delta sorority, attended a sorority social event at a bar in Ithaca, New York. She had drunk vodka at her sorority house before traveling to the bar with the chapter's house mother. She alleged that the bar staff were aware that she was below the legal drinking age in the United States (21), drawing an "X" mark on both of her hands to indicate this, but that she was served and drank at least one alcoholic beverage there.

Doe and her sorority co-members walked to another bar. According to Doe, by 11 p.m., she had drunk approximately ten drinks in three hours and was "visibly drunk". She walked about 1 mile (1.6 km) from the bar to visit a male friend, a member of the school's Chi Phi chapter, at the fraternity house.

According to Doe, after she entered the fraternity house, the male friend gave her another beer, and after they had danced together, he proposed a threesome with a second man. She consumed marijuana, rum, and ketamine with the men before engaging in sexual activity. She alleged that the two men forced sex on her without her consent, and that she was "incapable of consenting" due to her intoxication. She reportedly developed bruising as a result of the sexual activity and said she was pressured to consume the ketamine. She noted that it was her first time consuming the drug. She later engaged in further sexual activity with one of these men and a third man that entered the room.

Later that night, at around 1:42 a.m., some of the men exchanged Snapchat messages in a group chat called "Chi Phi Actives" saying that there was "free pussy" upstairs, in reference to Doe. At one point, a photo of Doe was sent to the chat, in which she appeared to be smiling with a man; immediately before this, Doe's male friend wrote: "Like you can walk in and whip it out. [...] Boys come whip it out." Another man also allegedly asked, "Shop still open?" immediately after the image was sent, receiving an affirmative reply.

As four additional men entered the room, Doe was "horrified" and hid under the covers of the bed. According to her 2024 report, these men reportedly ingested ketamine and a majority of them left after making additional advances. At various points, she allegedly told some of them that she was "uncomfortable" and "tired". As the majority of the men left, two of the men removed her to another room.

At Cornell’s Title IX hearing in May 2025, Doe alleged that during the final encounter these two men were "just raping" her as she was "in and out of consciousness". She described this as her "worst" experience of the night. She also told the police in her earlier police interview that during that encounter her eyes were "looking in different directions" and she became "completely numb to the situation". Both the 2024 and 2026 accounts alleged rape during the later encounters. In her 2026 lawsuit, she alleged that she had "lost consciousness" around 5:45 a.m., and added the allegation that some of the men pressured her to consume additional ketamine until she became "completely incapacitated".

== Aftermath ==
In documents from Cornell's Title IX investigation, one of Doe's roommates testified that in the morning after the incident, she was seemingly in shock and trying to laugh off what had transpired. According to another roommate, Doe told her, "I wasn't comfortable." On October 21, one of the accused men texted her to apologize for "how things went down" and said his memory was "kinda fuzzy". Doe replied that "non [sic] of the sexual stuff was illegal" and that she had liked being with him and the other man in the initial encounter. She also said that her memory was "super clouded too", assured him that they were amicable, and suggested that they could smoke substances together again, though she requested to "leave out the extra 5 billion men and ketamine".

On October 22, Doe told a university doctor that she had contracted a urinary tract infection "in a traumatic way" and sought testing for sexually transmitted diseases; allegedly, she was advised to "speak with somebody" and was not offered expert consultation or a rape kit. That same day, she wrote one of the men that in two months it all would be a funny memory.

The Title IX record contains an interview with one of the accused men where he allegedly confirmed that he spoke to Doe, convincing her not to "spread any rumors" about the incident. He is also quoted as saying that he and his fraternity co-members were "in the idea of just deny" if asked about the events of that night. Doe maintained friendly correspondence with her male friend until a week following the incident, when she read a comment in an online forum about the fraternity, referring to people who had "gang raped a sophomore".

Her male friend had assured her that she was welcome at the fraternity's annual Halloween party, which she had been eager to attend. However, before Halloween, the fraternity's president phoned Doe to inform her that she was excluded from the party. On November 3, she texted two of the accused men and alleged that "90% of what happened that night was not consensual". On November 7, Doe went to an emergency room in Ithaca and requested a rape kit. A rape kit was administered; however it yielded no evidence of rape or foreign DNA. Doe's lawyer stated that DNA would have likely been recovered had the test been administered earlier. On November 8, 2024, Doe reported these alleged assaults to Cornell University Police with the encouragement of her friends.

Cornell's Chi Phi chapter was notified of their suspension on the same day that Doe reported her allegations to the police. Text messages sent to a small group chat, as verified by ABC News, showed Doe's male friend asking his co-members: "What's the plan of action? Should I call [Jane Doe]? I don't think she would have reported this." Within the chat, the fraternity members attempted to figure out what party was being referenced in their suspension notice; the one on October 19 with Doe and another on the 25th were mentioned as possibilities. On November 10, Doe made a phone call to her male friend, which she recorded. In it, she told him that she had sustained physical injuries from the alleged assaults and wanted to understand how the events of the night happened. He claimed that she had said she was sober on the night of the incident, while she insisted that she had not. She also asked him why so many men entered the bedroom in which the sexual activity took place. "The door was just unlocked…the party was sort of like crowded…there was nowhere else to go", he replied, not mentioning that he had sent messages inviting his Chi Phi co-members to enter.

Via Snapchat, the male friend allegedly asked a woman to submit "proof that [Doe] lied"; she replied, "I don't have evidence." She later showed the request to Doe, who reported it to the university.

Jane Doe's attorney, Thomas Giuffra, told CNN that Doe's home was swatted on October 6, 2026, after authorities received a bogus tip that "someone was killing people in the house" that evening. Giuffra told the BBC that Doe is taking trauma therapy, and does not feel safe within her house.

== Investigations and court cases ==
Upon Doe's report on November 8, Cornell immediately issued a temporary suspension to the Chi Phi chapter, as well as suspensions to the seven students concerned over alleged violations of the school's Student Code of Conduct.

=== 2024 police investigation ===
Doe was first interviewed by the Cornell University Police from November 14 to 15, 2024. This reportedly produced a 120-page transcript, which was obtained by CBS News in 2026. They quoted Doe as saying, "I can say with 100% confidence I was raped", and providing detailed accusations within the document.

After receiving a six-page summary of Doe's statement prepared by campus police in 2024, Tompkins County district attorney Matthew Van Houten declined to present the case to a grand jury, and none of the accused were charged with a crime. After Doe's civil lawsuit was filed in September 2026, the district attorney's office received criticism over its decision to not pursue criminal charges. Van Houten defended his office's decision, writing in a public statement:

Jane Doe's sworn statement in November of 2024 did not allege that she was drugged against her will or gang raped. On the contrary, Jane Doe’s statement described her participation in drug use and sexual conduct as voluntary, conscious, and consensual.

...

Finally, there is no evidence in Jane Doe's statement indicating that she clearly expressed that she did not consent to the act. According to the statement, each time Jane Doe asked to stop the sexual conduct, the sexual conduct stopped. Thus, with no evidence of a "lack of consent", criminal charges simply could not be sustained. To instruct otherwise would have been to violate my prosecutorial obligations under New York State Law.

The summary has been interpreted differently by some news sources. NPR's Jaclyn Diaz argued that "several" instances of Doe saying that she did not consent to certain activities and was "increasingly" intoxicated as the evening progressed could be found within the condensed version. According to The New York Times, the police-prepared summary retained Doe's allegations that she "felt some of that night's events were a crime" but omitted "some of the more forceful and definitive language she used", including her explicit assertion that she had been raped. The View's Sunny Hostin, a former federal prosecutor specializing in child sex crimes, obtained Doe's original statement and said "there is no way, according to her statement in 2024, that any prosecutor would have brought the case".

=== Cornell Title IX investigation ===
Cornell commenced a formal Title IX investigation on January 14, 2025. Subsequently, the office conducted at least twelve hearings addressing Doe's accusations in May 2025. For one of the hearings, Cornell prepared a 99-page report regarding the incident. Investigators reportedly conducted 50 interviews with 32 witnesses. The woman who received the male friend's request for exonerating evidence told investigators that Doe had been consistent in alleging that she had been subjected to non-consensual sexual activity, and that the male friend previously tried to convince her that Doe was lying.

Two of the accused men were expelled from Cornell. One of them—the male friend that Doe had originally gone to visit on October 19—was found responsible for sexual assault. Cornell's investigative panel judged that he had been "willing to manipulate, exploit and endanger Jane Doe for his own self-interest and the entertainment of others" on the night of the incident. The other expelled man had sent the Snapchat message encouraging other fraternity members to enter the room in which Doe was undressed.

One of the accused men allegedly entered the room following the Snapchat message and left after consuming ketamine off of Doe's body. He was found responsible by the Title IX investigation for "attempted sexual exploitation" but not sexual assault. During the hearing, he made an apology towards Doe: "I was sorry that maybe if it wasn't consensual and she was victimized, I was sorry for not stopping it. And that I'm sorry I couldn't tell if she was under the influence ... just sorry that I felt like if something actually bad happened, I didn't stop it."

Another two were suspended and given disciplinary probation. They were also required to study sexual harassment and write reflection papers. Similarly, another pair of men were required to study sexual harassment, social media use, and bystander intervention, as well as write reflection papers. All of these four were forbidden from contacting Doe. One man who had already graduated from Cornell at the time of the hearing was barred from entering the university campus for three years.

One of the men who was found responsible for the lesser offense of "attempted sexual exploitation" but not sexual assault later filed a petition to annul Cornell's decision, arguing that it was "unfair"; his appeal was denied in early 2026. The failed petition publicized details relevant to his involvement in the case. Among these details, Cornell's investigative panel concluded in its 2025 hearing that his Snapchat message on the night of the incident indicated understanding of a "sexual situation involving a female" when he chose to enter the room and that the record supported the finding of "attempted sexual exploitation". They did not find sufficient evidence that he had been using ketamine. During the alleged gang rape, he had gone upstairs upon receiving the "free pussy" message and later told the chat's other members that it was "not a bit" upon confirming Doe's presence in the room. "I shouldn't have said it. And it is immature and a stupid text message for sure", he stated at the hearing, insisting that he had merely been "following along with what everyone else was saying".

=== 2026 civil lawsuit ===
Almost two years after the alleged events, Jane Doe filed a civil lawsuit in New York State court on September 16, 2026, against Cornell University, its Chi Phi fraternity chapter, her sorority Delta Delta Delta, seven student members of the Chi Phi fraternity, and other defendants. Doe alleged that she was drugged and gang-raped by the seven students at the Chi Phi fraternity house in 2024.

One of the defendants was dropped from the lawsuit in October 2026, as the complaint had mistakenly identified him as the Chi Phi fraternity chapter president in 2024. Another defendant moved to dismiss the accusations against him in October 2026, arguing that although the plaintiff's complaint collectively accuses seven students of sexual assault and rape, the only allegation made against him is that he non-consensually kissed her, and that the statute of limitations had already passed.

=== 2026 criminal case re-evaluation ===
In September 2026, Van Houten said he would consider presenting the case to a grand jury despite his refusal to do so in 2024 and said that he had not seen the full police transcript at the time containing the explicit rape accusation. On September 28, prosecutors stated they would reopen the investigation. The next day, New York governor Kathy Hochul called for a transparent and independent review of Cornell's response. Ithaca mayor Robert G. Cantelmo called for an "immediate moratorium on all student event and special event permits" due to the ongoing lawsuit. The office of state attorney general Letitia James began reviewing the university's response to the allegations.

On October 1, Hochul announced that state attorney general Letitia James would be the special prosecutor in the investigation. Hochul's announcement came as she "lost faith in the Tompkins County DA's ability to fairly oversee" the investigation, referring to Van Houten. As special prosecutor, James was given the ability to prosecute any offenses that arise from the investigation, and present evidence to a grand jury.

== Defendants' statements ==
Following Doe's 2026 complaint and the publication of the defendants' names, the defendants have attracted significant public scrutiny; some made statements to the media. Through his attorney, one of the accused men denied "touch[ing] the plaintiff in any way" and called Doe's allegations "selfishly false". A second defendant acknowledged that "misconduct" had occurred and confirmed that he had "thoughtlessly" sent one of the Snapchat messages included in the complaint, but denied participating in any sexual activity or drug use at the time of the incident. The latter's attorney, Jeremy Saland, told NBC News that the defendant "participated in a group chat whose content was ugly and reprehensible, and he regrets it" but argued that his activity in the chat did not prove that he engaged in sexual assault. On October 2, a third defendant's attorney, Andrew Miltenberg, told NewsNation's Chris Cuomo that his client had only been in the room with Doe for "less than 20 minutes", had consensual sex with her, and saw no reason to believe she had been incapacitated.

One of the accused told Title IX investigators that he was too intoxicated to consent and described himself as the victim.

The bar named as a defendant in Doe's 2026 complaint denied selling alcohol to her on the night of October 19, 2024.

Lawyers representing one of the accused have asked for a gag order on the allegations.

== Reactions ==
Student protest at Cornell University's Ho Plaza, October 5, 2026

On September 26, 2026, student journalists at The Cornell Daily Sun revealed the names of the seven students, after reporter Cereese Qusba's background research on Cornell's policies.

The newspaper's September 18 story reported the allegations in Doe's civil complaint. The allegations received considerable attention online, with several commenters criticizing Cornell University's handling of the case. CNN reported that the case refocused attention on the issue of campus sexual assault. The accused men became colloquially known as the "Cornell 7", which earned some criticism due to its similarity to that of the Central Park Five case.

The Korea Times reported that the case has been receiving considerable attention in South Korean and Korean American online communities because one of the accused men has ties to South Korea. Some commentators drew perceived parallels between the Cornell allegations and Korea's Burning Sun scandal, due to the role of private group chats as well as questions of institutional accountability being raised in both scandals.

Former Cornell instructor Lin Farley, who is credited for coining the term "sexual harassment" in the 1970s, told Newsweek that Doe's allegations did not surprise her. Characterizing Cornell as a "big fraternity university", she alleged that the school "[doesn't] do anything except support the fraternities". She also expressed that she believes "nothing" will change at Cornell, though she has "faith" in Hochul regarding this particular case.

On October 2, 2026, Stars and Stripes reported that a Marine Corps sergeant’s family has been subjected to abuse after the service member was erroneously served with a lawsuit intended for one of the accused, because the two share the same name. The Marine had never attended Cornell and was serving on active duty in the Marine Corps at the time of the alleged October 2024 assault. Camp Lejeune officials have released a statement clarifying he was not the individual named in the lawsuit.

US president Donald Trump has criticized the appointment of Letitia James as special prosecutor for the case and said that "Cornell's a fine school, and I'm sure they'll do what's right".

Following widespread public interest and the release of details from the civil lawsuit in late 2026, online doxxing attempts, death threats, targeted harassment, and efforts to expose the plaintiff's identity led to the creation of the digital solidarity campaign "I am Jane Doe." The movement was organized to protect the plaintiff's privacy and to prevent her name from being publicized.

Michael Kotlikoff, the president of Cornell, release an eight-minute long video on October 4 that described the allegations as "deeply disturbing" and said the university "must do better". He later announced a ban of fraternity parties at Cornell.

On October 28, Netflix announced an installment of its documentary series Instadocs that released the next day, titled Instadocs: Jane Doe v. Cornell.

=== Calls for legal reform ===
In his September 2026 press statement, Van Houten repeatedly emphasized that the accuser had knowingly consumed intoxicating substances on the night of the incident. Although Van Houten did not explicitly refer to the New York state law known as the "voluntary intoxication loophole" in his statement, multiple sources connected it to the aforementioned law because of similar language being used. In response to the Cornell case, New York senator Lea Webb urged the State Assembly to approve a proposed bill also endorsed by Jeffrey Dinowitz and Nathalia Fernandez, where "a conviction could occur if it is demonstrated that a person reasonably should have known the accuser was incapacitated and unable to consent", regardless of how the accuser became incapacitated.
