= 2023 in New York =

- Decades
- See also: History of New York; 2023 in the United States

The following is a list of events of the year 2023 in New York.

== Incumbents ==
=== State government ===
- Governor: Kathy Hochul (D)

== Events ==
=== January ===
- January 1 – Three officers with the New York City Police Department are wounded in a machete attack during New Year's Eve celebrations in Times Square. The suspect, a 19-year-old male from Maine, is also wounded and has been arrested, with jihadist motives being suspected.
- January 10 – The New York City Criminal Court sentences former Trump Organization chief financial officer Allen Weisselberg to five months in the infirmary unit of Rikers Island for tax fraud and tax evasion.
- January 12-22 – The 2023 Winter World University Games was held in Lake Placid.
- January 13 – The New York County Courthouse issues the maximum allowable $1.6 million fine on the Trump Organization, former president Donald Trump's conglomerate, for tax fraud, conspiracy, and falsifying business records.
- January 28 – Louisville, New York bus-truck crash: Six people are killed and three others are injured in a collision between a bus and a truck in Louisville.

=== February ===
- February 13 – A man intentionally strikes cyclists and scooter riders with a U-Haul truck in Manhattan, killing a 44-year-old man and injuring eight people.
- February 15 – 2022 Buffalo shooting: Payton Gendron receives ten life sentences without the possibility of parole for the mass shooting at a supermarket in Buffalo, which killed ten people.

=== March ===
- March 5 – Two people are killed and nine others are injured in a human stampede at a GloRilla concert in Rochester.
- March 30 – A grand jury in Manhattan, New York City, indicts former U.S. President Donald Trump regarding a hush payment he made while he was a candidate in 2016.

=== April ===
- April 18 – 2023 New York City parking garage collapse: One person is killed and five others are injured by the partial collapse of a parking garage in Manhattan. Nearby buildings of Pace University are evacuated due to the instability of the garage's remaining structure.

=== May ===
- May 31 – The tapes for a long lost, unreleased John Coltrane live album with Eric Dolphy are found at the New York Public Library for the Performing Arts.

=== June ===
- June 6 – Air quality in New York City becomes the worst in the world, with air pollution levels reaching more than 400 on the Air quality index due to the 2023 Canadian wildfires.

=== July ===
- July 9 – One person is killed and an unknown number of others are missing as a result of floods caused by torrential rains in Hudson Valley.
- July 14 – Gilgo Beach serial killings: A suspect in the Long Island serial murders is arrested in Massapequa Park.

=== August ===
- August 2 – A man is charged after crashing a stolen Hyundai Tucson car that injured 10 pedestrians during a police chase near the Grand Central Terminal in New York City.
- August 4 – Kai Cenat Union Square giveaway: Civil unrest and rioting occur in Manhattan, after Twitch streamer and YouTuber Kai Cenat announces a gift card and PlayStation 5 video game console giveaway in Union Square.

=== September ===
- September 19 – Seventy-eighth session of the United Nations General Assembly: The general debate of the United Nations General Assembly opens at the UN Headquarters in New York City.
- September 21 – Two people are killed and more than 40 others are injured when a bus rolls over in Wawayanda.
- September 29 – September 2023 New York floods: New York City declares a state of emergency due to widespread flooding caused by heavy rain.

=== October ===
- October 29 – Antisemitic threats are made toward Jewish students at Cornell University in Ithaca.

=== November ===
- November 5 – 2023 New York City Marathon
- November 10 – Hundreds of protesters, led by a group of media workers calling themselves Writers Bloc, occupy the lobby of The New York Times office in New York City, accusing the newspaper of bias towards Israel in its coverage of the ongoing Gaza war.
- November 22 – 2023 Rainbow Bridge explosion: A car explodes near the Canada–United States border at the Rainbow Bridge in Niagara Falls, New York, killing the two people inside the vehicle and injuring a border agent. The New York state government temporarily closes all border crossings between the United States and Canada in Western New York in response to the explosion.
- November 23 – Pro-Palestine protesters disrupt the Macy's Thanksgiving Day Parade in New York City minutes after the start of the parade. The parade resumes after the protesters are taken into custody.

=== December ===
- December 3 – A man kills four of his family members and injures another in a mass stabbing in Queens. He also injures two responding police officers before they shoot him dead.
- December 6 – Power from the first turbine of the South Fork Wind Farm began being delivered to the grid on December 6, 2023.

== See also ==
- 2023 in the United States
