= 2000 in New York =

- Decades
- See also: History of New York; 2000 in the United States

The following is a list of events of the year 2000 in New York.

== Incumbents ==
=== State government ===
- Governor: George Pataki (R)

== Events ==
=== January ===
- January 4 – Bill Belichick resigns as head coach of the New York Jets after just one day to accept a head coaching job for the Patriots.
- January 11 – The New York v. Hill case was decided that a trial date outside the IAD's statutory time frame constituted a waiver of the defendant's right to dismissal on speedy-trial grounds.
- January 23 – The WWE Royal Rumble was hosted at Madison Square Garden.

=== February ===
- February 15 – Unit 2 of the Indian Point Energy Center experienced a Steam Generator Tube Rupture, which allowed primary water to leak into the secondary system through one of the steam generators. All four steam generators were subsequently replaced.
- February 19 – The Rose Center for Earth and Space reopened after it closed and got demolished in 1997.

=== March ===
- March 8–14 – The New York Underground Film Festival was held.

=== May ===
- May 24 – A mass murder that took place in a Wendy's. Seven employees were shot in the head and five of them died.
- May 25 – The Optional Protocol on the Involvement of Children in Armed Conflict and the Optional Protocol on the Sale of Children, Child Prostitution and Child Pornography took place in New York City.

=== June ===
- June 4 – The 54th Annual Tony Awards was held at Radio City Music Hall and broadcast by CBS.
- June 11 – Over fifty women reported being harassed or assaulted at the Puerto Rican Day Parade.
- June 20 – Amanda Milan was murdered in the street near the Port Authority Bus Terminal in New York City.

=== August ===
- August 5 – Nearly 85,000 unionized Verizon workers went on strike to protest Verizon's plan to shut down their factory and move to non-union areas.
- August 28–31 – The Millennium Peace Summit of Religious and Spiritual Leaders was held in New York City.

=== September ===
- September 7 – The 2000 MTV Video Music Awards was hosted by Marlon and Shawn Wayans at Radio City Music Hall in New York City.
- September 6–8 – The Millennium Summit, which was the largest modern meeting among world leaders was held at the United Nations headquarters in New York City.
- September 17 – The WCW Fall Brawl took place from the HSBC Arena in Buffalo.

=== October ===
- October 8 – Two molotov cocktails were thrown, but did not ignite, at the door of the Conservative Synagogue Adath Israel of Riverdale.
- October 21–26 – For the first time since 1956, the New York Yankees and the New York Mets faced off in the World Series with the Yankees winning 4 to 1.
- October 22 – An event by the WWF took place at the Pepsi Arena in Albany.

=== November ===
- November 7:
  - Al Gore won the electoral votes of the state in the 2000 United States presidential election in New York.
  - Hillary Clinton defeated Rick Lazio in the 2000 United States Senate election in New York.
  - All 31 seats were up for reelection in the 2000 United States House of Representatives elections in New York.

=== December ===
- December 12 – The Protocol Against the Smuggling of Migrants by Land, Sea and Air and the Protocol to Prevent, Suppress and Punish Trafficking in Persons, Especially Women and Children was signed in New York City.
- December 13 – The 66th New York Film Critics Circle Awards, honoring the best in film for 2000, were announced.
- December 27 – A significant winter storm impacted the Mid-Atlantic and New England regions, causing heavy snowfall and flight cancellations.

== See also ==
- 2000 in the United States
