= 2025 in New York =

- Decades
- See also: History of New York; 2025 in the United States

The following is a list of events of the year 2025 in New York.

== Incumbents ==
=== State government ===
- Governor: Kathy Hochul (D)

== Events ==
=== January ===
- January 1 – Ten people are wounded in a shooting at a memorial outside a nightclub in Jamaica, Queens, New York City, New York.
- January 5 – New York City enacts a congestion charge for vehicles entering Lower and Midtown Manhattan below 60th Street, becoming the first city in the United States to do so. All proceeds go to the Metropolitan Transportation Authority, which plans to invest in long-term transportation initiatives citywide.

=== February ===
- February 20 – Six prison guards are charged with the murder of Robert Brooks, who was beaten to death at the Marcy Correctional Facility in Marcy.

=== March ===
- March 1 – Inmate Messiah Nantwi is beaten to death by correctional officers at the Mid-State Correctional Facility in Marcy. Ten correctional officers are charged in connection to Nantwi's death; six are charged for the assault, and four are charged with attempting to cover up the beating.
- March 8 – Columbia University student Mahmoud Khalil is detained by Immigration and Customs Enforcement agents and sent to a detention center in Jena, Louisiana. Khalil was involved in protests at Columbia the previous year. Agents tell Khalil his lawful permanent resident status is being revoked.
- March 22 – New York University wins the 2025 NCAA Division III women's basketball tournament, beating Smith College 77–49 to win their second straight title. With the win, NYU finishes with a perfect 31–0 record in the season.

=== April ===
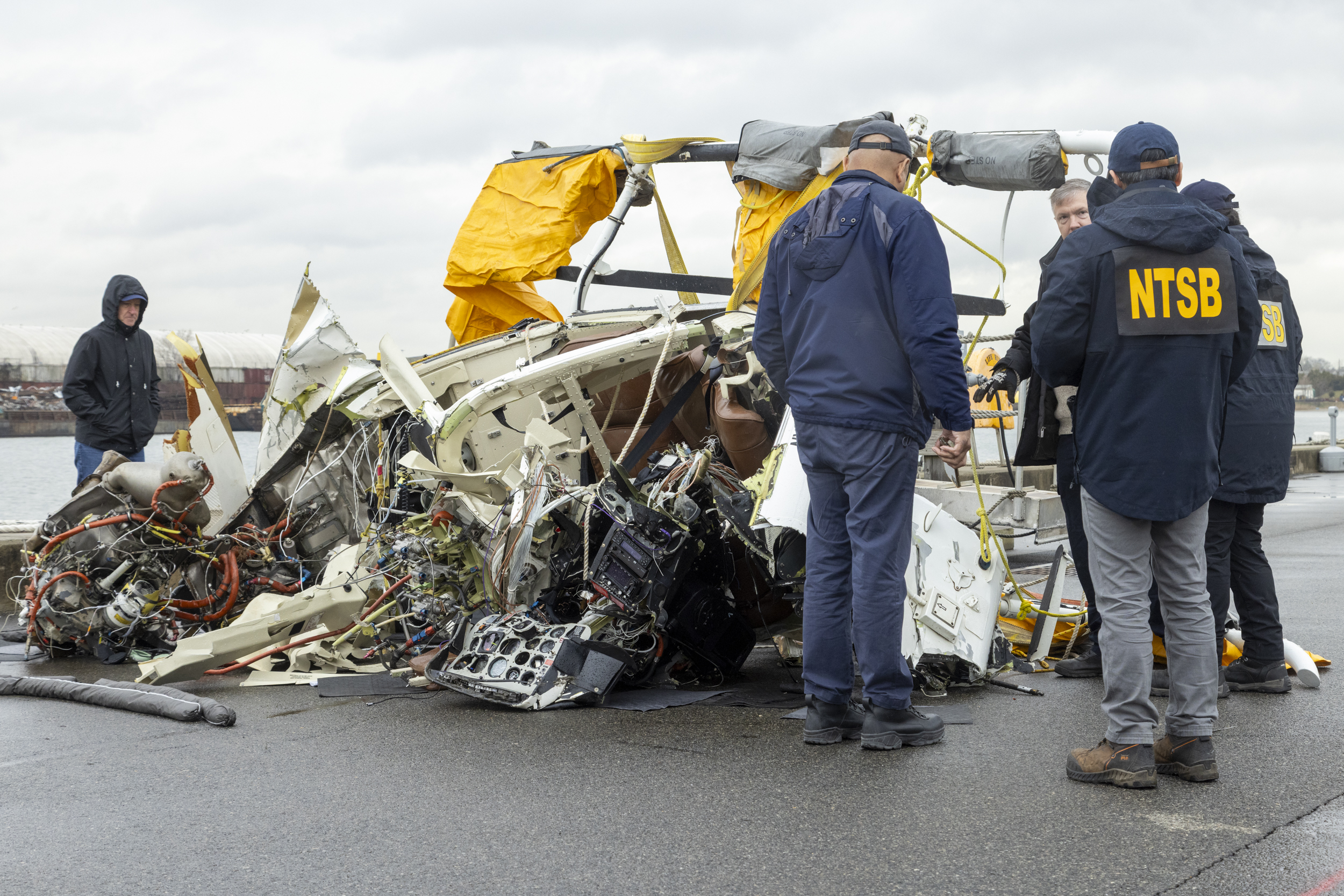
April 11: Investigators survey the wreckage of a sightseeing helicopter that crashed the day prior.

- April 10 – A sightseeing helicopter crashes into the Hudson River, killing all six people on board.
- April 24 – The Trump administration sues the city of Rochester over its sanctuary city policies.

=== May ===
- May 2 – Chester Highway Superintendent John Reilly III shoots at a lost DoorDash driver who was leaving his driveway. Reilly is later charged and convicted of assault.
- May 17 – Cuauhtémoc Brooklyn Bridge collision: The ARM Cuauhtémoc, a Mexican Navy vessel, hits the Brooklyn Bridge during a training exercise.
- May 24 – The Buffalo Bandits beat the Saskatchewan Rush 15–6 in game three of the 2025 National Lacrosse League finals, winning their third straight NLL season.
- May 26
  - Former House Representative Charles Rangel dies at age 94.
  - Cornell beats Maryland 13–10 to win the 2025 NCAA Division I men's lacrosse tournament, their fourth title and their first since 1977.

=== June ===
- June 7 – Sovereignty wins the 2025 Belmont Stakes.
- June 12 – The Trump administration sues the state of New York over a law barring immigration officials from arresting people in courthouses.
- June 20 – Mahmoud Khalil is released from the detention center in Louisiana after a federal judge orders his release.
- June 24 – 2025 New York City Democratic mayoral primary: State Assemblyman Zohran Mamdani wins the ranked-choice voting primary, beating former New York Governor Andrew Cuomo with 56% of the vote.

=== July ===
- July 2 – In a Manhattan federal court, Sean "Diddy" Combs is acquitted of racketeering and sex trafficking charges but found guilty of two lesser charges of transportation of women for prostitution.
- July 4 – Joey Chestnut wins the men's division of the Nathan's Hot Dog Eating Contest, reclaiming his title, after not participating the previous year due to a contract dispute. It is his 13th overall title. In the women's division, defending champion Miki Sudo wins her third straight title and 11th overall.
- July 7 – Barnard College settles a lawsuit accusing the school of not doing enough to combat antisemitism. As part of the settlement, Barnard bans campus protesters from wearing masks and says they will refuse to meet with pro-Palestinian groups.
- July 16 – Maurene Comey, a Manhattan prosecutor who worked on criminal cases against Jeffrey Epstein and Ghislaine Maxwell, is dismissed.
- July 24 – Trump sues New York City over its sanctuary city policies.

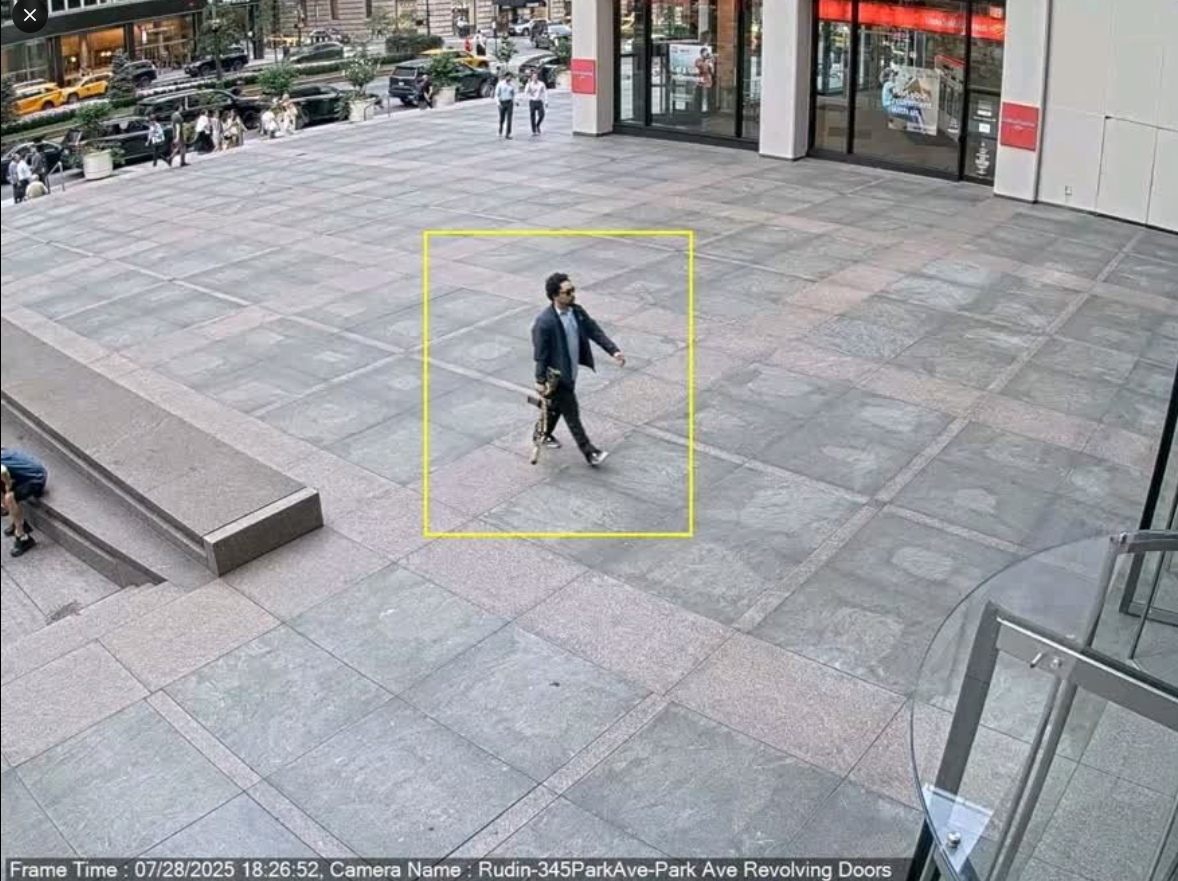
July 28: A gunman shoots five people at 345 Park Avenue in Manhattan.

- July 28:
  - Eight rabbis are arrested during a pro-humanitarian aid protest outside the Israeli consulate in Manhattan.
  - A gunman shoots five people, four fatally, at 345 Park Avenue in Midtown Manhattan before killing himself. An NYPD officer is among the dead.

=== August ===
- August 1:
  - Five protesters are arrested after chaining themselves to the United Nations' Permanent Mission of Egypt. The protest was organized in response to the closure of the Rafah Border Crossing connecting Egypt to Gaza.
  - Dozens of pro-Palestinian protesters are arrested at the New York offices of Senators Chuck Schumer and Kirsten Gillibrand. City Councilwoman Tiffany Cabán and State Assemblywoman Claire Valdez are among those arrested.
- August 4 – More than 40 pro-Palestinian protesters with IfNotNow are arrested outside the Trump International Hotel in Manhattan.
- August 9 – Three people are injured in a shooting during a dispute outside a Raising Cane's restaurant in Times Square. A 17-year-old is arrested.
- August 17 – Three people are killed and eight injured in a shooting at a club in Crown Heights, Brooklyn. Two of the four suspected gunmen are among the dead.
- August 21 – Ingrid Lewis-Martin, a former adviser to New York City Mayor Eric Adams, is indicted on bribery charges and is accused of taking more than $75,000 in bribes.
- August 22 – A tour bus driving to New York City from Niagara Falls crashes in Pembroke, killing five people.
- August 24–September 7 – US Open

=== September ===
- September 4 – 57 people, mainly Guatemalan nationals, are detained in an ICE raid on a snack bar plant in Cato.
- September 14 – The New York Atlas beats the Denver Outlaws 14–13 to win the 2025 Premier Lacrosse League season.
- September 15 – Trump sues The New York Times and four reporters over the paper's coverage of his 2024 presidential campaign.
- September 16 – A New York state judge dismisses state terrorism charges against Luigi Mangione, who is charged with killing the CEO of UnitedHealthcare in December 2024. Mangione still faces second-degree murder charges, as well as federal charges.
- September 18
  - DHS agents arrest 75 people during a protest in 26 Federal Plaza, including 11 state and New York City officials. The arrested officials are NYC Comptroller Brad Lander, State Senators Jabari Brisport, Gustavo Rivera and Julia Salazar, and Assemblymembers Robert Carroll, Emily Gallagher, Jessica González-Rojas, Marcela Mitaynes, Steven Raga, Tony Simone, and Claire Valdez. Another group of elected officials are arrested outside, including Public Advocate Jumaane Williams, City Council Members Tiffany Cabán and Sandy Nurse, and Assemblymember Phara Souffrant Forrest.
  - New York City, New York state, and nine other Northeastern states announce the formation of the Northeast Public Health Collaborative, a coalition of local health leaders.
- September 23 – Trump delivers a speech at the United Nations General Assembly in Manhattan.
- September 26–28 – 2025 Ryder Cup in Farmingdale
- September 28 – Eric Adams announces he is dropping out of the New York City mayoral race.

=== October ===
- October 1 – An explosion at a Bronx apartment building causes the chimney to collapse. Aside from the chimney there is no major damage to the building, and no injuries or deaths are reported.
- October 9 – New York Attorney General Letitia James is indicted on mortgage fraud charges in federal court in Virginia.

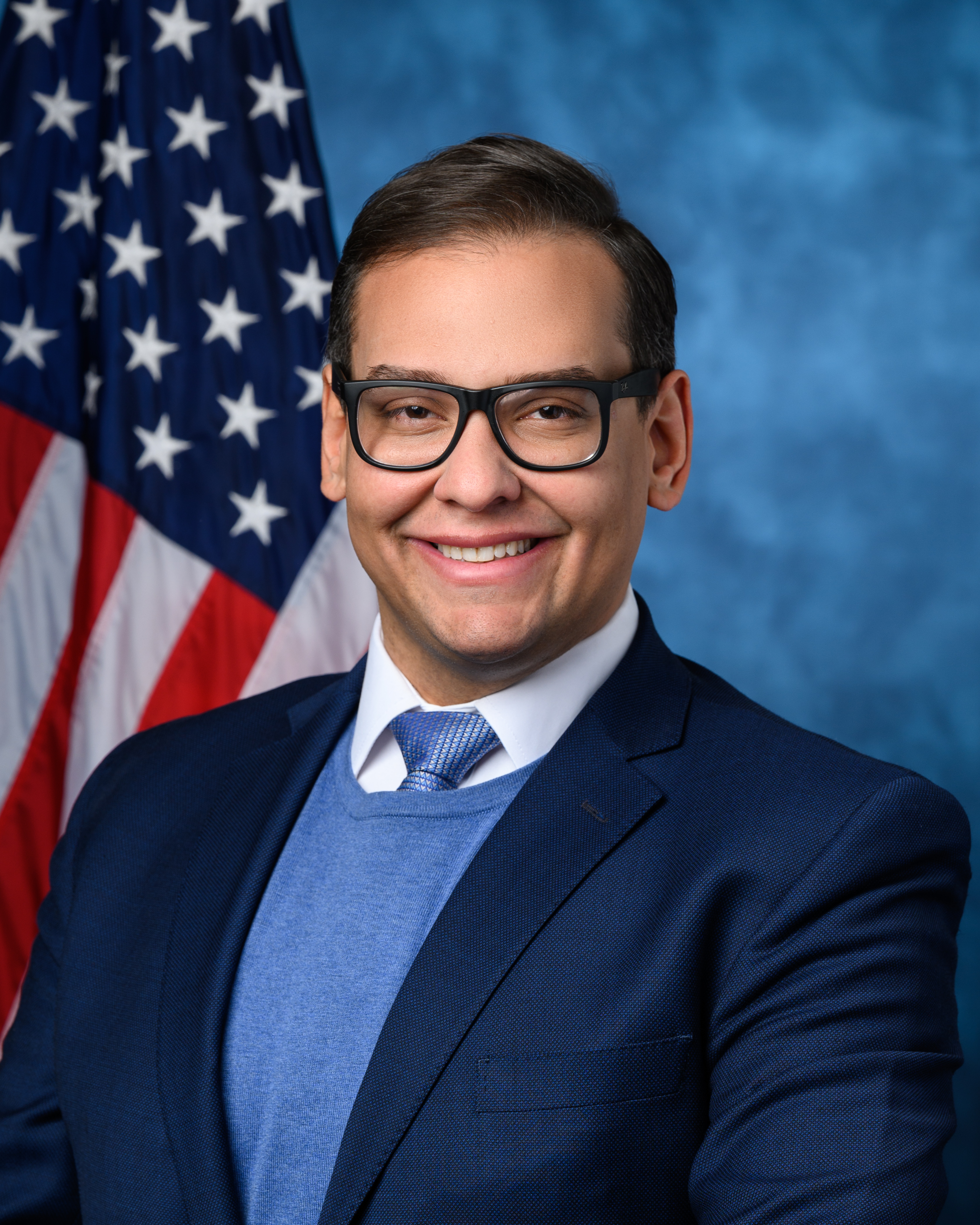
October 17: George Santos (pictured) is pardoned by President Trump.

- October 17
  - President Trump commutes the sentence of former U.S. House Representative George Santos, who was sentenced to seven years in prison in April for wire fraud and identity theft.
  - The New York Republican State Committee votes to disband the New York State Young Republicans chapter following a report by Politico that several of its members were in a group chat containing racist, homophobic, and antisemitic content.
- October 30 – Two people die in flooding following heavy rainstorms in New York City.

=== November ===
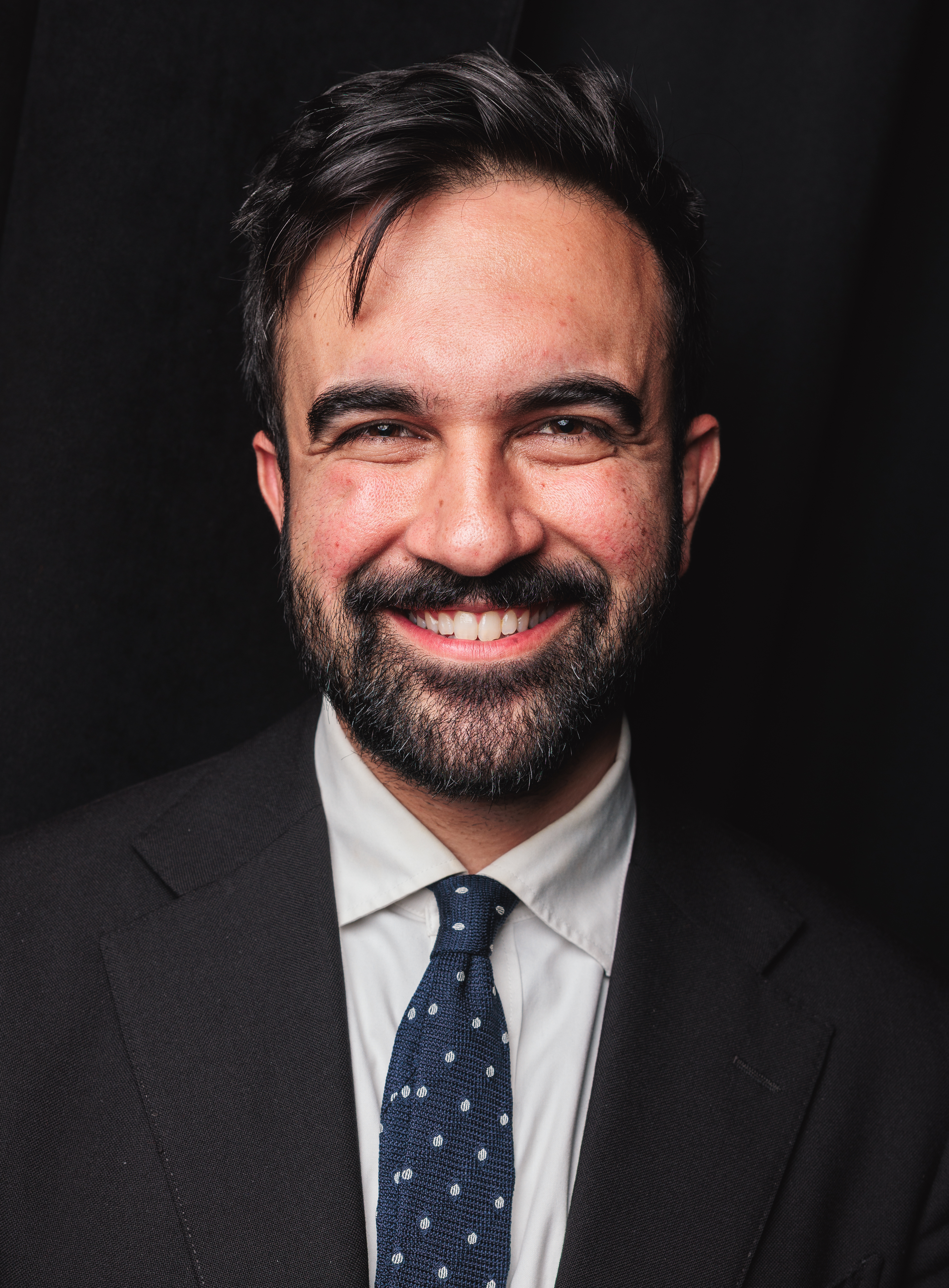
November 4: Zohran Mamdani (pictured) is elected mayor of New York City.

- November 4
  - 2025 Buffalo mayoral election: State Senator Sean Ryan is elected mayor of Buffalo, beating Republican James Gardner.
  - 2025 New York City mayoral election: State Assemblyman Zohran Mamdani is elected mayor of New York City, beating former Governor Andrew Cuomo and Guardian Angels founder Curtis Sliwa.
  - 2025 Syracuse mayoral election: Deputy Mayor Sharon Owens wins election to be mayor of Syracuse.
- November 8 – New York Red Bulls II wins the 2025 MLS Next Pro Cup, defeating Colorado Rapids 2 3–1 on penalties.
- November 22 – Gotham FC beats Washington Spirit 1–0 to win the 2025 NWSL Championship. It is their second championship in three seasons.
- November 24 – The charges against Letitia James are dismissed.
- November 25–December 7 – New York City goes 12 days without a homicide, tying the record for longest stretch without any homicides in the city.

=== December ===
- December 18 – Pope Leo XIV appoints Ronald Hicks to be the new archbishop of New York, replacing the retiring Cardinal Timothy Dolan.

== Deaths ==
- January 27 – Elisa Rae Shupe (born 1963), soldier and writer; first person in the U.S. to have a nonbinary gender marker on her driver's license

== See also ==
- 2025 in the United States
