= Killing of Javits Frimpong =

2026 killing in Bronx, New York, US

- Date: October 29, 2026
- Time: c. 9:24 a.m. (EDT)
- Location: The Bronx, New York City, US
- Type: Homicide by shooting
- Deaths: 1 (Javits Frimpong)

On October 29, 2026, Javits Badu Nkansah Frimpong, a 15-year-old immigrant from Ghana, was shot and killed in the Claremont neighborhood of The Bronx, New York City, United States. Frimpong was shot in the abdomen on his way to school near East 171st Street and Crotona Place. At around 9:24 a.m. officers found him with a gunshot wound, and he was transported to a local hospital where he was pronounced dead.

== Background ==
Frimpong moved from Ghana to New York City in 2025 to live with his father, Thomas Frimpong. According to his father, the relocation was intended to provide him with better opportunities. Thomas described his son as a quiet student who aspired to become a physician.

Frimpong's father said that school administrators had informed him that two students had been suspended following incidents of bullying involving his son. A school bus attendant also told CBS News that he was aware of the reported suspensions. Investigators had not confirmed whether the alleged bullying was connected to the shooting.

== Shooting ==
On the morning of 29 October 2026, Frimpong was shot near East 171st Street and Crotona Place while walking to school. Surveillance footage showed a teenager running through the neighborhood while being pursued by another individual dressed in black. Frimpong ran a short distance before collapsing.

Police officers responding to reports of a shooting found Frimpong suffering from a gunshot wound to the abdomen. He was transported to St. Barnabas Hospital, where he died from his injuries.

== Manhunt ==
Police launched a search for three boys suspected to be between 16 and 18. They were reportedly to have fled from the area in black tracksuits and blue surgical masks.

== Reactions ==
New York City mayor Zohran Mamdani, New York Attorney General Letitia James and U.S. Representative Adriano Espaillat expressed condolences following Frimpong's death.

The Government of Ghana condemned the killing and called for a thorough investigation. Ghana's minister for foreign affairs, Samuel Okudzeto Ablakwa, contacted Frimpong's father, Thomas Frimpong, to convey condolences on behalf of President John Mahama and assure the family of the government's support. Officials from Ghana's Permanent Mission in New York also visited the family, while the Ministry of Foreign Affairs pledged to cooperate with United States authorities and provide appropriate legal and consular assistance to the family.

On October 30, family members, religious leaders and residents gathered near the scene of the shooting in the Bronx for a vigil in Frimpong's memory. Participants offered prayers and called for an end to youth violence. Among those attending was Leandra Feliz, whose 15-year-old son, Lesandro Guzman-Feliz, had been killed in the Bronx in 2018. The New York City Department of Education also expressed condolences and announced that counseling and other support services would be made available to affected students, families and staff.

Several public figures responded to the killing. Ghanaian rapper Sarkodie expressed concern about the incident and violence affecting young people. American rapper A Boogie wit da Hoodie paid tribute to Frimpong during a concert at UBS Arena on October 30, while Cardi B condemned the killing and discussed bullying experienced by immigrant students in New York City schools.

On October 31, Mamdani announced that US president Donald Trump had agreed to grant a emergency visa to Frimpong's mother, Doris Adu Gyamfi, who remained in Ghana, following a telephone conversation between the two leaders. According to Mamdani, the agreement would allow her to travel to the United States to mourn her son in person. At the time of the announcement, the White House had not independently confirmed that the visa would be issued. The mother of a 15-year-old Ghanaian boy who was fatally shot in the United States last week has left Ghana for America after being granted an emergency visa by President Donald Trump.
