= 2021–2022 Columbia University strike =

Labor strike at Columbia University, New York City

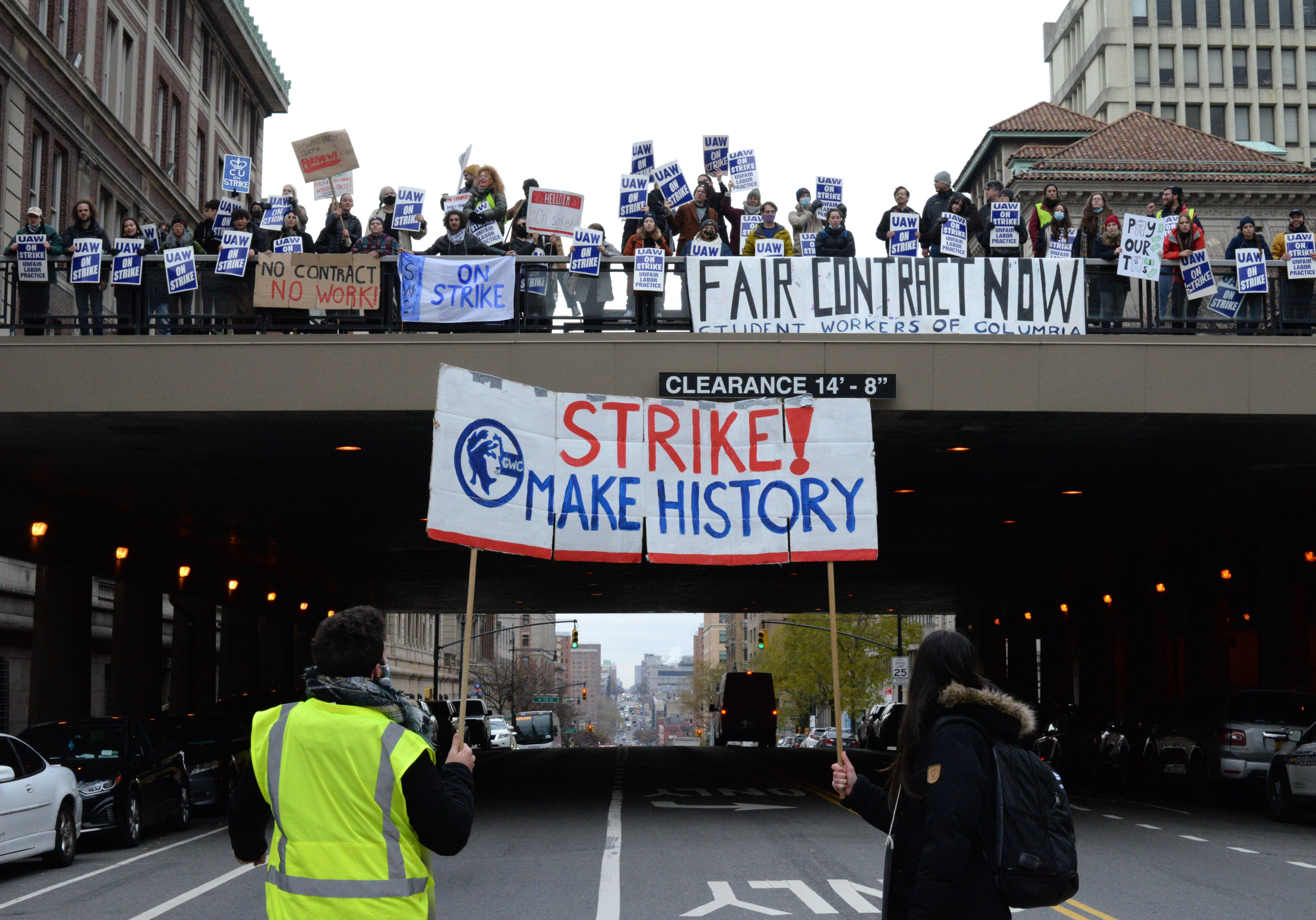
- Strikers and supporters protesting along Amsterdam Avenue and Revson Plaza on December 8, 2021
- Date: March 15 – May 13, 2021 (1 month and 4 weeks); November 3, 2021 – January 7, 2022 (2 months and 4 days)
- Location: New York City, New York, United States
- Goals: Ratification of a labor contract; Increased wages; Increased healthcare and childcare coverage; third-party arbitration in cases of discrimination and sexual harassment
- Methods: Strike action; Work stoppage; Picketing
- Result: Contract ratified between university and union that addressed many of the union's demands

Parties
| Graduate Workers of Columbia–United Auto Workers Local 2110 (later renamed Student Workers of Columbia) | Columbia University |

The 2021–2022 Columbia University strike was a labor strike involving graduate student workers at Columbia University in New York City. The strike began on March 15, 2021, and ended on May 13, 2021. However, additional strike action commenced on November 3 and lasted until January 7, 2022, when a tentative agreement with the university was reached. The strike was organized by the Graduate Workers of Columbia–United Auto Workers Local 2110 (SWC–UAW), a labor union representing student workers at the university. The goals of the strike were an increase in wages, increased healthcare and childcare coverage, and third-party arbitration in cases of discrimination and sexual harassment.

While the union voted in March 2020 to authorize strike action, these plans were postponed due to the COVID-19 pandemic. However, in February 2021, still without a labor contract, the union announced their intent to strike the following month. The strike began on March 15 as an open-ended strike action, with no set end date. The strike coincided with a tuition strike that had been coordinated by the local chapter of the Young Democratic Socialists of America. Picketing and other forms of protest were held at numerous Columbia locations throughout New York City, and multiple elected officials and politicians announced their support for the strikers. On April 19, a contract proposal was submitted for ratification by the union members, but it was rejected in a rank-and-file vote. Following this, a vote was held in early May to determine the future of the strike, with a majority of voters choosing to end the strike, which officially ended on May 13.

Following the end of the strike, on July 3, new leaders for the union were elected who promised to continue to push for a labor contract with the university. Additionally, the name of the union was changed to the Student Workers of Columbia. While negotiations were set to resume on August 25, disagreements between the two groups led to a deadlock in negotiations, and in late September, the union voted to authorize another strike action. This renewed strike action began on November 3 and continued through late 2021 and into early 2022. The union and the university entered mediation on November 22, 2021, after both parties agreed to hire independent labor mediator Kevin Flanigan. The strike continued until January 7, 2022, when the union voted to stop striking after approving a tentative agreement between the university and union that included several concessions to the union, such as increased healthcare and childcare coverage, increased pay, and changes to the arbitration process at Columbia. By a vote of 2,099 to 51, the union approved the contract on January 28.

== Background ==
=== Unionization at Columbia ===
In a 2018 article, The New York Times stated that "[t]he question of whether graduate students at private universities can unionize has seesawed for years, depending, in part, on the political leanings of the members of the National Labor Relations Board (NLRB)." In 2000, the board ruled in favor of allowing graduate students at New York University (NYU) to unionize, leading to a surge in similar unionization at several American universities. However, in a 2004 ruling regarding a labor union at Brown University, the board reversed its decision and ruled that teaching assistants are not covered under federal labor law. In 2016, the board would again reverse its decision in a case involving a unionization effort at Columbia University in New York City. In December of that year, following the ruling, graduate students at the university voted 1,602 to 623 to unionize with the United Auto Workers (UAW), with approximately 3,500 graduate students as part of this new union, called the Graduate Workers of Columbia–United Auto Workers (GWC–UAW) Local 2110. Shortly afterwards, the university appealed to the board, which found that the vote had been fair and that the union should be recognized. In January 2018, the university stated they would not bargain with the union, prompting legal proceedings in a federal appeals court. In April, the union performed a one-week strike over the university's refusal to recognize them. By 2019, Columbia had agreed to recognize the union.

=== Contract negotiations ===
Starting in 2019, the union and university began to negotiate over their first labor contract, with the union's bargaining unit meeting with university officials for the first time on February 26 of that year. However, after over a year, no agreement had been reached between the two parties. The main point of contention between the two groups was on the issue of union recognition, as the university recognized only doctoral students who were fully funded as union members, while the union also recognized students pursuing a master's degree and undergraduate students working as teaching assistants as well. In addition to expanded recognition, the union was also seeking expanded health benefits and increased subsidies for child care. In light of the COVID-19 pandemic, the union was also pushing for a one-year funding extension for doctoral candidates whose research had been interrupted by pandemic shutdowns. In March 2020, the union voted 1,833 to 77 in favor of strike action against the university. However, due to the pandemic, plans for the strike were postponed, and the university and union continued to negotiate.

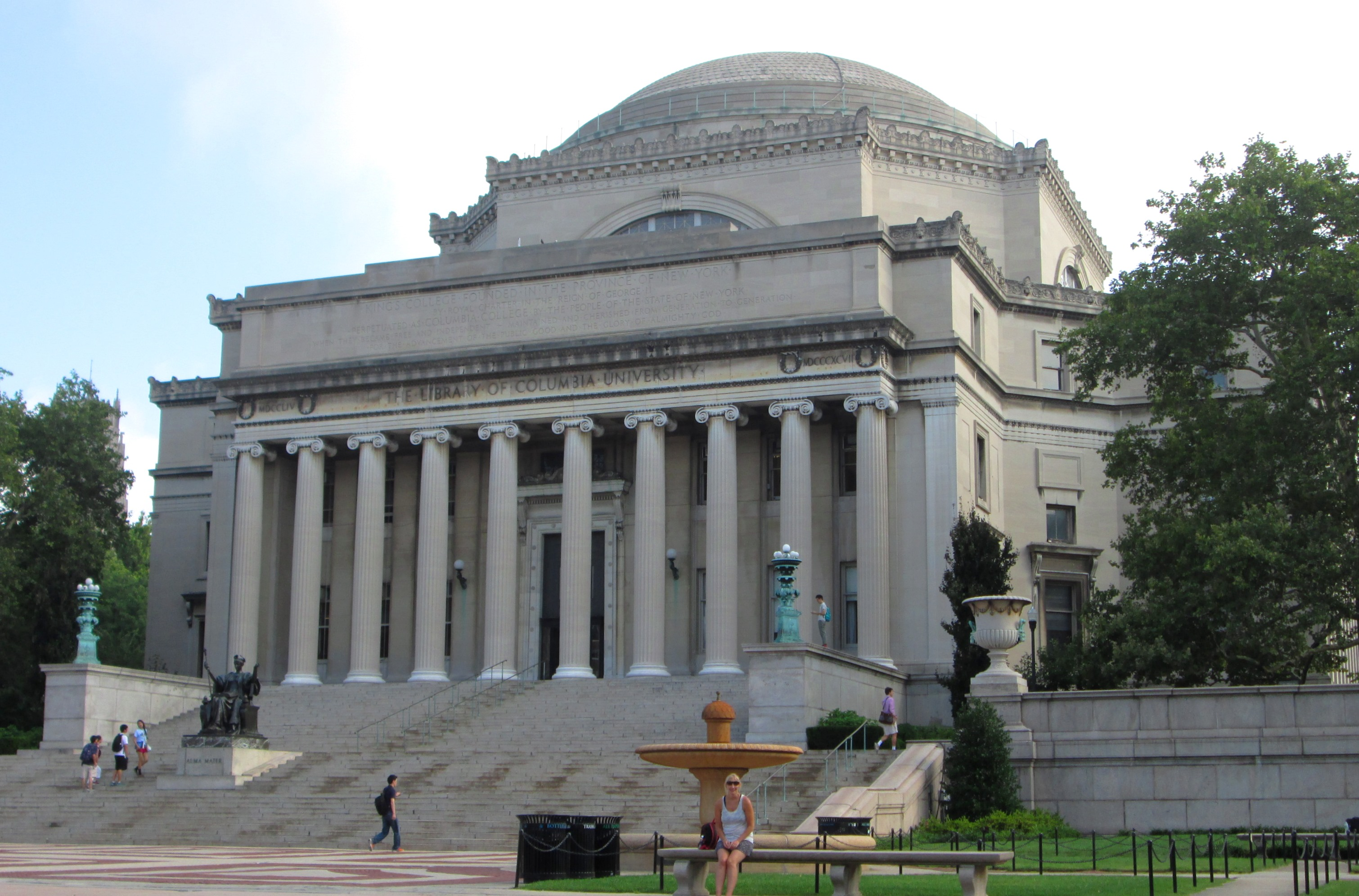
On February 25, union members gathered on the steps of the Low Memorial Library to announce their intent to strike.

Starting in January 2021, a large group of primarily undergraduate students at Columbia began an unrelated tuition strike, seeking both a decrease in the cost of tuition and an increase in student financial aid during the pandemic. The strike was in large part organized by the local chapter of the Young Democratic Socialists of America (YDSA), who also supported the GWC–UAW and was working with them in their contract negotiations, with full recognition of the union being an additional demand of the tuition strike. During the strike, a deadline of February 25 was instated, after which point, if no agreement between the union and university had been made, the union would prepare for strike action. On February 25, with no agreement in place after 64 bargaining sessions, union members gathered on the steps of the Low Memorial Library and announced their intent to begin striking on March 15. At the time of the announcement, an article in the Columbia Daily Spectator stated that "[a]bout 10 demands" were still being discussed, with full union recognition being chief among them. U.S. Representative Alexandria Ocasio-Cortez showed her support for the union by sending coffee and doughnuts to the GWC–UAW members, while additional support was voiced by New York City Council member Mark Levine. On March 8, interim provost Ira Katznelson sent an open letter addressing the strike notice, claiming that, while both sides were working towards an agreement, the union's demands for wage increases were "neither reasonable nor responsible in present circumstances". An article in The Chronicle of Higher Education criticized Katznelson's approach to the situation, calling his stance hypocritical based on his previous involvement with the labor movement and even calling him a "labor sympathizer". A March 11 article in the Spectator reported that the union and university were still holding bargaining sessions in an attempt to avoid the strike action, though the 10 points of contention were still unaddressed at that point. The last day of official bargaining discussions between the two groups was on March 12.

== Initial strike ==
On March 15, with no agreement between the university and union, the strike officially began, affecting an approximate 3,000 members of the GWC–UAW. A GoFundMe page was set up to serve as a strike fund, which raised US$57,000 that first day. Picketing commenced at several locations around the university, including at College Walk and at the intersection of Broadway and 116th Street. Starting on March 17, additional picketing took place at the Columbia University Irving Medical Center in Washington Heights, with additional picketing scheduled over the next several days at the Jerome L. Greene Science Center. On March 18, picketing expanded to the part of the university in Manhattanville. Over the course of the first week of the strike, multiple elected officials and candidates voiced their support for the strike, including 2021 New York City mayoral candidates Maya Wiley and Scott Stringer (who is also the current New York City Comptroller), New York City Council member Brad Lander, and Manhattan District Attorney candidate Eliza Orlins, among others. Additionally, the Spectator reported that numerous undergraduate students were in support of the strike, including the president of the Class of 2024. On March 18, union and university representatives met over Zoom for a bargaining session, during which the Spectator reported, "tensions were higher than usual". By the end of the first week of the strike, the Spectator reported that both sides were considering outside mediation to help in the negotiations. The next meeting between the two groups at this time was scheduled for March 23. On March 19, the graduate union for NYU announced that they would be holding a vote to authorize strike action against their respective university, with the GWC–UAW announcing their support.

On March 24, news website Bwog reported that, following the March 23 meeting between the union and university, the two parties were primarily focused on discussing issues regarding arbitration for claims made by union members of harassment and discrimination, with the union pushing for third-party arbitration in those cases. On March 31, the Columbia Law School chapter of the Law School Democrats of America canceled an event with former U.S. Representative Ben McAdams in a show of solidarity with the strikers. On April 1, the graduate student union at North Carolina State University published an op-ed in the Technician wherein they voiced their support for the Columbia union. On April 2, U.S. Representative Jamaal Bowman and New York City Council member Carlina Rivera attended pickets and voiced their support, with Bowman comparing the efforts of the GWC–UAW members to the Bessemer union drive, saying "Capitalism is destroying our humanity, [but] we are going to win". Later that day, the bargaining unit for the GWC–UAW voted 7–3 to accept an offer by the university to have outside mediation in exchange for a pause on strike action. According to polling of GWC–UAW members, only a small fraction approved of the bargaining unit's decision, with one member of the unit who had voted against the offer claiming in an article published by the Spectator that "It was very clear to me that many other members of the bargaining committee were unwilling to continue striking, no matter what". As the decision was made on a Friday, GWC–UAW members returned to work the following Monday, April 5. That same day, following a vote organized by the local YDSA chapter, students at Columbia ended their tuition strike. Despite the bargaining unit's decision, GWC–UAW members in the university's religion department stated they would continue to strike until the union's demands are met.

On April 19, the bargaining committee submitted a proposed contract for a vote by rank-and-file members. The committee had voted 7–3 to accept the contract, which included agreements for increased pay and other benefits, but lacked agreements for neutral third-party arbitration in cases regarding harassment and discrimination. Voting took place between April 21 and April 30. The contract failed approval as union members voted 1,093–970 to continue negotiations. Approximately 63% of all GWC–UAW members voted. Union members were opposed to certain agreements that were absent in the contract, such as third-party arbitration, a living wage, complete recognition of the bargaining unit, and full dental coverage. According to the Spectator, the vote marked the first time in history a graduate student union has voted to reject a tentative agreement. Following this, on May 4, the union announced that they would be holding a vote among their members between May 5 and May 12 on whether or not to continue the strike. On May 6, the seven bargaining unit members who voted to accept the contract resigned from the unit, alleging "toxic internal politics that have long been present in our union". This came after a petition had circulated among union members calling for new bargaining unit members, with the resigning members stating they were stepping down in order to "restore [the] democratic mandate" of the unit. At the time of their resignation, the petition had over 500 signatures. The remaining three members resigned on May 13. That day, following a vote of 771 to end and 323 to continue, the strike officially ended.

== Interim ==
On July 3, union elections were held that saw the election of a new ten-person bargaining committee, composed of eight newly elected individuals and two who had previously served during the strike. This new bargaining committee promised to promote a "more democratic" union as they planned to continue to push for a labor contract during the upcoming fall semester. Additionally, during the elections, the name of the union was changed to the Student Workers of Columbia (SWC). In early August, the Spectator reported on a change to the stipend pay schedule for graduate students where, instead of receiving a large lump sum at the beginning of their semesters, they would instead receive their stipends on a semi-monthly basis. SWC contended that this change may have been a response to the strike, arguing that stipend pay that is paid out semi-monthly as opposed to in an upfront lump sum could be easier to use as leverage in the event of a graduate student strike. The first round of renewed bargaining sessions between the union and university were scheduled to begin on August 25. However, this meeting did not occur due to a disagreement between the university and union. According to union bylaws ratified over the summer, all bargaining sessions were to be open to all union members, while the university was willing to meet only in a closed-door meeting with the bargaining committee and a maximum of five other members.

On September 15, in part due to the ongoing standstill in negotiations, SWC authorized a vote for strike authorization, which would allow the bargaining committee to call a strike at any time. Voting on this ended on September 27. Additionally, SWC filed an unfair labor practice charge with the NLRB over Columbia's changed disbursement policies, calling them "illegal retaliatory practices". SWC's strike authorization vote is occurring at the same time as one amongst student workers at Harvard University, another Ivy League university. On September 30, the union revealed that the strike authorization vote had passed in a vote of 1,804–234. Around the same time, the bargaining committee announced additional demands for the university for increased childcare coverage, no-questions-asked funding for adviser transfers, and a banning of New York City Police Department (NYPD) and Immigration Customs and Enforcement (ICE) presence from Columbia's campus. The last demand regarding NYPD and ICE was modeled after a similar agreement that NYU had recently reached with their graduate students' union.

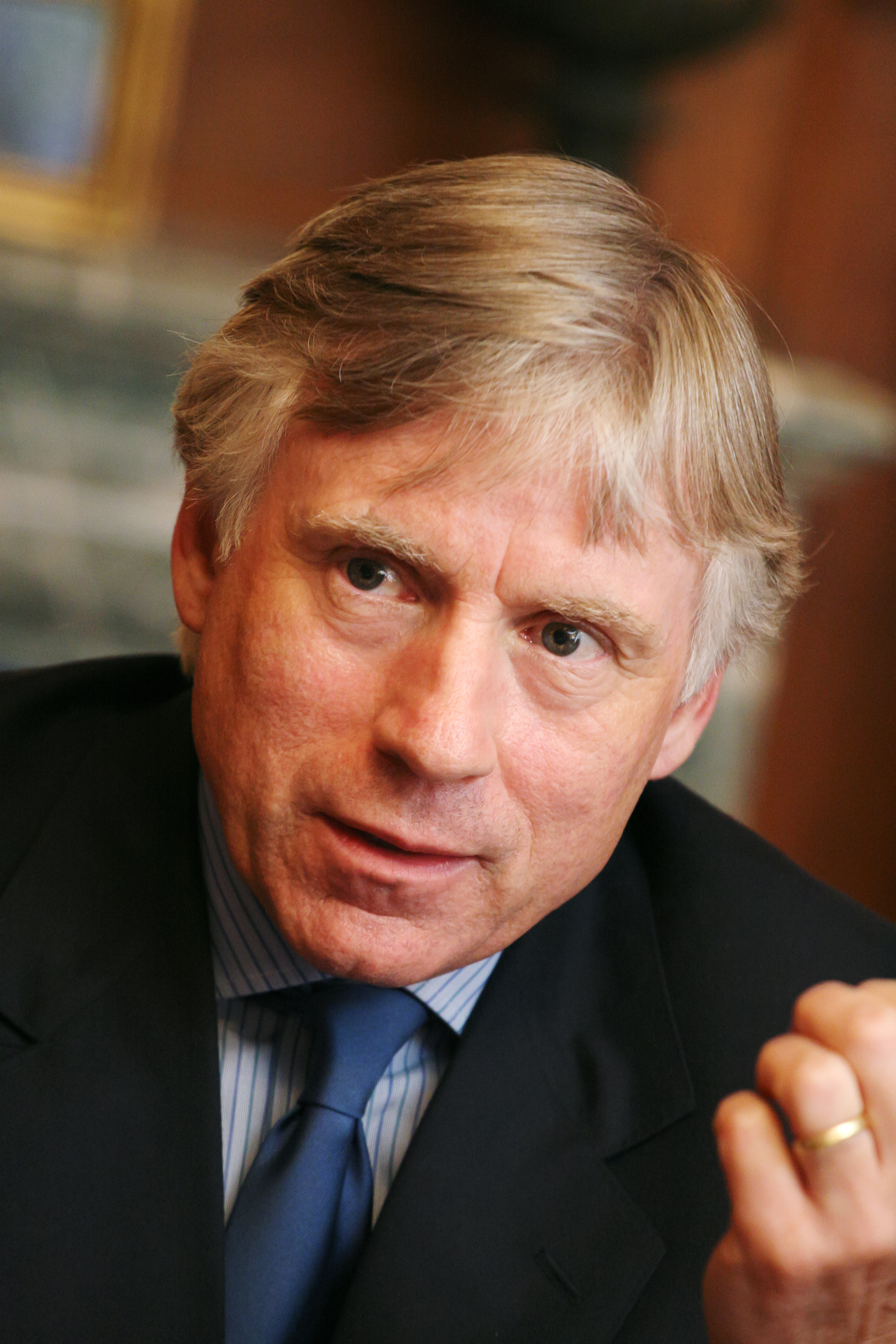
Lee Bollinger, president of Columbia University during the strike

On October 20, the SWC announced that, barring constructive negotiations between the union and university administration, a new strike action would begin on November 3. One week later, on October 27, union members held a walkout and rally, with some graduate student instructors interrupting their classes and bringing their undergraduate students to the rally at the steps of the Low Memorial Library. After several speeches from the steps, some of the protestors marched to Schermerhorn Hall to interrupt a class being held by Columbia University President Lee Bollinger, with chants of "fuck you, PrezBo" and "no contract, no work". Additional protesting took place outside of President Bollinger's house, which lasted about 20 minutes.

== Later strike ==
On November 3, the SWC began another open-ended strike action against the university. This second strike action roughly coincided with the wave of other large-scale strike actions in the United States known as "Striketober", which included the 2021 John Deere strike and the 2021 Kellogg's strike. The strike was the second biggest labor dispute in the United States by number of strikers involved, behind the John Deere strike. On November 10, Columbia University Provost Mary Cunningham Boyce stated that the university was willing to engage in negotiations to resolve the labor dispute and reiterated her support for mediation, though the union rejected the offer, stating that they believed it was too early in the strike to call on mediatory services. This decision was due in part to the use of mediation in the previous strike action, in which the union members voted down the proposal that had been drafted with mediatory help. On November 22, the union agreed to enter into mediation with the university administration. However, in a change from the previous mediation, the mediation discussions would be available for all union members, and additionally, the strike would continue throughout the mediation process. The decision to continue striking was approved by about 90 percent of the union members. As such, going into December, the union continued to hold several large-scale rallies and marches. Kevin Flanigan, an arbitrator from the New York State Public Employment Relations Board, was selected to serve as the mediator between the union and university.

On December 1, Columbia's Human Resources office sent a notice to all student workers that a failure to return to work by December 10 would mean “the possibility” of not receiving appointments for the spring. This was an illegal threat in violation of the National Labor Relations Act, which states that in an Unfair Labor Practice strike, "strikers can be neither discharged nor permanently replaced." In response, SWC organized a hard picket at Columbia's Morningside campus on December 8. The campus was shut down with hard pickets sustained at all entrances to the campus during business hours.

On December 10, the university announced changes to the class credit policy to help undergraduate students who had been affected by the strike. By late December, the Spectator was calling the graduate students' strike "the largest strike in the nation".

On December 22, the university submitted to the union its "best and final offer" regarding a contract. In a letter to the editor published the next day in The Wall Street Journal, Provost Boyce stated that the proposal "is one of the most generous available at any U.S. university". However, due to disagreements with the union regarding certain terms of the proposal, such as a failure to recognize all union members as members of the bargaining unit, negotiations continued. On December 31, the union and university administration held another negotiation session wherein the union proposed below-inflation raise caps and an agreement not to perform another strike action for the next four years. Additionally, the union would give casual employees the opportunity to decide whether they wanted to join SWC or not. However, the university pushed further for an open shop model of employment at the university, which SWC rejected due to the perceived impact the agreement would have on the union's power.

On January 7, 2022, the SWC announced that a tentative agreement had been reached with the university, with 93.5 percent of the union members voting to end the strike at noon that day. The agreement included provisions for the union such as increased wages (including retroactive wage increases) of up to 30 percent, full union recognition from the university, and union member access to arbitration and mediation services in cases of discrimination or harassment claims. Additionally, the university would expand healthcare and childcare coverage by offering dental health insurance, increasing childcare stipends, and creating a $300,000 emergency health fund. In exchange, the union agreed to drop three unfair labor practice charges that they had filed against the university. The contract would last for four years, with negotiations for another contract scheduled for Spring 2025. Following the announcement of the agreement, the union organized several town halls and other information sessions to allow members to discuss the terms of the agreement. This discussion period was followed by a voting period lasting from January 22 to January 27. An announcement regarding whether the contract has been approved or not is scheduled for January 28. Speaking about the agreement, Provost Boyce stated that she was optimistic that the Spring 2022 semester (scheduled to start on January 18) would operate normally and without labor disruptions. On January 28, the union reported that the contract had been approved in a vote of 2,099 for and 51 against.

== See also ==
- COVID-19 pandemic in New York City
- Impact of the COVID-19 pandemic on education
- Strikes during the COVID-19 pandemic
