= Matthew Van Houten =

American lawyer

Tompkins County District Attorney
- Incumbent
- Assumed office January 1, 2017
- Preceded by: Gwen Wilkinson

Personal details
- Party: Democratic
- Education: United States Military Academy; Albany Law School

Matthew Van Houten is an American lawyer who has been serving as Tompkins County, New York District Attorney since 2017.

== Early life and education ==
Van Houten attended the United States Military Academy, and subsequently Albany Law School.

== Career ==
Van Houten was elected Tompkins County District Attorney in 2016, assuming office on January 1, 2017. He was subsequently re-elected in 2020 and 2024.

=== 2024 Cornell University rape allegations ===
In 2024, Van Houten decided not to bring charges against members of a Cornell University fraternity who allegedly sexually assaulted a woman, known as Jane Doe, but failed to directly communicate that decision to Jane Doe or her attorney. Van Houten said he was expecting the Cornell police to convey that a prosecution would not go forward, yet Jane Doe was left with the impression that an investigation was still ongoing.

In September 2026, following widespread media coverage of the case, Van Houten announced his office was re-opening the investigation.

On October 2, 2026, New York governor Kathy Hochul removed Van Houten from the case, and appointed New York attorney general Leticia James as a special prosecutor to oversee the case. In a statement, Hochul said Van Houten's decision not to bring charges and the Cornell University Police Department's handling of the case had "undercut my faith, and the public's faith, in the district attorney's ability to effectively investigate and prosecute the case at this time."
