= 2024 in New York =

- Decades
- See also: History of New York; 2024 in the United States

The following is a list of events of the year 2024 in New York.

== Incumbents ==
=== State government ===
- Governor: Kathy Hochul (D)
- Eric Adams, the Mayor of New York

== Events ==
=== January ===
- January 3 – A court in New York releases unsealed documents containing the associates list of Jeffrey Epstein to the public.
- January 4 – 2024 New York City Subway derailment
- January 26 – The U.S. Justice Department finds former New York Governor Andrew Cuomo liable for sexual harassment.

=== February ===
- February 13 – 2024 New York's 3rd congressional district special election: In the U.S., Democrat Tom Suozzi wins the special election in his former seat which was vacated following the expulsion of Republican George Santos.
- February 16 – New York civil investigation of The Trump Organization: Former U.S. president Donald Trump is fined over $350 million by the New York Supreme Court and temporarily barred from business in New York as a result of The Trump Organization's financial fraud.

=== March ===
- March 7 – New York State Governor Kathy Hochul deploys 750 national guard troops to the New York City subways to counter crime and a recent spike in violent assaults.
- March 8 – Former Honduran president Juan Orlando Hernández is found guilty of drug trafficking charges in a federal court in New York.

=== April ===
- April 19 – Self-immolation of Maxwell Azzarello: A man fatally sets himself on fire near the New York City courthouse where former president Donald Trump was on trial.
- April 20 – American college students plan demonstrations in solidarity with pro-Palestinian Columbia University protesters arrested in New York City.
- April 25 – The New York Court of Appeals overturns former American film producer Harvey Weinstein's 2020 conviction in the state for rape by a vote of 4–3, and orders a new trial. However, Weinstein will still remain in prison on a 2022 conviction in California for rape.

=== May ===
- May 2 – Police arrest 133 pro-Palestinian protesters at the State University of New York at New Paltz.
- May 3
  - Police arrest 70 pro-Palestinian protesters at the State University of New York at Purchase.
  - The NYPD arrests 59 protesters at New York University and The New School.
- May 6 – The 2024 Met Gala takes place at the Metropolitan Museum of Art in New York City with the theme "The Garden of Time", celebrating the Met's exhibit Sleeping Beauties: Reawakening Fashion.
- May 7 – Police arrest 50 people at an encampment on the Fashion Institute of Technology campus.
- May 10 – Academic staff of The New School in New York City hold the first faculty-led Pro-Palestinian solidarity encampment in the United States.
- May 15 – Federal prosecutors in New York City charge two brothers, Anton and James Peraire-Bueno, with conspiracy to commit wire fraud, and conspiracy to commit money laundering, after they were arrested for exploiting the Ethereum blockchain and stealing $25 million worth of cryptocurrency.
- May 30 – Former president of the United States Donald Trump is found guilty by a jury on all 34 felony counts relating to falsifying business records, becoming the first U.S. president to be convicted of a crime.
- May 31 – Pro-Palestinian protesters occupy parts of the Brooklyn Museum in New York City.

=== June ===
- June 26 – 2024 United States House of Representatives elections in New York:
  - Incumbent New York representative Jamaal Bowman loses a Democratic Party primary challenge against George Latimer in the 16th district, in what has become the most expensive House of Representatives primary in history by campaign spending.
- June 28 – Four people are killed and nine others are injured when a minivan crashes into a nail salon in Deer Park, Long Island.

=== July ===
- July 2 – Former New York City Mayor and lawyer Rudy Giuliani is disbarred in the State of New York for his efforts in attempting to overturn the 2020 election.
- July 4 – Three people are killed and seven others are injured when a pickup truck is driven into a crowd celebrating Independence Day on the Lower East Side of Manhattan in New York City.

=== September ===
- September 2 –
  - One person is fatally shot and at least four other people are injured including one person who was critically injured in a mass shooting at the West Indian Day Parade in Brooklyn.
  - Thousands of people gather in Manhattan, New York City, United States, to protest against the Israeli invasion of the Gaza Strip, rally for support of Palestinians, and call for New York institutions to divest from Israeli businesses.
- September 6 – New York Supreme Court justice Juan Merchan postpones former U.S. president Donald Trump's sentencing in his criminal case until after Election Day on November 5.
- September 25 – New York Mayor Eric Adams is indicted on federal charges following a corruption investigation, becoming the first mayor of New York City to face criminal charges while in office.

=== October ===
- October 14 – Over 200 pro-Palestinian demonstrators against American involvement in Israeli attacks on civilians in the Gaza Strip, many from Jewish Voice for Peace, are arrested outside of the New York Stock Exchange for attempting to block it.

=== November ===
- November 5 – 2024 United States presidential election in New York
- November 8 - A massive wildfire burns in the forests of New York and New Jersey. Fire fighters from both states joined forces to put out the fire.

=== December ===
- December 4 – UnitedHealthcare CEO Brian Thompson is assassinated outside a hotel in midtown Manhattan in what police believe is a targeted attack. The suspect is a 28 year old man who fled to another state. He was later extradited to New York.
- December 9 – Inmate Robert Brooks is beaten to death by correctional officers at Marcy Correctional Facility. Six correctional officers are charged and 17 employees face disciplinary action.

== See also ==
- 2024 in the United States
