= List of New York state prisons =

Locations of state prisons within New York

This is a list of state prisons in New York.

The New York State Department of Corrections and Community Supervision is the department of the New York State government that maintains the state prisons and parole system. There are 41 prisons administered by the State of New York, and approximately 28,200 parolees at seven regional offices as of 2022.

As of 2016 New York does not contract with private prisons, according to state law.

== Facilities ==
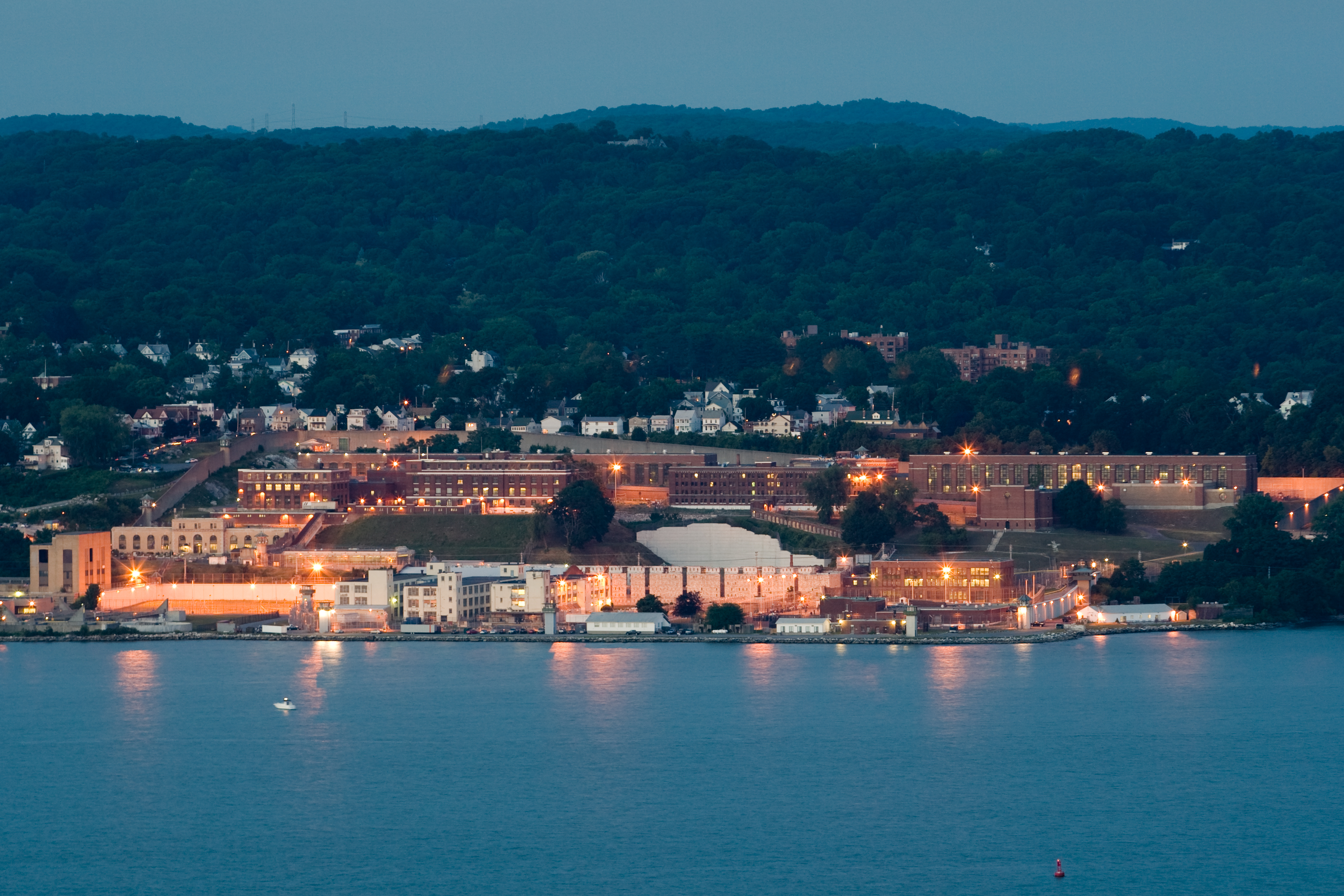
Sing Sing Correctional Facility

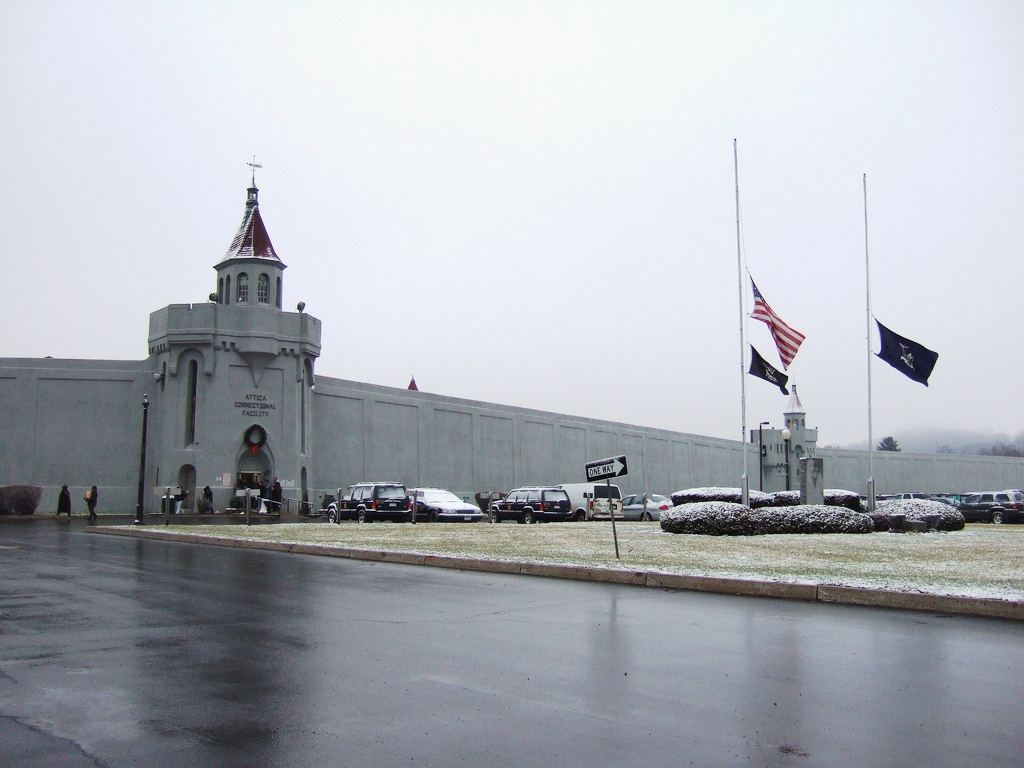
Attica Correctional Facility

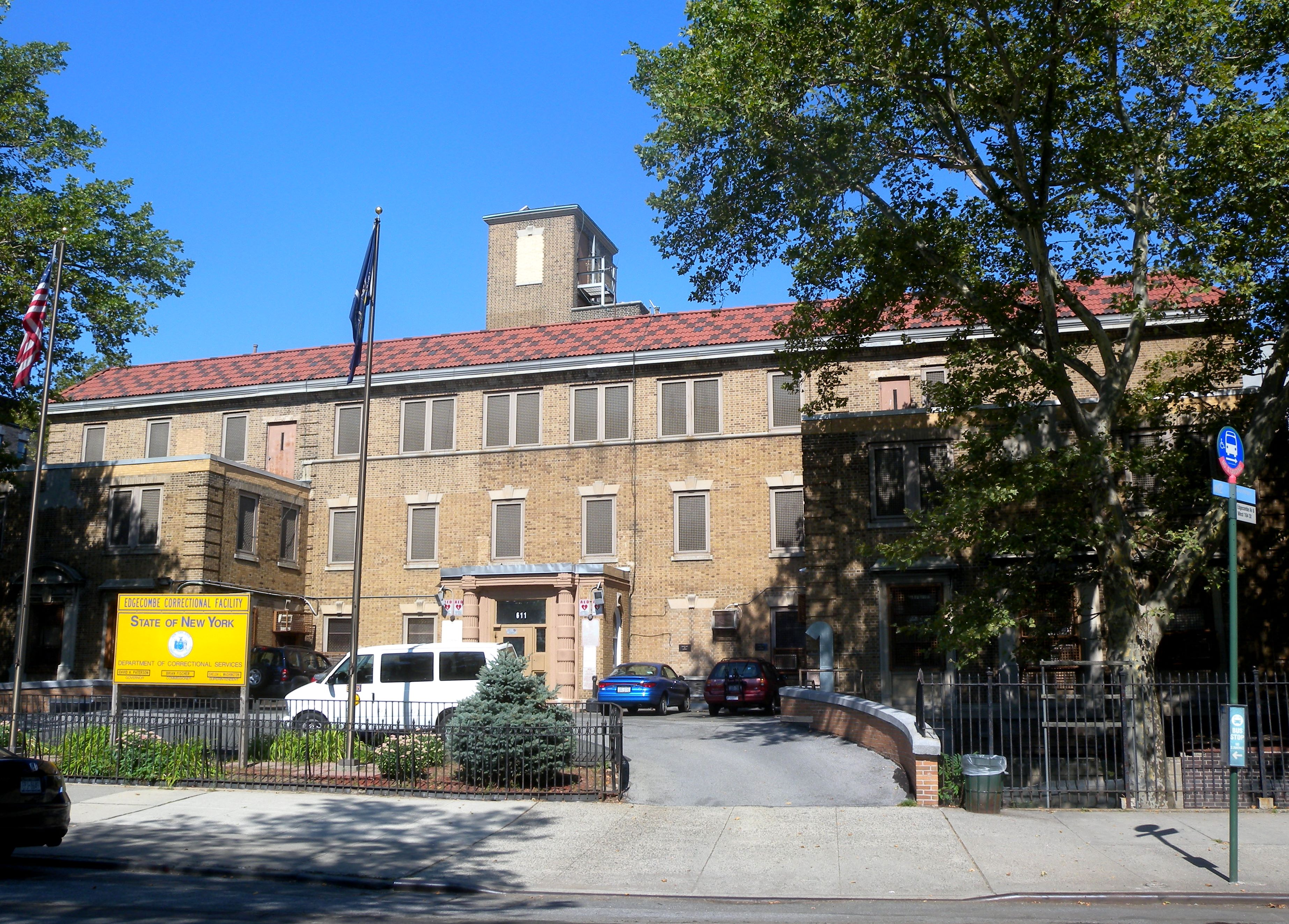
Edgecombe Correctional Facility

The following list does not include federal prisons, New York City jails, or county jails located in the state of New York.

Facility	County	Security Level	Opened	Capacity
Adirondack Correctional Facility	Essex	Medium	1904	566
Albion Correctional Facility	Orleans	Medium (female)	1894	1,274
Altona Correctional Facility	Clinton	Medium	1983	512
Attica Correctional Facility	Wyoming	Maximum	1931	2,253
Auburn Correctional Facility	Cayuga	Maximum	1818	1,821
Bedford Hills Correctional Facility	Westchester	Maximum (female)	1901	921
Cape Vincent Correctional Facility	Jefferson	Medium	1956	882
Cayuga Correctional Facility	Cayuga	Medium	1988	1,082
Clinton Correctional Facility	Clinton	Maximum	1845	2,959
Collins Correctional Facility	Erie	Medium	1982	1,700
Coxsackie Correctional Facility	Greene	Maximum	1935	900
Eastern Correctional Facility	Ulster	Maximum	1900	1,100
Edgecombe Residential Treatment Facility	New York	Minimum (co-ed)		200
Elmira Correctional Facility	Chemung	Maximum	1876	1,350
Fishkill Correctional Facility	Dutchess	Medium	1977	1,800
Five Points Correctional Facility	Seneca	Maximum	2000	1,550
Franklin Correctional Facility	Franklin	Medium	1986	1,730
Gouverneur Correctional Facility	St. Lawrence	Medium	1990	800
Green Haven Correctional Facility	Dutchess	Maximum	1949	2,170
Greene Correctional Facility	Greene	Medium	1984	1,813
Groveland Correctional Facility	Livingston	Medium	1982	1,106
Hale Creek Correctional Facility	Fulton	Medium	1990	480
Hudson Correctional Facility	Columbia	Medium		402
Lakeview Shock Incarceration Correctional Facility	Chautauqua	Minimum (co-ed)	1987	1,100
Marcy Correctional Facility	Oneida	Medium	1989	1,522
Mid-State Correctional Facility	Oneida	Medium	1983	1,754
Mohawk Correctional Facility	Oneida	Medium	1988	1,167
Orleans Correctional Facility	Orleans	Medium	1986	1,082
Otisville Correctional Facility	Orange	Medium	1976	700
Queensboro Correctional Facility	Queens	Minimum	1975	416
Riverview Correctional Facility	St. Lawrence	Medium	1988	882
Shawangunk Correctional Facility	Ulster	Maximum	1983	558
Sing Sing Correctional Facility	Westchester	Maximum	1826	1,747
Taconic Correctional Facility	Westchester	Medium (female)	1973	387
Ulster Correctional Facility	Ulster	Medium	1990	882
Upstate Correctional Facility	Franklin	Maximum	1998	1,300
Wallkill Correctional Facility	Ulster	Medium	1933	606
Washington Correctional Facility	Washington	Medium	1985	882
Wende Correctional Facility	Erie	Maximum	1923	961
Woodbourne Correctional Facility	Sullivan	Medium	1933	849
Wyoming Correctional Facility	Wyoming	Medium	1984	1,722

== Closed ==
Facility	County	Security Level	Opened	Closed
Arthur Kill Correctional Facility	Richmond	Medium	1976	2011
Bare Hill Correctional Facility	Franklin	Medium	1988	2026
Bayview Correctional Facility	New York	Medium (female)	1970	2012
Beacon Correctional Facility	Dutchess	Minimum (female)	1991	2013
Buffalo Correctional Facility	Erie	Minimum		2012
Butler Correctional Facility	Wayne	Medium	1989	2014
Camp Gabriels	Franklin	Minimum	1982	2009
Camp Georgetown	Madison	Minimum	1961	2011
Camp Pharsalia	Chenango	Minimum		2010
Chateaugay Correctional Facility	Franklin	Medium	1990	2014
Downstate Correctional Facility	Dutchess	Maximum	1979	2022
Fulton Correctional Facility	Fulton	Medium	1975	2011
Gowanda Correctional Facility	Erie	Medium	1994	2021
Great Meadow Correctional Facility	Washington	Maximum	1911	2024
Lincoln Correctional Facility	New York	Minimum	1976	2019
Livingston Correctional Facility	Livingston	Medium	1991	2019
Lyon Mountain Correctional Facility	Clinton	Medium	1984	2011
Mid-Orange Correctional Facility	Orange	Medium	1977	2011
Monterey Shock Incarceration Correctional Facility	Schuyler	Minimum	1958	2014
Moriah Shock Incarceration Correctional Facility	Essex	Minimum	1989	2022
Mount McGregor Correctional Facility	Saratoga	Medium	1913	2014
Ogdensburg Correctional Facility	St. Lawrence	Medium	1982	2022
Oneida Correctional Facility	Oneida	Medium		2011
Parkside Correctional Facility	New York	Medium	1956	1996
Rochester Correctional Facility	Monroe	Minimum		2022
Southport Correctional Facility	Chemung	Maximum	1988	2022
Sullivan Correctional Facility	Sullivan	Maximum	1985	2024
Summit Shock Incarceration Correctional Facility	Schoharie	Minimum	1961	2011
Watertown Correctional Facility	Jefferson	Medium		2021
Willard Drug Treatment Campus	Seneca	Medium	1995	2022
Long Island Correctional Facility (Brentwood)	Suffolk	Medium Security	1982	1985
