= Ogdensburg Correctional Facility =

Medium-security state prison for male prisoners, located in New York, US

Coordinates: 44°43′31″N 75°26′45″W

- Interactive map of Ogdensburg Correctional Facility
- Location: One Correction Way Ogdensburg, New York
- Status: Closed
- Security class: medium
- Capacity: 557
- Opened: 1982
- Closed: 2022
- Managed by: New York State Department of Corrections and Community Supervision

Ogdensburg Correctional Facility was a medium-security state prison for male prisoners, located in the northern part of St. Lawrence County, New York, United States. The prison is located in the northeast corner of Ogdensburg near the St. Lawrence River. The facility closed in 2022.

The facility housed one of New York State's centers for sex offenders civilly committed. The facility was also used as a Federal Immigration Detention Facility for Immigration Court matters heard in Ulster County, New York.

Nearby Riverview Correctional Facility is also a medium-security prison.

== History and development ==
The prison operation took over the facilities of the former St. Lawrence Psychiatric Center (formerly, the Ogdensburg State Asylum for the Insane and the St. Lawrence State Hospital.) The original structures were adapted for prison use in 1982 and a new hospital was built. In addition, new housing units, built specifically for prison use, were completed in 1984. In 2023, 10 buildings will be demolished.
