= Upstate Correctional Facility =

State prison in Franklin County, New York, US

Coordinates: 44°53′13″N 74°19′28″W

- Interactive map of Upstate Correctional Facility
- Location: 309 Bare Hill Road Malone, New York
- Status: Operational
- Security class: Maximum / Supermax
- Capacity: 1300
- Opened: 1998
- Managed by: New York State Department of Corrections and Community Supervision

Upstate Correctional Facility is a maximum security state prison for men in Franklin County, New York, US. The prison, in the Town of Malone, was the first New York State prison built as a supermax.

Upstate C.F. is located near Franklin Correctional Facility and Bare Hill Correctional Facility, both medium security prisons.

Upstate C.F. was established in 1998 to house special prisoners with a history of assaultive behavior. Programs available to the prisoners are based on the acceptance of the established rules and other behavior indicating a degree of social conformity. Approximately 350 corrections officers, aided by more than 1000 remote cameras, supervise about 1300 prisoners.

Upstate is also a cadre facility. Cadre is the name of the program in which inmates are brought in to work around the prison grounds. The Cadre program holds approximately 300 inmates. The other 1000 inmates are in the SHU, special housing unit. The SHU is more commonly known as the box.

== History ==
Upstate, the 70th state prison to open in New York State, had a cost of $180 million (equivalent to $348 million in 2025). Prisoners were scheduled to arrive in July 1988. It was scheduled to open to have 370 prison guards and 1,500 prisoners, with two prisoners per cell.

Locals in Malone, New York originally had a positive reception to the prison as it had the possibility of bringing jobs to the local economy; the prison was scheduled to have 510 jobs, and the town's previous agricultural and factory sectors had faced enormous declines. The prison was scheduled to house a number of inmates making up about 33% of the town's population.

Jennifer Gonnerman of The Village Voice wrote that double celling prisoners together in solitary confinement had the potential to lead to prisoners killing one another. Prisoners who double cell lived in very close proximity to one another for almost all of the time. On May 12, 2000, 35-year old prisoner Donnell Brunson killed 42-year old Jose Quintana, a Panamanian man who was his cellmate.

== Facility ==
The prison, two stories tall, was initially designed with having two prisoners in one cell. The prison cells were pre-fabricated and brought to the prison construction site for assembly into the building. The prison was to have 800 security cameras.

The prison cells are by 8.5 feet (2,600 mm) by 14 feet (4,300 mm) and have plexiglas windows. The cells are larger than others in the New York state prison system.

== Notable Inmates ==
- Jonaiki Martinez Estrella- Bronx trinitarios gang member convicted of delivering the fatal stab wound in the murder of Lesandro Guzman-Feliz
- Ralph "Bucky" Phillips- Sentenced to life without parole for the shooting of three New York State Troopers in 2006 after escaping from jail.

== See also ==
- List of New York state prisons
