= Chateaugay Correctional Facility =

Prison in New York, United States

Coordinates: 44°55′32″N 74°03′22″W

- Interactive map of Chateaugay Correctional Facility
- Location: Chateaugay, New York, United States
- Status: Closed
- Opened: 1990
- Closed: July 26, 2014

Chateaugay Correctional Facility (ASACTC) was a medium-security prison and state alcohol and substance abuse Correctional Treatment Center in Franklin County, New York, United States. The prison is in the town of Chateaugay. The prison encompassed about 99 acres and 30 structures on-site, mostly single-story metal buildings on concrete slab foundations.

The prison opened in 1990. What used to be known as an ASACTC correctional program has now turned into a facility for repeat parole violators as of the mid-2000s. Before it closed in 2014, most of the inmates in the prison were there for violating parole, doing short sentences. Around 2013 or 2014, it housed on the order of 200 inmates.

== Closure and sale ==
Chateaugay closed on July 26, 2014 due to declining incarceration rates in New York, along with a number of other prisons; between 1999 and 2018, the state's prison population decreased by 30%. According to one official, this was due to a drop in the crime rate in the state. The closure relocated about 110 prison jobs away from the area, and was fought by some local officials and residents for local economic reasons. Local officials attempted to negotiate with the state to have the prison redeployed as a juvenile detention facility in 2017 instead of Adirondack Correctional Facility, which was at the time being considered for becoming a juvenile detention site, but did not succeed.

The former prison was put up for public auction on July 24, 2018. The property listing described it as a "strategic location" for Canadian companies serving the U.S. due to its location 10 miles from Quebec and Ontario and about an hour and a half from Montreal. The sale was announced the same day to the Canadian company Adar Investment Inc. for $600,000, approval pending by the New York Office of General Services, Offices of the Attorney General, and State Comptroller. Adar Investment stated they hoped for it to be used as a Jewish summer camp.

== See also ==
- List of New York state prisons
