= Mid-Orange Correctional Facility =

Former medium-security state prison for men located in New York, US

Coordinates: 41°16′35″N 74°18′01″W

- Interactive map of Mid-Orange Correctional Facility
- Location: Warwick (town), New York
- Status: Closed
- Security class: Medium security
- Population: 572 (2011)
- Opened: June 19, 1977
- Closed: October 1, 2011

Mid-Orange Correctional Facility was an all-male, medium security prison located in the Town of Warwick, New York. It closed in 2011.

== History ==
The site of Mid-Orange Correctional Facility was between 1932 and 1977 the home of the New York State Training School for Boys. The facility was constructed on May 19, 1932, for the care of delinquent boys. The school had a capacity of 500, housing those primarily between the ages of 13 and 15. The school attracted the attention of Eleanor Roosevelt, and she wrote four My Day columns about the experiences of the boys in the school. In 1971, the school, as well as others in the state, were transferred from Department of Social Services to the Division for Youth, which had a focus on deinstitutionalisation. The school was closed in 1976.

The New York State Department of Correctional Services took over the facility in late 1976. The facility was renovated to be a prison, with new buildings and a perimeter fence built. The Mid-Orange Correctional Facility received its first inmates on June 29, 1977. The intended prison population was 400, but capacity was increased to 1000 due to demand placed on prisoners during the war on drugs. Prison capacity eventually settled on 750.

The prison was also the site of a strike by state prison employees in 1979. National Guardsmen were sent to the prison as strikebreakers, and were quartered in employee housing. This resulted in the only known caselaw for the Third Amendment, the US 2nd Circuit Court of Appeals case Engblom v. Carey.

On June 30, 2011, Governor Andrew Cuomo announced that Mid-Orange Correctional Facility was listed among seven prisons to be closed as part of a prison closing program to reduce government expenditure. The other prisons closed were Arthur Kill, Buffalo, Fulton, Mt. McGregor, Oneida, and Summit. Mid-Orange Correctional Facility closed completely on October 1. Of the 227 security staff, 212 were transferred to other correctional facilities, whilst 55 of the 100 civilian staff were transferred.

=== Redevelopment ===
On June 28, 2013, New York State Comptroller Thomas DiNapoli signed off on transferring the facility to Warwick. The transfer was completed on March 6, 2014. The former grounds of the prison were split into two lots: 600 acres designated to become woodlands and public parks, and roughly 150 acres designated for commercial development. In 2013, a private non-profit organisation, the Warwick Valley Local Development Corporation (WVLDC), formed by Warwick Town Supervisor Mike Sweeton, was established to promote commercial development. The WVLDC secured US$3,700,000 in private equity to pay New York State for the commercial development land, whilst the woodlands were transferred to Warwick for a nominal fee of US$1. On September 26, 2015, Wickham Woodlands Park opened.

The commercial redevelopment of the site became Warwick Valley Office & Technology Corporate Park. Redevelopment and infrastructural improvements to the site were expected to cost US$7,500,000, with state funding suppliying US$3,000,000. On July 26, 2024, the WVLDC announced it had completed the redevelopment with the sale of the last parcel. Businesses on the site include the Hudson Sports Complex, Drowned Lands Brewery, as well as cannabis industry companies Green Thumb Industries, UrbanXtracts, Phyto-Farma labs, and Citiva Medical.

Remaining buildings of the former prison and school are the subject of haunted house tours and ghost hunting.

== Notable prisoners ==
- Gerald Garson, former New York Supreme Court Justice, convicted of accepting bribes
