= DOCCS =

DOCCS may refer to:

- New York State Department of Corrections and Community Supervision
- Direct ocean carbon capture and storage, also known as marine carbon dioxide removal
