= Ralph "Bucky" Phillips =

American murderer (born 1962)

Ralph Phillips

FBI Ten Most Wanted Fugitive
- Charges: Unlawful flight to avoid prosecution, escape, aggravated murder, attempted aggravated murder
- Alias: "Bucky" Phillips

Description
- Born: Ralph James Phillips; June 19, 1962 (age 64); United States
- Occupation: Bus driver

Status
- Added: September 7, 2006
- Caught: September 8, 2006
- Number: 483
- Captured

Ralph James "Bucky" Phillips (born June 19, 1962) is a convicted murderer from Western New York arrested on September 8, 2006, by the Pennsylvania State Police. A warrant was issued for his arrest following the shooting of three New York State troopers, one of whom died from his wounds.

On September 7, 2006, he became the 483rd fugitive listed by the FBI on the Ten Most Wanted list. Prior to his capture, Phillips attained the distinction of being one of the few fugitives ever to be simultaneously on the FBI Ten Most Wanted Fugitives list and U.S. Marshal Service's Top 15 list. He replaced Warren Jeffs on the FBI's list and was apprehended the day after he was added.

== Early life ==
Phillips was raised in Stockton, New York. He spent much of his life on the run, starting as a child by running away from his abusive father.

== Prior criminal history ==
Phillips has an extensive history in the New York State correctional system prior to his April 2006 escape from the Erie County Correctional Facility in Alden, New York. He had previously been convicted on three counts of burglary in the third degree, two counts of grand larceny in the fourth degree, and other crimes.

During a transfer out of Chautauqua County Jail, he left a note threatening "to splatter pig meat all over Chautauqua County", with the term "pig" being derogatory slang for a police officer.

At the time of his escape, he was serving a 90-day sentence for violating the terms of his parole. He had been released in November 2005 after a burglary conviction, but failed to report to his parole officer, so he was again arrested on January 6.

There is some controversy about the events leading to the revocation of his parole. Family members claim that the ex-husband of Phillips' ex-girlfriend Kasey Crowe intentionally misinformed Phillips' parole officer in a ploy to return him to jail. It is believed that the ex-husband fabricated a story about being threatened by Phillips.

In 2006 people close to Phillips say that he was not a violent person and was looking forward to rebuilding a relationship with his daughter and grandchildren.

== Fugitive events ==
Phillips was being held in Erie County jail for a parole violation, but escaped on April 2, 2006, and was on the run until September 8, 2006. He escaped by cutting through the corrugated metal roof of the facility's kitchen using a can opener. He is believed to have stolen numerous vehicles and broken into several cabins across Western New York and Warren County, Pennsylvania and McKean County, Pennsylvania. Police believe that at some point, he walked on Oliver Road looking for people to pick him up.

During the earlier phases of the hunt, Phillips acquired somewhat of a folk hero status, with local businesses selling T-shirts saying "Where's Bucky?", "Run, Bucky, Run!", "Don't Shoot, Not Bucky", or "Got Bucky?" (a parody of Got Milk?), a local restaurant selling a "Bucky Burger" (because it was served in a 'to-go' box for those on the run), and a local folk musician, Noah Gokey, releasing a single entitled "Run Bucky Run!". With Phillips' local roots, it was suspected that numerous friends and relatives might have been sheltering him.

== First shooting ==
On June 10, 2006, around 1:00 a.m., State Trooper Sean Brown was shot in Veteran, New York. Brown had seen a Ford Mustang which had been reported stolen, and as he approached the vehicle, the driver, who was later identified as Phillips, shot at him and sped off. The officer was seriously injured with gunshot wounds to the abdomen. On June 27, after reports of stolen vehicles and break-ins, police in Chautauqua County, New York, found an abandoned backpack containing items tied to Phillips and the .38 caliber handgun he had allegedly used in the June 10 incident.

On August 8, police were minutes behind Phillips after he was reported on the Tuscarora Indian Reservation in Niagara County, New York; however, he disappeared into the woods. On August 19, a policeman checking out a motorcycle with invalid tags spotted Phillips and chased him into an apartment complex. Once inside, the officer discovered a group of people believed to have been hiding Bucky for several days, who were subsequently arrested. Phillips, however, escaped once more.

== Second shooting ==
When Phillips learned that members of his family would be detained for questioning, he reportedly threatened police, warning them to stay away from his friends and family. During a stakeout of his ex-girlfriends’s house on August 31 in the town of Pomfret in Chautauqua County, a second shooting took place. Police believe Phillips shot two New York State Troopers with a high-powered rifle: Donald Baker Jr., 38, and Joseph Longobardo, 32. Eleven shots were fired in total. Trooper Baker was struck in the right flank, with the bullet exiting the left flank, and was flown to Hamot Shock Trauma Center in Erie, Pennsylvania. Trooper Longobardo was struck in the leg, severing an artery, and was flown to Erie County Medical Center in Buffalo. On Sunday, September 3, 2006, Trooper Longobardo died following an unsuccessful attempt to save his life by amputating his leg. On November 9, 2006, Baker was released from Hamot and transferred by NYSP helicopter to Albany Medical Center to continue his recovery. Shortly after the second shooting, the reward for information leading to the arrest of Phillips topped $450,000.

Kasey Crowe, Phillips' ex-girlfriend and mother of his daughter, was immediately sent back to jail due to her bail being revoked. She was later released.

== Capture ==
Phillips was captured by Pennsylvania State Police at around 8:00 pm (EDT) on Friday, September 8, 2006, in Warren County, Pennsylvania. Phillips was captured, according to the AP, without gunfire. Phillips, who was hiding in a lightly wooded area at the time of his capture, was spotted by a Warren County Sheriffs Deputy from a distance, who relayed the message to the troopers in the immediate area. As the police officers surrounded him, Phillips surrendered, with his hands raised.

Phillips was originally charged by the United States Marshals Service with "interstate flight to avoid prosecution." Federal authorities then waived their charges so New York State could proceed with attempted murder charges against Phillips as a result of the shooting of Trooper Sean Brown. Numerous other state and federal charges are pending. Murder and a second attempted murder charges could be filed if evidence is produced which ties Phillips to the shootings of Troopers Baker and Longobardo.

It was announced on September 11 that New York State Police found a .308 rifle on September 10 in the woods where Phillips was believed to have spent time before his capture on September 8. Forensic tests were conducted on the weapon.

On November 29, 2006, Phillips pleaded guilty (or, in his own words, "guilty as hell") to charges of aggravated murder (for the shooting of Joseph Longobardo) and attempted aggravated murder (for the shooting of Donald Baker Jr. and Sean Brown). On December 19 he was sentenced in Chautauqua County Court to life without parole for shooting and killing Trooper Longobardo and 40 years to life for shooting and wounding Trooper Baker. On December 20 he was sentenced in Chemung County Court to 40 years to life for shooting and wounding Trooper Brown. He is serving his sentence at Upstate Correctional Facility in Malone, New York (Franklin County).

== Manhunt controversy ==
=== Police competency and actions ===
Some residents were annoyed and angered by the search for Phillips by the Erie County Sheriff's office. Calls to the sheriff were said to have been met with responses that included "we can't disclose that information." Lives were disrupted. Helicopters flew low over households at early hours, spooking livestock, waking residents, and scaring children.

Police competency was questioned by local residents. For months, a sighting would occur, and Phillips would get away. Some locals referred to police as "Keystones" or began cheering Phillips being on the loose and his ability to escape capture, despite being having been sighted and despite the hundreds of troopers brought into Chautauqua County. No figures have been officially released, but some reports state that New York State spent $8 million on the manhunt from April until August 2006.

Many locals resented the police presence. New York State Police was also criticized for not involving local law enforcement agencies in the search. The police experienced "deficiencies" with the radio system and started to use their phones to communicate in the belief that Phillips was monitoring dispatches.

On June 15, 2006, the story went from local to national when The New York Times covered the manhunt and the situation. After the shootings on August 31, some national news media expressed disbelief that residents were not pleased with the search for the fugitive. News organizations tried to explain why Phillips repeatedly avoided capture.

Allegations of warrantless searches of the homes of Phillips' family members were made. The police were alleged to have searched the property of residents unrelated to Phillips without warrants or informing owners. Residents reported their wire horse fencing had been cut by police on ATV's, endangering their animals. Residents were both inconvenienced, were angry at the heavy police presence due to the proximity of an escaped convict, and some were even fearful of the police due to the shooting of Brad Horton.

Several family members—Patrina Wright, 23, Phillip's daughter, Kasey Crowe, 42, Wright's mother, and Norma Gloss, 65, Crowe's mother—were watched, followed and allegedly harassed by police. Family members started carrying video cameras so they could document the police harassment they claimed they were experiencing. Several family members pressed charges against the police, including Gloss, for a shoulder injury that resulted from being slammed against a wall by police and Wright, for being kicked in the stomach while she was eight months pregnant.

The alleged harassment of family members went on during the course of the search. New York State Troopers aided by FBI agents supposedly interrogated Wright's five-year-old son at Wheelock Primary School without Wright's knowledge or permission. Using this testimony and the testimony of an unidentified 6-year-old girl, troopers arrested Wright, Crowe and Richard Catanese, Wright's boyfriend, on charges of endangering the welfare of a child. Wright's three children, including a three-week-old nursing infant were put into protective custody and Wright was not allowed to see them for four days. Her children were returned a week later. It is believed that the shooting of troopers Baker and Longobardo were the result of Phillip's anger about his grandchildren being taken away from his daughter.

After Phillips was captured community leaders and citizens expressed their gratitude for the persistent efforts of the New York State Troopers in tracking down the fugitive. From conflicting reports on the mindset of different segments of the western New York community it is apparent that some citizens felt threatened by the large police presence in the rural part of the state while others were worried about their safety in the proximity of an escaped convict.

Following the investigation to the hunt for Phillips, New York State Troopers PBA President Daniel De Federicis released a letter to Governor George Pataki and other state officials detailing problems during the search. The thrust of the letter is that state troopers were given inadequate equipment and weapons for the search, State Police commanders engaged in turf battles over personnel from various parts of the state, and asserts the FBI pulled out of the search allegedly after State Police commanders made it known other agencies were not welcome in the search.

=== Shooting of Brad Horton ===
On June 26, 2006, police were looking for Phillips in the town of Sheridan in Chautauqua County, due to vehicles believed to have been stolen by Phillips being seen there. Trooper Sean Pierce stopped Bradley Horton, 25, on his ATV. The police and the local resident's accounts of the subsequent events differ.

The police claim that Horton sped away, dragging the officer, while friends of Horton claim that no one was dragged. The New York State Trooper shot Horton, fatally injuring him. Friends of Horton claim they were kept from the area and were not allowed to find him to get medical assistance to him. Horton called his wife and 911 as he lay dying in the field. His family was also unable to search for him. Eventually, Chautauqua County Sheriff officers were let onto the scene and located Horton. He was flown by helicopter to Hamot Medical Center in Erie, Pennsylvania, but died that evening.

The medical examiner's report showed five gunshot wounds to the back, with no upward angle present in the entry wounds. This evidence contradicts the trooper's account of shooting Horton while being dragged by the ATV. How the trooper was allegedly dragged has not been explained.

Initially, the media reported this shooting as a separate incident, unrelated to the search for Phillips. However, many residents reported hearing the trooper on their police scanners say "I got him. I shot Bucky. Or I at least shot the guy who was with him." Others reported hearing troopers say that "they had 'the suspect,' and someone should notify Erie County."

Police recordings of that evening's communication have disappeared. The trooper, Sean Pierce, returned to work that evening as his injuries were not serious.

Angered residents pressured the Chautauqua County District Attorney to investigate the incident and seek justice for Horton's family. The shooting was investigated by the New York State Police bureau of criminal investigation and the Chautauqua County District Attorney's office. Following the investigation, on September 29, 2006, a grand jury in Chautauqua County decided not to indict Trooper Pierce in the shooting.
