= New York State Division of Parole =

- Common name: New York State Parole

Agency overview
- Formed: July 1, 1930
- Dissolved: April 1, 2011 (merged to form the New York State Department of Corrections and Community Supervision)

Jurisdictional structure
- Operations jurisdiction: New York, USA
- Area: 54,556 square miles (141,300 km^{2})
- Population: 19.4 million
- Legal jurisdiction: New York
- General nature: Civilian police

Operational structure
- Headquarters: Albany, New York

Website
- https://doccs.ny.gov/employment/parole-officer

The New York State Division of Parole was an agency of the government of New York within the New York State Correctional Services from 1930 to 2011. § 259. "1. There shall be in the executive department of state government a state division of parole" responsible for parole, the supervised release of a prisoner before the completion of his/her sentence. In 2011, the agency merged with the Department of Correctional Services to form the New York State Department of Corrections and Community Supervision.

== History of Parole in New York State ==
In 1817, the nation's first "good time" law, rewarding prison inmates with time off their period of imprisonment for good behavior, was approved in New York State. In 1824, indeterminate sentencing for juveniles was established.

In 1867, the Prison Association appointed a committee to prepare a plan for revision of New York's prison system, based upon United Kingdom penal reforms. (Note: American penal reformers began to take notice of developments in the United Kingdom. In 1864, Dr. Enoch C. Wines, secretary of the New York Prison Association, published a pamphlet entitled "Progress of Prison Reform in England," in which he described the work of Maconochie and Crofton. Additionally, in 1866, Gaylord B. Hubbell, then warden of Sing Sing Prison, visited Ireland in order to investigate Crofton's system, which, in a subsequent report to the New York Prison Association, he recommended be introduced to New York. Consequently, in 1867, the Prison Association appointed a committee to prepare a plan for revision of New York's prison system.) In preparing their report, the Prison Association's committee visited prisons throughout the United States and Canada, including the Detroit House of Corrections, then under the supervision of Zebulon Brockway. The resulting report called for the creation of "reformatories," institutions specifically designed to "teach and train the prisoner in such a manner that, on his discharge, he may be able to resist temptation and inclined to lead an upright, worthy life." Subsequently, in 1869, New York governor John T. Hoffman endorsed the report, and the legislature authorized the creation of what would become, on its completion in May 1876, the New York State Reformatory at Elmira – the world's first reformatory prison for "youthful offenders," first-time male offenders between the ages of 16 and 30.

=== Reformatories ===
New York would pay special attention to the Declaration of Principles adopted by Congress (Note: In 1870, American penal reformers keenly aware of European developments – including Wines, Brockway, and then-Ohio governor and future United States president Rutherford B. Hayes – gathered in Cincinnati under the banner of the National Congress on Penitentiary and Reformatory Discipline. Speakers at the Congress included Crofton, who advocated for his Irish system, and Brockway, who helped author the Declaration of Principles adopted by the Congress. The Declaration, grounded on the assumption that "criminals, especially of the younger class, are capable of reformation by the application of right methods and processes", incorporated references to Crofton's Irish system; endorsed systems of marks and graded classifications, indeterminate sentences, and early release via parole; and cited favorably New York's earlier legislation on "good time" commutation and indeterminate sentences for juveniles.) in creating its juvenile reformatory at Elmira, of which the state hired Brockway as superintendent. The 1876 law officially establishing Elmira called for five "respectable citizens" to serve as its board of managers. While the 1876 act did not call for indeterminate sentencing or parole, 1877 legislation drafted by Brockway required that all Elmira inmates serve indefinite sentences: while prisoners were technically sentenced to six years, they could be paroled any time at the discretion of the Board of Managers. The 1877 law contained as well the first statutory use in the United States of the word "parole," used in place of "conditional discharge."

=== Guardians ===
New York's statutory introduction of parole in 1877 represented the first official use in the United States of both the term and its practice.

=== Parole process ===
Although allowed, a system of parole would not be instituted at Elmira until 1882, when Brockway established the factors to be determined in assessing each inmate's suitability for early release: offense, offense history, institutional behavior, work record, academic progress, attitude, future plans, and – most importantly – perceived threat of recidivism. Inmates were required to secure employment and a place to live before their release on parole. After release, parolees were required to follow four rules designed to make certain they became "good workers" and "good citizens." First, they had to remain employed for six months. Second, they had to submit a monthly report, signed by their employer, showing their income and expenses and providing "a general statement" of their lives and "surroundings." Third, they could not quit or change jobs. Fourth, they were required to "conduct [themselves] with honesty, sobriety, and decency; [avoid] evil or low associations; and . . . abstain from intoxicating drinks." Parolees who violated any of these conditions had their parole revoked.

=== Reception ===
Brockway's parole system was widely seen as successful – not least due to his affinity for public relations – and, in 1900, the United States government included in reports submitted to the International Prison Commission an essay by Brockway on his Elmira system. There, Brockway summed up his commitment to penal reform rather than retribution:

It can not be denied that there is in the economy of moral government of the Supreme Ruler that which is retributive – the equitable balancing of painful consequences to sinful acts-a beneficent and truly remedial agency; but the function is super human. No sanctions of human laws, no court or prison system, no man or association of men ever can properly attempt to administer retribution to criminals for their crimes. It is impossible to justly administer it, and it is also abundantly in evidence that the futile attempts to minister just punishments for crimes, under the laws and practice, constitutes a serious obstruction to the only sure public protection from the criminal – namely, his reformation.

However, Brockway's success was tempered by accusations of corruption and abuse. A Board of Charities inquiry conducted in 1893 and 1894 found that Elmira was a brutal and ineffective prison, allegations which would haunt the rest of Brockway's tenure. In 1900, the same year Brockway extolled the virtues of his reformatory system to the International Prison Commission, Governor Theodore Roosevelt replaced three Elmira managers who supported Brockway, shortly after which the other two managers resigned. Brockway himself resigned soon thereafter. In 1901, Elmira's new board of managers, echoing the Board of Charities inquiry, published a critique of the reformatory in its annual report, citing its poor physical condition, inadequate medical care, administrative corruption, and brutal disciplinary techniques including flogging.

=== 20th century ===
Nevertheless, Brockway's reforms had proved popular, and indeterminate sentencing spread widely through the US in the wake of his tenure at Elmira, and, in 1907, New York became the first state to adopt all the components of a modern parole system: indeterminate sentencing, a system for granting release, post-release supervision, and specific criteria for parole revocation.

On April 1, 2011, the Division of Parole was once again merged with the New York State Department of Correctional Services to form the New York State Department of Corrections and Community Supervision.

== See also ==
- List of law enforcement agencies in New York
- Parole
- New York State Department of Correctional Services
- New York State Division of Probation and Correctional Alternatives
- New York City Department of Corrections
- New York City Department of Probation
- ParoleWatch
