= Timeline of strikes in 1979 =

Strikes in 1979

A number of labour strikes, labour disputes, and other industrial actions occurred in 1979.

== Background ==
A labor strike is a work stoppage, caused by the mass refusal of employees to work, usually in response to employee grievances, such as low pay or poor working conditions. Strikes can also take place to demonstrate solidarity with workers in other workplaces or to pressure governments to change policies.

== Timeline ==
=== Continuing strikes from 1978 ===
- 1978–1980 ABC Paulista strikes, in the ABC Region of Brazil.
- 1978 Inco strike
- 1978-79 Puretex Knitting Company strike, by Puretex Knitting Company workers in Toronto, Canada, against workplace surveillance.
- 1975-80 Sonacotra rent strike, rent strike by immigrant workers in France.
- 1977-79 Wien Air Alaska strike, 22-month strike by Wien Air Alaska pilots.
- Winter of Discontent, a period of widespread strikes in the United Kingdom.

=== January ===
- 1979 Newport News strike, by shipbuilders at Newport News Shipbuilding.

=== February ===
- 1979 New Orleans police strike

=== March ===
- 1979 Christmas Island miners strike
- 1979 white South African mineworkers' strike, by the exclusively white Mine Workers' Union in support of apartheid.

=== April ===
- 1979 Boston University strike
- 1979 NASL strike, 5-day strike by North American Soccer League players.
- 1979 New York prison guards' strike, 16-day strike by prison guards in the American state of New York.
- 1979 Raymondville Onion Strike

=== May ===
- 1979 Gary bus strike, 2-week strike by Gary Public Transportation Corporation bus drivers in Gary, Indiana.

=== June ===
- 1979 British Columbian longshoremen's strike, 10-day strike by longshoremen in British Columbia, Canada.
- 1979 The Times of India strike, 9-week strike by The Times of India staff, the longest since 1968.

=== July ===
- 1979 Seafarer Yachts strike, by workers at Seafarer Yachts in Huntington, New York.
- 1979 Temple University Hospital strike, 10-day strike at Temple University Hospital.

=== August ===
- 1979 Rotterdam port strike, by dock workers in Rotterdam, the Netherlands.
- 1979 Wetzel County Hospital strike
- 1979 World Airways strike, 131-day strike by World Airways workers.
- YH incident, sit-in protest by textile workers in Seoul, South Korea

=== September ===
- 1979 Emery Air Freight strike, 16-day strike by Emery Air Freight drivers and clerical workers, represented by the International Brotherhood of Teamsters.
- 1979 Minnesota Orchestra strike, the first in the Minnesota Orchestra history.
- 1979 New Zealand general strike

=== October ===
- 1979 Hawaii public sector strike, demanding pay raises.

=== November ===
- 1979 Cleveland teachers' strike, by teachers in Cleveland, United States, represented by the Cleveland Teachers Union.
- 1979–1980 International Harvester strike

=== December ===
- 1979 Air Portugal strike, 60-day strike by Air Portugal flight engineers.
- 1979 Chicago transit strike, by Chicago Transit Authority workers in the United States, the first since 1922.
- 1979 Spanish docks strike
- 1979 Sweden dentists' strike

== Commentary ==
The United States Department of Labor reported that the number of working days lost to work stoppages in the United States in April 1979 was the highest in a single month in nine years.
