= Livingston Correctional Facility =

Former medium-security state prison in New York, US

Coordinates: 42°40′50″N 77°49′21″W

- Interactive map of Livingston Correctional Facility
- Location: 7005 Sonyea Road Sonyea, New York
- Status: Closed
- Security class: medium
- Capacity: 881
- Opened: 1991
- Closed: 2019
- Managed by: New York State Department of Corrections and Community Supervision

Livingston Correctional Facility was a medium security state prison in Sonyea, Livingston County, New York, owned and operated by the New York State Department of Corrections and Community Supervision. Livingston was opened in 1991, held 881 adult male inmates at medium security level, and was immediately adjacent to the state's Groveland Correctional Facility. It was closed on September 1, 2019.
