= John Jamelske =

American serial rapist and kidnapper (born 1935)

- Mug shot of Jamelske following his arrest
- Born: John Thomas Jamelske; May 9, 1935 (age 91); Syracuse, New York, U.S.
- Other names: Syracuse Dungeon Master; Boogeyman of Syracuse
- Occupations: Retired as of arrest, previously a real estate investor, handyman, and carpenter
- Spouse: Dorothy Richmond (m. 1959; died 1999)
- Children: 3
- Status: Incarcerated at Mohawk Correctional Facility
- Conviction: First degree kidnapping (5 counts)
- Penalty: 18 years to life (eligible for parole in June 2023)

John Thomas Jamelske (born May 9, 1935) is an American serial rapist and kidnapper who, from 1988 to his apprehension in 2003, kidnapped a series of girls and women and held them captive in a concrete bunker beneath the yard of his home in Fayetteville, New York, a suburb of Syracuse, New York, United States. Jamelske pleaded guilty to five counts of first-degree kidnapping, and is currently serving a term of 18 years to life.

== Before abductions ==
Jamelske was born and raised in the DeWitt area. He graduated from Fayetteville High School in 1953. In September 1959, he married Dorothy Richmond, a schoolteacher with whom he had three sons. At this time, he worked at Acme Market and other grocery stores. Later he started working in a series of blue-collar jobs, as a handyman and carpenter.

Over the years, Jamelske amassed over $1 million, which he invested in real estate in California. Jamelske and his wife lived in a three-bedroom single-family home at 7070 Highbridge Road in Fayetteville, New York. Jamelske's wife Dorothy became bedridden from disease in 1988 and died in 1999.

== Abductions ==
In October 1988, Jamelske abducted his first victim, a 14-year-old Native American girl. He held her captive for over two years, and she had turned 17 by the time he released her. Jamelske compelled her to his will by threatening violence against her younger brother. She made no attempt to report to authorities after Jamelske released her.

In approximately March 1995, Jamelske abducted a 14-year-old Latina runaway whom he lured under the premise of paying her to deliver a secret package. The girl entered his bunker (which he called "the dungeon") and Jamelske closed the door behind her. Eventually Jamelske put a blindfold on her and drove her to her mother's apartment and dropped her off. Although he also threatened her family, she went to the police with a description. Because of her previous drug use, they questioned the credibility of her story and dropped the investigation shortly after.

On August 31, 1997, Jamelske kidnapped a 53-year-old Vietnamese woman off the street. She was a foreign refugee who spoke little English. He forced her into his car and took her to an abandoned house, where he raped her. Then he tied her to a stack of flattened cardboard boxes and drove her to his house. He raped her daily while holding her captive, and also forced her to fulfill various menial tasks for him. He released her on May 23, 1998, at a Greyhound bus station, with $50. She reported to the police that day, but nothing came of it. She claimed that the police did not believe her, but Syracuse Police spokesman Sgt. Thomas Connellan stated that they investigated all leads, none of which panned out.

On May 11, 2001, Jamelske offered a ride home to a 26-year-old white woman walking in downtown Syracuse while under the influence of LSD, which the woman accepted due to the poor weather. Jamelske took her back to his bunker, where he raped her daily. When she resisted, Jamelske inflicted cigar burns on her, from which she developed an abscess on her lower back. Jamelske also manipulated her with claims that he was actually part of an underground slavery syndicate, of which the police were a part. The victim wanted to write home to her parents letting them know she was alive, and while Jamelske did agree he insisted she tell them that she was in a drug rehabilitation clinic.

After the 2001 victim's release, police investigations were complicated by the letter she had been forced by Jamelske to write. Further complicating the case was the rape kit test showing no evidence of sexual assault, showing that—at least for the several days prior to releasing her—Jamelske had no sexual contact with the victim. The victim also told police that he drove a tan 1974 Mercury Comet. Police searched for registered vehicles matching this description in the New York area and came up with a single hit. However, the lead did not pan out due to the victim's description of the vehicle not matching with the one discovered. Due to this inconsistency, the investigating officers closed the case. It is noted that, despite that body style being available from 1971 to 1977, police failed to search any other year, as the car Jamelske drove was a 1975 Mercury Comet of the same color.

Representatives from the Syracuse police appeared on Dateline NBC and criticized the woman for providing insufficient information. In another interview on the program Cold Case Files, an Onondaga Sheriff's Department detective stated:

Well, at the time, it was difficult: I've had a couple of missing adults who were missing because they wanted to be missing.

The victim claimed during the same program:

... they [the police] didn't believe me, all because of the letter I wrote about the drug rehab. They thought I was making up some story or something.

Concerning the letter written by the victim to her family, the detective again stated:

[The letter was] read and examined by the family members [of the missing woman], and the family all said it was her handwriting, it was her vocabulary, and they weren't suspicious at all that it was anything other than her writing ... So from a standpoint of us investigating a missing person case, the case was closed.

=== Discovery ===
In October 2002, Jamelske picked up his final abductee, a 16-year-old African American runaway from Syracuse. On April 3, 2003, Jamelske felt confident enough to take the girl out to karaoke at a local bar. Emboldened by this success, he then took her on another public outing, where she slipped away from him long enough to phone her sister. The girl's sister checked the caller ID and dialed the number back, which turned out to be a bottle return center located in Manlius. The older sister persuaded the employee who answered the phone to call 9-1-1. The employee in turn called her boss, who was working at a local pet store several blocks away, telling him that Jamelske—who was scheduled to visit him at the store shortly—had apparently kidnapped a young girl and had been raping her. After Jamelske and the girl had made their visit and left, the boss immediately called the police; Jamelske was tracked down and arrested shortly thereafter.

All of Jamelske's victims were of different ethnic origins: Native American, Latino, Vietnamese, black, and white. The district attorney who prosecuted Jamelske stated:

All five of these women are of different races ... I don't believe that's a coincidence—I believe that in his distorted mind this was another form of collection. (in reference to Jamelske's apparent compulsive hoarding behavior.)

== After discovery ==
Jamelske pleaded guilty to five counts of first-degree kidnapping, and is currently serving a term of 18 years to life. Part of his guilty plea agreement was that his assets would be sold off and divided among his victims. In a prison interview with MSNBC, Jamelske said that he should not be punished for what he did and that, once arrested, he had thought he would at the most spend a couple of days in jail, pay a fine, or perform community service. He said that his lawyers had to spend several days after his arrest to make it clear to him that taking women and holding them in a dungeon is kidnapping. Jamelske is currently housed in the Mohawk Correctional Facility. On December 22, 2020, Jamelske was denied parole in his first appearance before the parole board. He was denied parole again on December 22, 2022 and in October 2023.

In 2004, MSNBC produced episode 12 of their MSNBC Reports series subtitled "Sex Bunker" on the Jamelske case, periodically rebroadcast several times a year as part of their "doc block" documentary marathons. The case is also covered in the book True Stories of Law & Order: SVU: The Real Crimes Behind the Best Episodes of the Hit TV Show by Kevin Dwyer and Juré Fiorillo.

=== The "dungeon" ===
Police found Jamelske's residence to be systematically filled with miscellaneous items of little or no value: newspapers, magazines, beer bottles, receipts spanning two decades, etc. Further down into the basement, behind a storage shelf, police discovered the bunker in which Jamelske kept his victims: a steel door leading to an 8 foot (2.4 m) long tunnel which had to be traversed on hands and knees, leading to yet another steel door, which finally led to a room 8 feet (2.4 m) high, 24 feet (7.3 m) long and 12 feet (3.7 m) wide. The entry was a small box located just under the top of the room, so the person entering had to turn around and step down into the room via a small three-rung ladder. Jamelske would tie his victims up with a chain that connected to an ankle bracelet.

The dungeon had many things written on the wall, most notably religious phrases as well as numerous peace symbols. When police found the dungeon they contacted one of the known victims to link Jamelske to her testimony by asking what three words were written on the wall. She correctly responded "Wall of Thugs". A crucifix hung by the door, next to "PEACE TO ALL WHO ENTER HERE", as well as the words "HATE" and "READY TO RUCUSS [sic], SO BRING ON THE PAIN" in deep crimson.

In the center of the room was a stained bathtub on top of a raised wooden deck. It was here that the victims were forced to bathe using a garden hose. There was a drain plug but no plumbing—when the tub was drained, the water had nowhere to go but on the cement floor of the dungeon where it remained until it evaporated, making the room damp and moldy. An aluminum frame chair with no seat was positioned over a pail—a crude toilet. A clock radio sat on top of a filthy portable refrigerator. Next to a yellow extension cord which ran out from a hole in the top of the walls was an 8 inch (200mm) diameters aluminum hose that pumped warm air from the house furnace.

There was also a series of calendars in which the victims systematically had to mark each day. Some dates were marked with the letters "B", "S", and "T". Investigators later discovered these letters were made by the victims who were made to record each date they were raped (S), bathed (B), or brushed their teeth (T). The collective timespan of the calendars covered 15 years.

Police found several video recorded entries with at least one woman on the tape. In the tapes, the viewer can see Jamelske dancing, singing, and also exercising with said woman. Jamelske often told his captives that he was a part of the Onondaga County Sheriff's Department and had shown a fake badge he had found on the street years earlier, as well as telling them that he was under certain bosses that were making him do this. He told his victims under this story that the easier the daily rapes could occur the faster his bosses might let the girls out. In the video tape police found, the viewer can see the victim pleading with the potential "bosses" that it would be better if she were home.

== See also ==
- List of long-term false imprisonment cases
