= Brian Fischer =

American politician

Brian S. Fischer was the Commissioner of the New York State Department of Correctional Services, the fourth largest state prison system in the United States. He was appointed by former Governor of New York Eliot Spitzer in 2007 and retired in 2013. He was previously superintendent (the official title in New York equivalent to that of a prison warden) of Sing Sing Prison. He has spent his entire career in the Correctional Services department since receiving his B.S. in Psychology from Upsala College in 1966 and an M.S. from the University of Bridgeport in 1968.
