= Arthur Kill Correctional Facility =

Closed prison in New York City, US

Coordinates: 40°33′02″N 74°13′43″W

Arthur Kill Correctional Facility was a medium security correctional facility on Arthur Kill Road in Charleston, Staten Island, New York City. It operated from 1976 to 2011, run by what was then the New York State Department of Correctional Services. The prison had a capacity of 931 male inmates. The facility is currently a film set often used for prison scenes.

The prison property bordered Arthur Kill, a waterway that separates Staten Island from New Jersey. The 260-acre (1.1 km^{2}) Clay Pit Ponds State Park Preserve is located just south of the prison site. Part of its site contains buried truck trailers and is potentially contaminated; the decision was made to "deal" with the abandoned trailers' contents in this way.

== History ==
Opened in 1976, the site formerly served as a 650-bed drug rehabilitation center, with an indoor swimming pool (closed when it became a prison); the housing of that unit was destroyed by fire. Sixteen housing (dormitory) units, the medical building, and the SHU or Special Housing Unit were built just before or while it was a prison. In the summer of 2006, the Arthur Kill Correctional Facility was used to shoot scenes for the juvenile detention center shown in the film Tenderness.

Arthur Kill housed a call center of the New York State Department of Motor Vehicles. They answered questions about regulations, but had no access to the Department's databases. When the prison closed it was to be moved to Greene.

The facility was closed in 2011 as part of Governor Andrew Cuomo's prison closing program. At the time, the prison had 408 employees, including 315 security employees. Because of dropping prison population, due to revised sentencing guidelines, some prisons were to be closed. Upstate lawmakers were adamant that it should not be just upstate prisons. The other prisons closed in 2011—Buffalo, Fulton, Mid-Orange, Mt. McGregor, Oneida, and Summit—were all upstate.

Following the prison's closure, Broadway Stages, which already operated sound stages elsewhere in the city, negotiated with New York State to purchase the prison property for use in films and productions needing "real" prison experiences. In May 2017, Broadway Stages announced it was filming the upcoming Ocean's 8 project at the facility. In addition, the 2018 and 2019, the sixth and seventh seasons of Orange Is the New Black were filmed at the facility.

== Notable inmates ==
- Paul Bateson, murderer who appeared in the film The Exorcist
