= Moriah Shock Incarceration Correctional Facility =

State prison located in New York, US

Coordinates: 44°06′25″N 73°31′59″W

- Interactive map of Moriah Shock Incarceration Correctional Facility
- Location: 75 Burhart Lane Mineville, New York
- Status: closed
- Security class: minimum / mixed
- Capacity: 300
- Opened: 1989
- Closed: March 10, 2022
- Managed by: New York State Department of Corrections and Community Supervision

Moriah Shock Incarceration Correctional Facility was a minimum security New York State prison, located in Mineville, Town of Moriah, Essex County, New York, in a remote part of the Adirondack Mountains. The facility — established in former mine buildings —was home to SHOCK and intensive ASAT programs. It usually housed about 300 inmates.
