= Riverview Correctional Facility =

Medium-security state prison for male prisoners, located in New York, US

Coordinates: 44°43′03″N 75°26′15″W

- Interactive map of Riverview Correctional Facility
- Location: 1110 Tibbitts Drive Ogdensburg, New York
- Status: open
- Security class: medium
- Capacity: 882
- Opened: 1988
- Managed by: New York State Department of Corrections and Community Supervision

Riverview Correctional Facility is a medium-security state prison for men in Ogdensburg, St. Lawrence County, New York, owned and operated by the New York State Department of Corrections and Community Supervision.

Riverview was first opened as a 700-capacity prison in 1988, one of two upstate facilities funded by New York City to house its prisoners, in a special deal between the city and state. Together with Cape Vincent Correctional Facility the construction cost was $90 million. The two were "almost identical" to each other and to the state facilities at Bare Hill and Franklin, built in the same years.

Ownership of both facilities was expected to revert to the state after seven years of operation. As of 2010 Riverview had a working capacity of 882.
