= 1979 New York prison guards' strike =

- Date: April 18 – May 5, 1979
- Location: New York state prisons
- Caused by: Dissatisfaction with negotiated contract; Resentment related to prison reform in the 1970s
- Methods: Strike action; Work stoppage; Picketing
- Result: State of NY prevailing

Parties
AFSCME Council 82	Government of the State of New York

The 1979 New York prison guards' strike began on April 18 and ended on May 5. Nearly all of the guards at New York's state prisons went on strike. Governor Hugh Carey activated the New York National Guard to staff the prisons. At the time this was the largest strike by prison guards, and among the largest deployments of a state National Guard. Like the 1968 New York City teachers' strike, this strike was a significant challenge to New York's Taylor Law, which bars public employees from striking and imposes fines.

== Background ==
At the time of the strike there were around 7,000 guards at state prisons, and 21,000 prisoners. Prison guards in New York were represented by the American Federation of State, County and Municipal Employees (AFSCME). The union had reached a tentative agreement with the state on April 5, calling for a 7 percent increase in the first year and a "wage reopener" in the second. Union members found this insufficient and urged the union to reject it, which they did on April 13. The state sought to remain within president Jimmy Carter's anti-inflation guidelines, and stated that reopening negotiations would jeopardize other pending labor agreements, specifically with the Civil Service Employees Association.

Throughout the 1970s, prisons were subject to widespread changes. The shift from prison guard to correctional officer was disliked by many guards. The McKay Commission report that followed the 1971 Attica Prison riot characterized guards as racist and ill-trained, and recommended sweeping reform. Improvements in prison conditions and court cases weakening the power of guards reduced their standing and authority. Some guards complained of being reduced to figureheads, or compared prison to a summer camp. Increasing numbers of Black and Hispanic guards were also a source of conflict. The union had said that guards' jobs were becoming more dangerous, pointing to overcrowding and other problems.

== Strike ==
The union's demands included:

- wage increases,
- replacement of the existing perk system,
- maintenance of clauses regarding seniority and workers' compensation,
- leave for union business, and
- no reprisals due to the strike aside from those in the Taylor Law.

Guards went on strike starting the evening of April 18. Guards at the state psychiatric hospitals in Manhattan, Marcy, and Middletown also walked out in support, and building guards at the State Capitol also picketed. Around 8,200 state employees went on strike in total, including civilian prison workers and workers from other departments within the same bargaining unit.

Talks began on April 20, under a news blackout agreed on by both parties. The state claimed that these talks were not a renegotiation, but instead an opportunity to clear up the union's misunderstanding of the existing agreement. The next day the union requested intervention by the Federal Mediation and Conciliation Service (FMCS). The state Public Employment Relations Board asserted that FMCS could only assist at the board's invitation. The union proposed performing the negotiations in view of the media, which was met with derision by the state.

Shortly after the strike began, a state judge issued a temporary restraining order that required the strikers to return to work. On April 26, that judge ruled that the union and its head had acted in contempt of court, although its treasurer had not. On the 27th the union was fined $450,000, more than twice the fine against the teachers' union in the 1968 strike, and the union head was fined $250. The judge said he would reduce the fine if the union returned to work the next day, but that the union head would face 30 days of jail if they did not. The next day, the union remained on strike and the union head voluntarily surrendered himself for jail, accompanied by a throng of strikers and union officials. At the Albany County Jail, he was guarded by members of his union who, working for a county jail rather than a state prison, were not on strike. The union head appointed a representative in his stead. He was released on the 5th, when the strike ended.

The National Guard entered prisons on April 20, with local law enforcement serving as backup. Law enforcement also monitored pickets and sometimes arrested strikers. 12,000 troops were activated over the strike. The strike was violent, with The New York Times reporting hostility by the strikers towards the National Guard. Picketers threw rocks and bottles at National Guard and state police vehicles, broke windshields, slashed tires, scratched paint, and tore off rear-view mirrors. Later, six picketers were arrested at Clinton Correctional Facility for throwing rocks at a fuel truck, and two guards were arrested for allegedly trying to shut off the water supply to Arthur Kill Correctional Facility. Reportedly, violence increased as the strike continued, and the family of non-striking guards received threats. A National Guard battalion officer at Elmira said the troops received injuries from the picketers every night. Union representatives disavowed the violence, and accused National Guard troops of selling drugs to prisoners, treating inmates like animals, and of making violent attacks on picketers.

The evening of April 23, a group of 25 strikers surrounded a convoy of 60 unarmed National Guard troops as they were returning from Arthur Kill in Staten Island. As the troops waited at the gates of the Staten Island Armory, the strikers dragged drivers from their vehicles at gunpoint. An unarmed reaction force from the armory then surrounded the strikers and troops. When police arrived, they persuaded the strikers to leave, without charging them. The strikers claimed that one of the trucks had swerved to hit them while leaving Arthur Kill, while the commanding National Guard officer said no such traffic incident had happened and that some of the strikers were drunk. The next day, the state revoked the right to carry firearms for striking guards.

The remaining guards and civilian staff worked long hours. The patience of local law enforcement wore thin: the village of Ossining threatened to pull police from Ossining Correctional Facility if they were not relieved by another agency. Prisoners who would normally be transferred to a state prison instead backed up in New York City jails. Despite mostly staying on lockdown during the strike, prisoners said they preferred the National Guard to the prison guards, and described the National Guard as "interested and kind."

Bargaining began in earnest on the 28th. The new agreement spanned three years, replaced the "wage opener" with cost-of-living increases, and introduced a training stipend for guards. An agreement was reached on May 4, reportedly with the intervention of AFSCME president Jerry Wurf. It included provisions to prohibit retaliation by the state against strikers in employment, but not a reduction of the accumulated Taylor Law fines, arguing it was the courts' responsibility. The union voted to ratify the agreement that night, although guards from Arthur Kill, Elmira, and a few other prisons voted against it and briefly resumed picketing. The National Guard withdrew on the 6th, ahead of schedule, to avoid confrontation with the returning guards. The cost of their deployment was estimated at more than $825 million. Although prisoners feared retribution from the returning guards, incidents of brutality remained around pre-strike levels.

== Aftermath ==
An article in Industrial and Labor Relations Review two years later said that the strike was a failure "by any objective standard", and that the terms agreed to at the end of the strike were essentially the same as those at the start. Another concurred that the contract had not improved much for the guards, and they were even more resentful after the strike. The union attempted to have the Taylor Law fines dismissed in court, without success. Tension persisted between guards who struck and those who remained, as well as civilian employees and prison administrators. A year after the strike, one local union leader still refused to speak to the scabs who had not joined the picket line.

State prison guards in New York would not strike again until the 2025 New York corrections officers' strike.
