= Monterey Shock Incarceration Correctional Facility =

Prison in New York

Coordinates: 42°20′14″N 77°01′02″W

Monterey Shock Incarceration Correctional Facility was a minimum security male shock facility located in the Town of Orange, Schuyler County, New York. The facility was served by the Beaver Dams post office. It was opened on May 1, 1958. New York's shock program was legalized in July 1987. Although it featured military-style discipline, reduced privileges, in-your-face drill instructors and hard physical labor, the six-month shock program differed from other similar "boot camps" around the nation. It would stress education, drug and alcohol abuse treatment and a "therapeutic community" component. At first, inmates could be no older than 23 years old, but the New York State Legislature gradually extended shock programs to older inmates. By closing, inmates were required to be under 50 years old. The facility was closed on July 27, 2014, as part of Governor Cuomo's plan to shut down four correctional facilities across the state announced one year prior. The Cuomo administration cited a reduction in the state crime rate and drug offenses as a reason for the closure.
