= Mohawk Correctional Facility =

State prison for men located in New York, US

Coordinates: 43°11′04″N 75°29′02″W

- Interactive map of Mohawk Correctional Facility
- Location: 6514 New York 26 Rome, New York
- Status: Operational
- Security class: Mixed
- Capacity: 1167
- Opened: 1989
- Managed by: New York State Department of Corrections and Community Supervision

Mohawk Correctional Facility is a prison for men in Rome, Oneida County, New York, US, owned and operated by the New York State Department of Corrections and Community Supervision. The facility is classified as medium security but also has a maximum security medical unit and a special housing unit. Mohawk opened as a prison in 1989. As of September 2023, the facility held 1,141 inmates.

== History ==
Like Mid-State Correctional Facility nearby, Mohawk was converted to a prison from a psychiatric institution. Originally it was the Oneida County Poorhouse, founded in 1827. It became "The New York State Custodial Asylum for Un-Teachable Idiots" in 1893, changing its scope to "unteachable mental defectives", and taking some patients from the New York State Asylum for Idiots in Syracuse. It was later known as the Oneida State Custodial Asylum and Rome State Custodial Asylum, and was the Rome Developmental Center at its closing in October of 1989. One half of the site became Mohawk, while the other half became Oneida Correctional Facility, which closed in 2011.

Serial kidnapper and rapist John Jamelske was housed at the medical unit within Mohawk. Harvey Weinstein was an inmate for about a year until his release in April 2024.
