= ParoleWatch =

- Founded: 1997
- Website: ParoleWatch.org
- Current status: Defunct

ParoleWatch was a privately-run website started in 1997 that provided public access to data on convicted felons in New York State who were coming up for parole review. The project's aim was to let citizens "communicate their views on would-be parolees to the New York State Parole Board."

== History ==
"ParoleWatch will not be the first such site" with information on potential parolees, The New York Times reported in April 1997. "For almost a year, the New Jersey State Parole Board has published on the Web a list of inmates eligible for parole. But ParoleWatch might well be the first parole Web site published by a private organization." In an article for the KlaasKids Foundation, ParoleWatch's founder predicted that "Eventually people in every state will be just a few mouse-clicks away from this kind of data."

ParoleWatch was organized by the anti-crime group Take Back New York, and grew out of the group's grass-roots efforts to block the parole of a convicted murderer. The New York State Department of Correctional Services provided the data for ParoleWatch.

The New York Times wrote that the project had "prominent supporters." New York divorce lawyer Raoul Felder served as chairman of ParoleWatch's advisory board, "which also includes several well-known victims' rights advocates."

Felder told The Times "he backed the project because too often victims receive no notification when offenders are up for parole. 'There is a blank spot in the criminal justice system,' Felder said. 'We put these guys away. They get out and the victims usually have no way of knowing when they get out.' ParoleWatch, he said, 'gives them a fair shot.'

According to the New York Post, one effect of ParoleWatch was to turn parole reform into a national issue.

== Criticism ==
In his book, The Control Revolution: How the Internet is Putting Individuals in Charge and Changing the World We Know, Andrew L. Shapiro said that ParoleWatch "demonstrates much of what is possible when it comes to individuals using interactive technology to transform politics—and what might go wrong. ... ParoleWatch does a real public service by giving citizens access to data about violent offenders and their release dates." But it prompted "people to 'take action'...based on a very limited view of each case."

The American Civil Liberties Union had voiced similar criticisms when ParoleWatch was launched. In an interview with Wired, Take Back New York Executive Director Joe Diamond responded to the ACLU's objections by "conced[ing] that Parolewatch 'is not overly concerned with the prisoner's point of view.'"

Shapiro wrote that, as a victims' rights organization, ParoleWatch was "fully entitled to express its views on crime and safety" and that law-and-order advocates have always "had the ability to lobby parole boards." In Shapiro's view, however, there was a danger "in ParoleWatch's sophisticated harnessing of new technology. It uses the pinpoint accuracy of a computer database to match citizens in certain neighborhoods with felons who might be released there, and it relies on the Net's interactivity to give folks a free and easy way to voice their opposition—without having to take time to become well informed, let alone to hear the views of others."

Some of the criticism of ParoleWatch was more tongue-in-cheek. "A better name for the Web site address is www.rotinjail.com," said activist attorney Ron Kuby.

== See also ==
- Megan's Law
