= Adirondack Correctional Facility =

State prison in New York, U.S.

Coordinates: 44°17′25″N 74°05′30″W

- Interactive map of Adirondack Correctional Facility
- Location: 196 Old Ray Brook Road Ray Brook, New York
- Status: Operational
- Security class: Medium
- Capacity: 566
- Opened: 1904; prison since 1971
- Managed by: New York State Department of Corrections and Community Supervision

The Adirondack Correctional Facility is a medium-security prison in Ray Brook, New York, in the Adirondack Mountains between Saranac Lake and Lake Placid; it detains up to 566 people.

== History ==
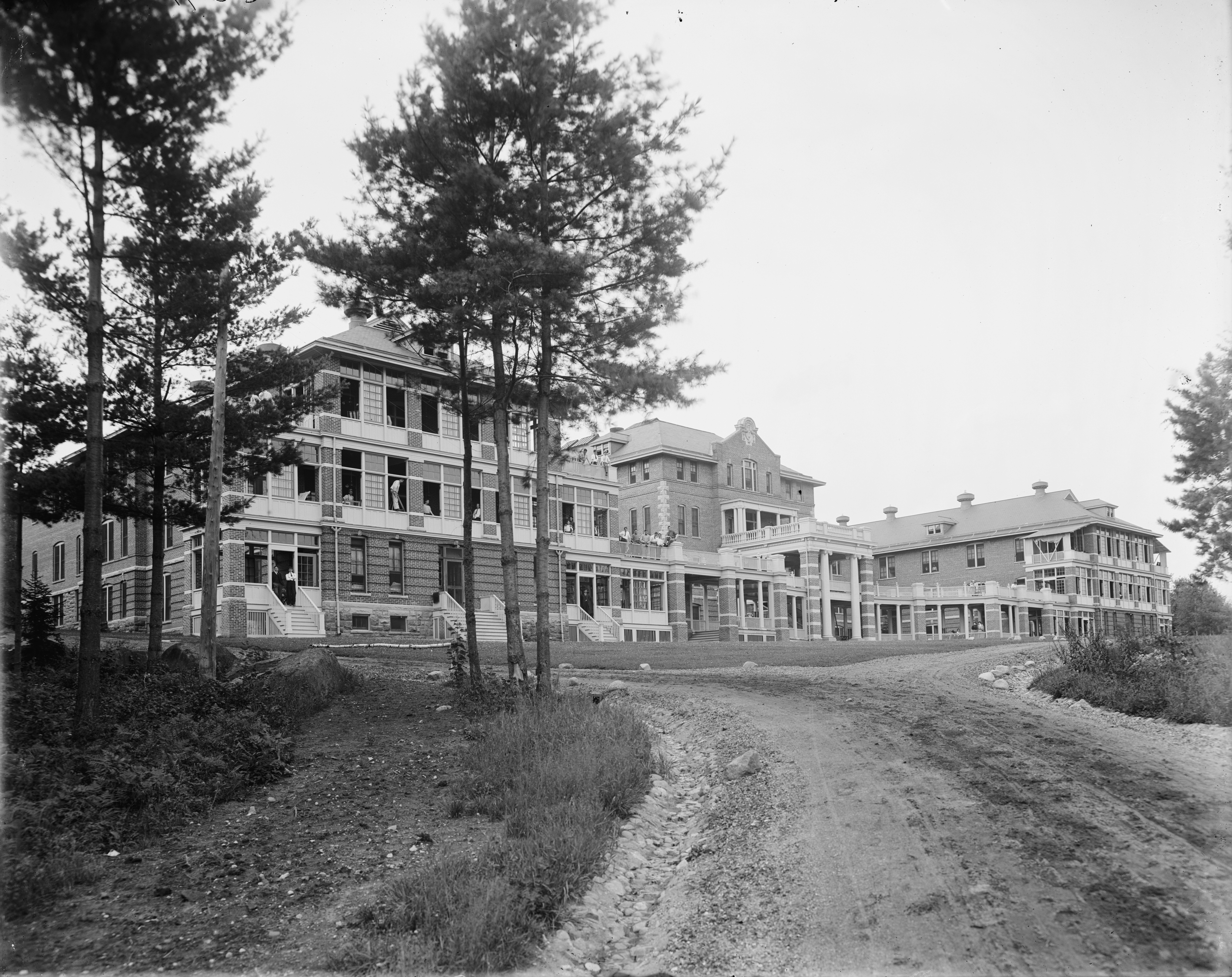
Construction of the State Sanatorium at Ray Brook, sometime between 1905 and 1920

Adirondack Correctional Facility started as the Ray Brook Sanatorium, the first state-operated tuberculosis sanatorium, starting in 1904. Although medical developments made sanitoria obsolete starting in the mid-1950s, the State Sanatorium at Ray Brook continued to operate until the mid-1960s. The property was transferred from the Department of Health to the new Drug Addiction Control Commission, combining enforcement and treatment; in 1971 the new facility opened as the Ray Brook Rehabilitation Center, housing 70 to 130 female people with substance abuse disorders. However, it was judged a failure, and closed within five years. It was succeeded by a camp program for adult inmates, "Camp Adirondack". Working with the Department of Environmental Conservation, "campmen", as inmates were known, were employed in logging, sawmill, wildlife preservation, construction of campsites and snowmobile and cross-country ski trails, and construction of a toboggan run at the Mount Pisgah ski area. The camp also constructed the Ice Palace each winter for the Saranac Lake Winter Carnival.

With the selection of Lake Placid for the 1980 Winter Olympics the inmates worked on the Olympic trails at Mount Van Hoevenburg. The camp facilities were used for Olympic staff housing, which led to renovation of the water treatment plant, sewage system, housing and food service areas. During the games, the inmates were relocated to other prison facilities in the state, and were replaced by 900 State Police and 300 U.S. Customs Bureau personnel, National Guard and security forces of foreign governments who provided security for the Games. An area of 200 acres (81 ha) of the facility was used as the site for the Olympic Village; after the games it became a new federal prison, the Federal Correctional Institution, Ray Brook.

The newly improved facilities allowed a substantial increase in the prison population, which led to the erection of the first security fence around the perimeter of the complex. In 1981, Camp Adirondack was designated a medium-security facility and renamed the Adirondack Correctional Facility. As of 2010 Adirondack had a working capacity of 566.

== Literary connections ==
Sylvia Plath's college boyfriend, Dick Norton (Buddy, of The Bell Jar) contracted tuberculosis while at Harvard University, and was sent to Ray Brook for treatment. Plath visited him in 1952, and broke her leg while skiing on Mount Pisgah in nearby Saranac Lake. Andrea Barrett's 2007 novel The Air We Breathe is based on a fictionalized Ray Brook Sanatorium.
