= Bare Hill Correctional Facility =

Medium security state prison in Franklin County, New York

Coordinates: 44°52′43″N 74°19′26″W

- Interactive map of Bare Hill Correctional Facility
- Location: 181 Brand Road Malone, New York
- Status: Closed
- Security class: Medium
- Capacity: 1722
- Opened: 1988
- Closed: March 11, 2026
- Managed by: New York State Department of Corrections and Community Supervision

Bare Hill Correctional Facility was a medium security state prison in Malone, Franklin County, New York, United States.

Bare Hill C.F. was located by Franklin Correctional Facility, a medium security prison and Upstate Correctional Facility, a maximum security prison.

The prison opened in 1988, and as of 2010 had a working capacity of 1722.

Among the programs offered to the inmates is participation in social programs to aid residents of the region. Almost every prisoner has a work assignment, either within or outside the prison.

In 2025, the US National Guard came to assist the understaffed facility amid protests by staff, who demanded safer working conditions. On November 18, 2025, Governor Kathy Hochul ordered the prison to be shut down on March 11, 2026 amid struggles with low staffing.

The prison closed on March 11, 2026.

== Notable inmates ==
- Richard Delage - serving a life term for shooting and killing a schoolteacher in Mount Kisco in 1960. At the time of the crime, he was only 15 years old. Moved to Wyoming Correctional Facility following the prison's closure.
