= Buffalo Correctional Facility =

Former prison in New York, United States

- Interactive map of Buffalo Correctional Facility
- Location: Alden, New York; 42.931°N 78.542°W
- Status: Closed
- Population: 109 (12/30/2005)
- Managed by: New York Department of Correctional Services

The Buffalo Correctional Facility was a minimum security prison for males in New York, United States. The prison was located in town of Alden, east of the Buffalo, adjacent to the Wende Correctional Facility. As of 2012, the facility has been closed by the New York State Department of Corrections and Community Supervision.
