= Franklin Correctional Facility =

Medium security state prison in New York, US

Coordinates: 44°52′08″N 74°18′49″W

- Interactive map of Franklin Correctional Facility
- Location: Town of Malone, New York
- Status: open
- Security class: medium
- Capacity: 1730
- Opened: 1986
- Managed by: New York State Department of Corrections and Community Supervision

Franklin Correctional Facility is a medium security state prison in the Town of Malone, Franklin County, New York, United States, near Bare Hill Correctional Facility and Upstate Correctional Facility, medium and maximum security prisons, respectively. It has a capacity for 1730 inmates.

Franklin Correctional Facility opened in 1986.
