= New York State Department of Corrections and Community Supervision =

Agency in the US state of New York

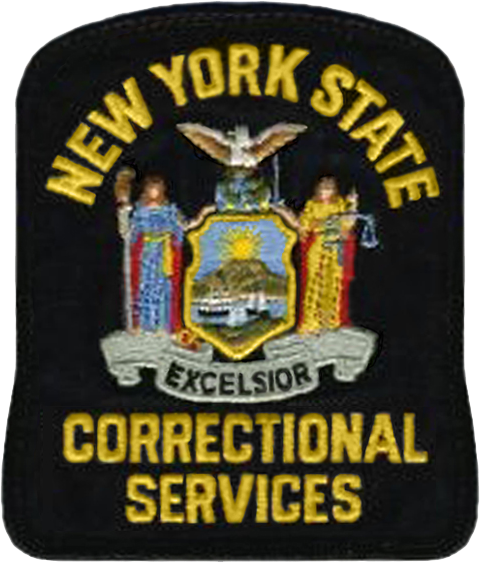
- Patch

- Seal

- Logo
- Abbreviation: NYSDOCCS

Agency overview
- Preceding agencies: NYS Board of Prisons; NYS Division of Parole (absorbed 2011)
- Employees: 26,400

Jurisdictional structure
- Operations jurisdiction: New York, United States
- General nature: Civilian police

Operational structure
- Headquarters: Albany, New York
- Sworn members: 15,200
- Agency executive: Daniel F. Martuscello III, Commissioner

Facilities
- Prisons: 41

Website
- doccs.ny.gov
- Former name: NYS Dept. of Correctional Services (1971–2011)

The New York State Department of Corrections and Community Supervision (NYSDOCCS) is the department of the New York State government that administers the state prison and parole system, including 41 prisons funded by the state government.

New York State currently incarcerates approximately 32,600 people (up 4% from a year before) and supervises approximately 25,100 parolees (down 8% from a year before) at seven regional offices as of 2023. The department employs a staff of approximately 26,400 individuals as of March 2023, including approximately 15,200 uniformed correction officers. Its regulations are compiled in title 7 of the New York Codes, Rules and Regulations. NYS DOCCS states that it is "responsible for the care, custody, and treatment" of the people held in the state prisons.

In response to falling crime rates and declining prison populations in New York State, the department has closed many facilities since 2009. Between 2011 and 2022 nearly 20 prisons were closed, with plans for additional facility closures based on the continued decline in the number of incarcerated individuals in the state. On April 1, 2011, the New York State Division of Parole merged with the New York State Department of Correctional Services to form the New York State Department of Corrections and Community Supervision. As of 2016, New York, per state law, did not contract with private prison corporations.

== History ==
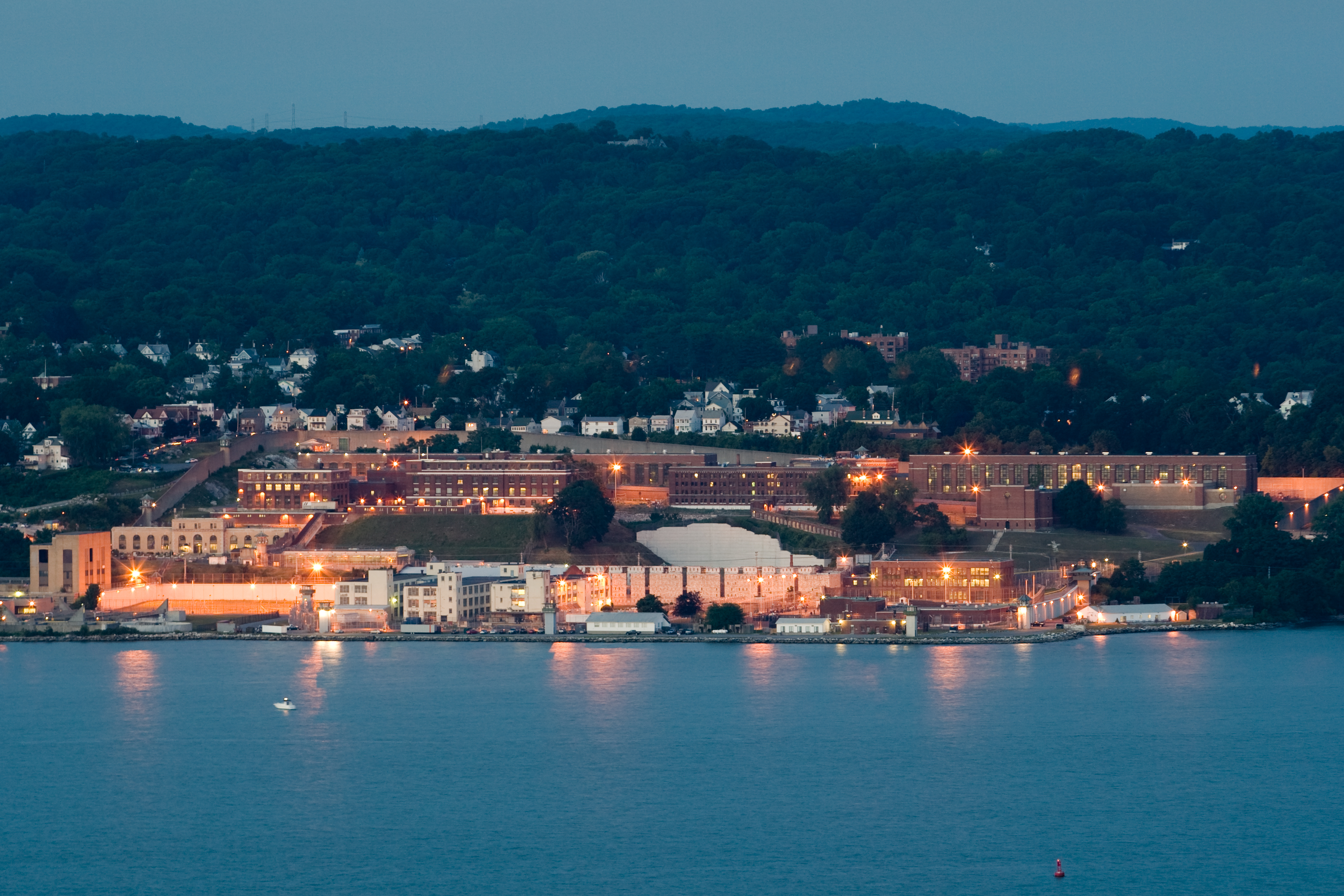
Sing Sing Correctional Facility

The New York State prison system had its beginnings in 1797 with a single prison called Newgate located in New York City. A second state prison opened 20 years later in Auburn in 1817, and in 1825 a group of Auburn prisoners made the voyage across the Erie Canal and down the Hudson River to begin building Sing Sing in the village of Ossining, New York.

Historians have not described the prison system of New York State in the 19th century in a favorable light - with employment positions being awarded based on the spoils system, employees being characterized as largely corrupt, and the use of prisoners to gain favorable manufacturing contracts.

The state commissioned architect Alfred Hopkins to design three major institutions built between 1933 and 1935: Wallkill Correctional Facility, Woodbourne Correctional Facility and Coxsackie Correctional Facility. All three were designed on progressive principles, reflected a concern for aesthetics and a sense of place, and had no surrounding walls or fences. That has changed.

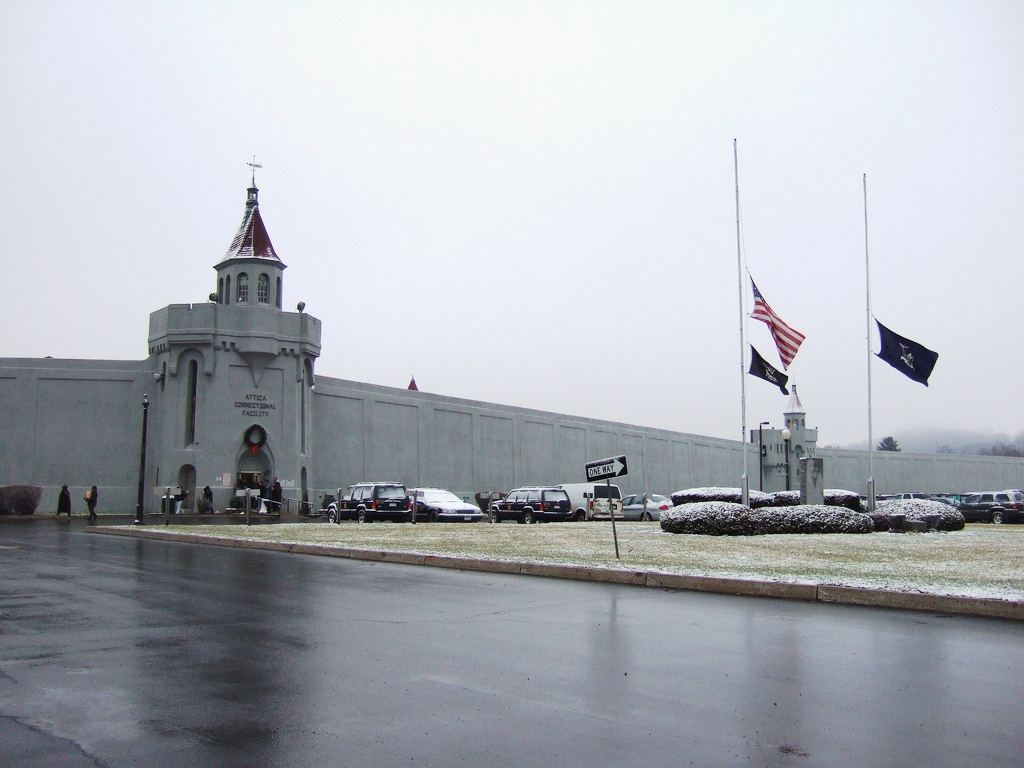
Attica Correctional Facility

Between its founding and the year 1973, New York had operated only 18 prisons. After the new focus on prison administration brought by the Attica Prison riot in September 1971, and a new influx of prisoners created by the new stricter Rockefeller Drug Laws starting in 1973, the corrections system was forced to expand dramatically. Corrections acquired a number of older state-owned properties from other agencies during the 1970s, some with expansive acreage and Edwardian structures, such as the Adirondack Correctional Facility in 1971 (originally the Ray Brook Sanatorium, founded in 1904) the Otisville Correctional Facility in 1976 (on the grounds of a former tuberculosis sanitarium founded in 1906), and the Mount McGregor Correctional Facility in 1976 (with a varied history since its opening in 1913, operated from 1969 through 1976 as the Wilton State School by the New York State Department of Mental Hygiene).

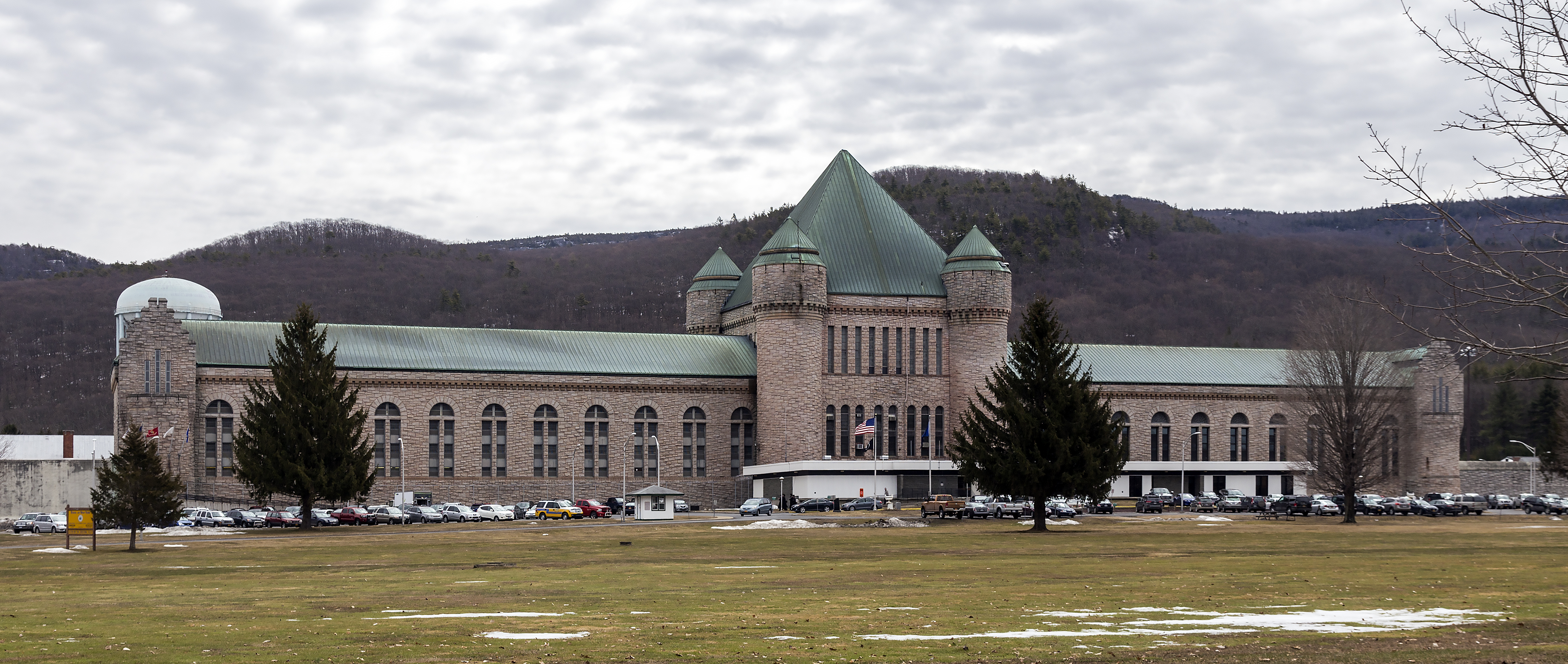
Eastern Correctional Facility

The growth continued in another way through the 1980s. A huge prison construction initiative took the form of "cookie-cutter" facilities, fifteen different medium-security installations such as Washington Correctional Facility in 1985, built with the same blueprints, the same dorms and mess halls, as Franklin, Mohawk, Bare Hill, etc. Many of the 15 opened in 1988. Two of these, Riverview and Cape Vincent, were initially funded and owned by New York City to shuttle city prisoners by air, as a way to address the city's jail overpopulation crisis.

== Demographics ==
=== Population size ===
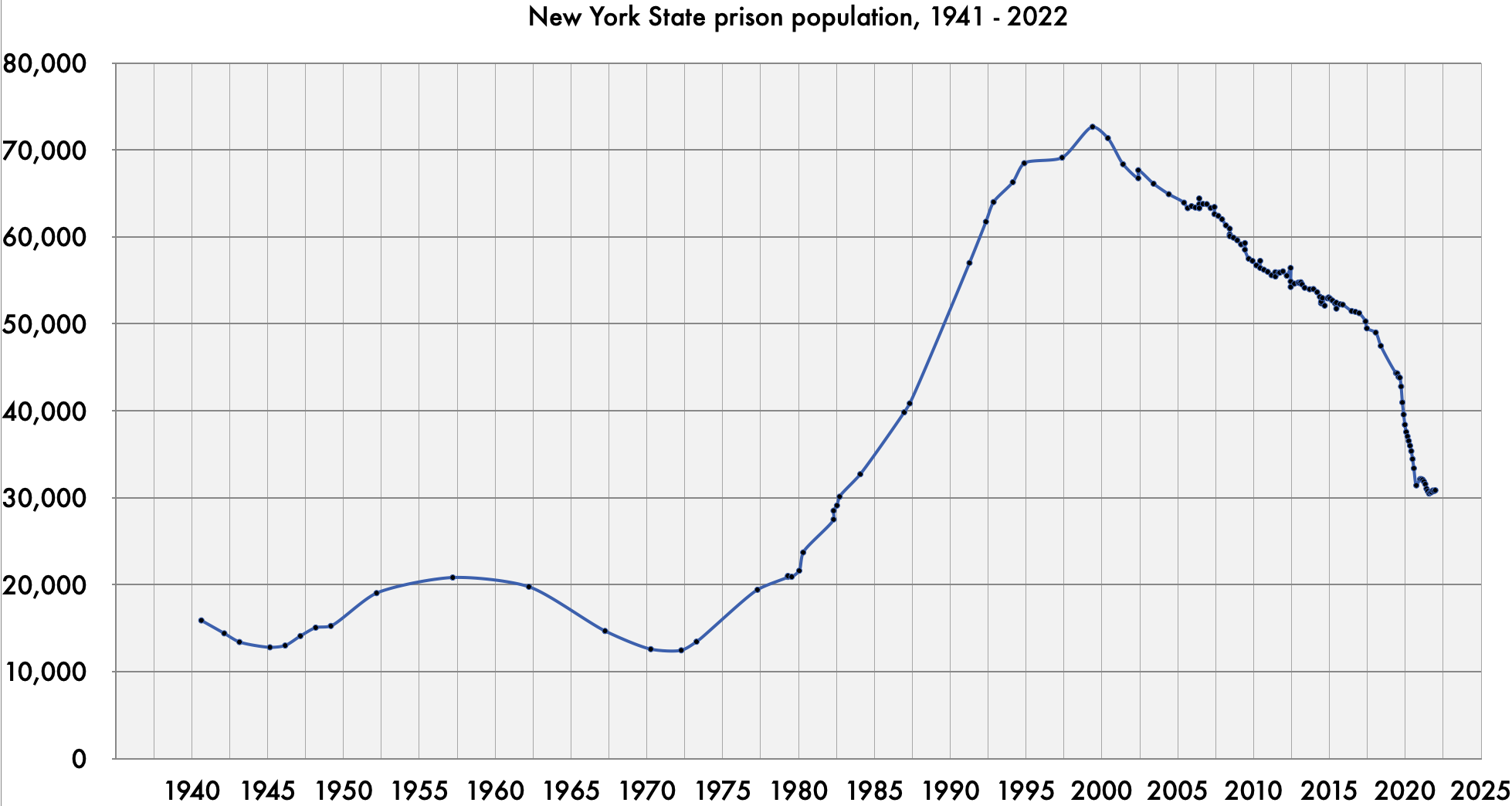
New York State prison population, 1941-2022

The incarcerated population in New York State grew rapidly from the 1970's-1990's, in line with the pattern of mass incarceration across the United States. This trend reversed during the first two decades of the 21st century. From its peak in 1999 at nearly 73,000 individuals, the total state prison population declined by over 50 percent to 32,600 as of December 2023. Although the total prison population has declined in recent years, the proportion of prisoners over age 50 has increased greatly. Rapidly declining numbers of inmates have led to prison closures and pressure to consolidate further. In some rural communities, this has meant a significant loss of jobs. But the number of prison officers employed by the department has declined much more slowly than the number of incarcerated people in the state, by 17% since 1999 as compared to the 57% decline in incarcerated individuals through April 2021. For every officer employed by the state prison system, there were 1.7 incarcerated people as of 2021, far below the 1999 ratio of 3.3 to 1. By comparison, the US Federal Bureau of Prisons currently has an inmate-to-officer ratio of 7.5 to 1.

=== Gender distribution ===
Men account for about 95% of people in New York State prisons. Of the forty-four total facilities, three are designated as women's prisons: Albion, Bedford Hills, and Taconic Correctional Facility. DOCCS does not publish statistics on gender diversity other than by facility designation as "male" and "female," so the proportion who are transgender or non-binary is not known. Reports required by the Prison Rape Elimination Act, however, show that many prisons have small numbers of trans/nonbinary people among the population.

Recently, NYS DOCCS has revised policies to reflect transgender and nonbinary people's gender identities. In January 2022, New York Governor Kathy Hochul directed the prison administrators to let transgender people choose to be housed in a men's or women's facility, and to give access to appropriate medical and mental health care. In 2019, DOCCS granted the first transfer for a transgender woman to move from a men's to a women's prison prior to gender-reassignment surgery. Since then, the departments states that it has granted "a number of gender-aligned placements ... including transfers of transgender women from male to female facilities" and one transfer of "a transgender man from a female to a male facility." Incarcerated transgender people have access to clothing and sanitary supplies based on gender identity, and to request that pat frisks be conducted by an officer of the gender that individual prefers (honored by DOCCS "when possible"), regardless of the gender designation of the prison.

=== Race/ethnicity ===
As is true in the United States generally, New York incarcerates people at different rates when examined using gender and racial/ethnic categories. As of 2018, according to the U.S. Census Bureau's categorization system, about 48% of incarcerated individuals were Black or African American; 25% White; 25% Hispanic; and a small number belonging to other categories. In contrast, the largest group in the overall state population is non-Hispanic White. Thus, Black and Latin/Hispanic men are disproportionately likely to be incarcerated in the state.

=== Age distribution ===
The population of New York State's prison system is aging, as is the population of New York State and of the United States overall. The average age of incarcerated people in the New York State prison system is 40 years old as of 2021, up from 36 years old in 2008. The proportion of incarcerated people over age 50 in NYS DOCCS facilities is nearly 25% as of 2021, double the proportion in 2008.

There are a number of causes of the shift towards an older population. These include legislation that prohibits sending children under 18 years old to adult prisons (Raise the Age law); declining rates of new incarcerations (which typically are among younger segments of the population); and population aging in the state, nationally, and globally. Another factor is the Rockefeller drug law reforms of 2009, which contributed to "significant declines in felony drug arrests, indictments on felony drug charges and prison commitments for felony drug crimes from 2010 through 2019." The reforms amended the mandatory sentencing laws that had been in place for drug-related crimes since 1973.

== State prison system characteristics ==
See main List of New York state prisons

Locations of state correctional facilities within New York

As of 2022, New York State maintains forty-four state prisons, down from sixty-eight in 2011. By design, inmates are moved with some frequency between prisons, based on the belief that inmate–staff friendships that might lead, for example, to drug smuggling by staff.

In part as a response to the Attica Prison uprising of 1971, a number of measures were taken to avoid future confrontations and reduce tensions between guards and prisoners. All New York State correctional facilities have monthly meetings between elected prisoner representatives and the prison administration, at which prisoners may present their concerns. A grievance process was instituted, by which prisoners may grieve any employee whom they feel is acting in violation of regulations. Other prison uprisings occurred across the country during the 1970s, spurred by poor prison conditions and demanding reforms.

At Bedford Hills Correctional Facility, a maximum security women's prison, the August Rebellion led to greater protection of the rights of incarcerated people in the United States. Following the prison riot the women filed and won the class-action lawsuit Powell v. Ward. The lawsuit ended in a legally binding pledge by prison guards to conduct disciplinary proceedings fairly and to only send truly mentally ill prisoners to psychiatric hospitals.

=== Facilities and communication policies ===
Prisons are required to have law libraries, and most prisons have a general library, with a professional librarian. Incarcerated people usually have a limited amount of time to be outdoors (in "the yard"). Incarcerated people have access to telephones, which requires recording and monitoring of calls, and some email access. Calls and emails can only be made out to pre-approved numbers and addresses. A prisoner lawsuit about 2010 dramatically reduced the very high charges per minute by the telephone service provider. New York has instituted a package policy, effective August 15, 2022, that allows incarcerated people to receive only two personally boxed packages per year from friends or family. All other packages— e.g., clothes, packaged foods, and other allowable items— must be purchased and shipped directly from vendors (such as Amazon). Inmates are allowed three packages per month, based on the date they arrive at the facility (i.e., a package ordered January 31 that arrives in February will count towards February's package log). The policy prohibits visitors from bringing gifts of any kind to the prison, whereas visitors were allowed to bring gifts and drop them off at the package room in the past.

Prisons generally have on their staff a chaplain, and a rabbi and imam, who usually visit several different prisons on different days of the week. At some medium-security prisons, facilities for conjugal visits are available for carefully selected inmates, including same-sex married couples. New York State is one of only four states with conjugal visits in 2014. They typically take place in trailers within the prison grounds, and some spouses bring children along, so sex offenders are not eligible for conjugal visits.

=== Work assignments ===
Each Incarcerated Individual is assigned a staff member (Offender Rehabilitation Coordinator) who assists inmates in navigating the complicated institutional and external program rules. In addition to checking each inmate's telephone and email lists, the advisor assigns each inmate a job, which is typically paid at well under 50¢. Typically there are more inmate workers than work to do, but policy is that every inmate in "population"—the main class of inmates, without special conditions—must have a job. Incarcerated people generally either work running or maintaining the facility, or work for "prison industries." Facility jobs pay 10-26¢ per hour (from 60¢ to $1.56 per day), as of data from 2017.

=== Death row ===
Prior to the 2007 repeal of the death penalty, the male death row was at the Clinton Correctional Facility and the female death row was at the Bedford Hills Correctional Facility. The execution chamber was located at the Green Haven Correctional Facility. Previously, inmates had been executed at the Sing Sing Correctional Facility.

Capital punishment was banned following the U.S. Supreme Court's ruling declaring existing capital punishment statutes unconstitutional in Furman v. Georgia (1972), but was reinstated in New York in 1995 when Governor George Pataki signed a new statute into law, which provided for execution by lethal injection. On June 24, 2004, in the case People v. LaValle, the New York Court of Appeals struck down the statute as unconstitutional under the New York Constitution (at the time, only two individuals were under a sentence of death). Although seven individuals were sentenced to death, no one was executed, and the Court of Appeals later commuted the sentence of the final individual under a sentence of death in New York on October 23, 2007, in the case People v. John Taylor. In July 2008, Governor David Paterson ordered the removal of all execution equipment used to perform lethal injection and the closure of the execution chamber at the Green Haven Correctional Facility.

== COVID-19 response ==
DOCCS reports that 45 incarcerated individuals have died of COVID-19, as well as 18 DOCCS staff members and 9 people on parole (a more difficult number for the department to track). The department reported 11,270 positive cases among incarcerated people and over 14,000 cases among staff as of October, 2022, but due to lack of testing availability, especially early in the pandemic, these are underestimates of the true number of cases.

Visiting at New York State prisons was completely suspended during the first months of the COVID-19 pandemic, from March to August, 2020. After reopening in August, DOCCS imposed more restrictions on family and others visiting the prisons, including two-hour maximum visits, a ban on physical touch, and required pre-registration. As COVID-19 cases surged in fall 2021, DOCCS imposed a requirement that visitors show proof of vaccination or a negative test result. DOCCS stated that they would provide test kits at facilities for visitors who arrived without proof of vaccination or a negative test result within the prior 48 hours.

As of December 2021, approximately 70% of DOCCS staff reported that they had been vaccinated against COVID-19, and 52% of incarcerated individuals have been partially or fully vaccinated.

== Correction Officers and Parole Officers ==
In labor negotiations, the officers are represented by the New York State Correctional Officers and Police Benevolent Association (NYSCOPBA). The union has been vocal in its opposition to prison closures. Professional, Scientific and Technical Services Unit (PS&T)- Represent Parole officers.

Since 1861, 28 New York state correction officers have died as a result of violence in the line of duty or a duty-related illness (e.g., tuberculosis). The last death by violence was in 1981. Eight others have died by accidents, heart attack or other cause while working. In the uprising at Attica in 1971, forty-three people were killed; eleven were state workers (eight guards and three civilian workers) and thirty-two incarcerated men. The majority of the deaths were caused by gunfire from law enforcement: ten state workers and twenty-nine incarcerated men were fatally shot.

Some correctional officers work in specialized units, including: Correctional Emergency Response Team (CERT); Crisis Intervention Unit (CIU); Hostage Rescue Team (HRT); Fire Brigade (NYS Facility Firefighter); Office of Special Investigations (OSI); Employee Investigation Unit (EIU); and D.O.C.C.S. K-9 Unit.

=== Power and legal authority ===
New York State Correction Officers have peace officer status statewide under Criminal Procedure Law § 2.10; this authorizes them:

- The power to make warrantless arrests pursuant to Criminal Procedure Law § 140.25
- The power to use physical force and deadly physical force in making an arrest or preventing an escape pursuant to Penal Law § 35.30
- The power to carry out warrantless searches whenever such searches are constitutionally permissible and acting pursuant to their duties, in accordance with Criminal Procedure Law § 2.20
- The power to possess and take custody of firearms not owned by the peace officer, for the purpose of disposing, guarding, or any other lawful purpose, consistent with his or her duties as a peace officer, pursuant to Criminal Procedure Law § 2.20
- The power to issue certain summonses and appearance tickets when acting pursuant to their duties, in accordance with Criminal Procedure Law § 2.20

New York State Correction Officers are also authorized by the state to carry firearms unrestricted off-duty and are thus covered under the federal Law Enforcement Officers Safety Act which allows for permit-less off-duty carry across the nation.

From highest to lowest title, the command structure for correction officers and their civilian administrators is as follows:

Title	Insignia
Commissioner	
Deputy Commissioner	
Superintendent	
Deputy Superintendent for Security/Colonel	
Captain	
Lieutenant	
Sergeant	
Correction Officer	
Correction Officer - Trainee	

=== Parole Officers ===
New York State Division of Parole are law enforcement officers within the department who aid, assist and supervise offenders released from correctional facilities to serve a period of post-release supervision. Parole Officers are responsible for providing public safety and community protection, while working with community-based organizations to deliver needed services and supervision to releasees. Parole Officers perform both social work and law enforcement functions, and work to develop a supervision plan for each releasee; they also assess and evaluate the adequacy of each releasee's community adjustment and intervene when the releasee's behavior threatens that adjustment. The parole officer, in consultation with his or her supervisor, determines when and under what circumstances delinquency action is warranted. The parole officer works to ensure that individuals released from prison by order of the Board of Parole and by statute live and remain at liberty in the community without violating the law. When a parolee or conditional releasee violates their conditions of release, the parole officer may take the subject into custody with or without a warrant, and will typically return them to the nearest correctional facility. Parole Officers are usually assigned to area field offices, which are located in many of the major cities throughout New York State. Parole Officers have peace officer status statewide pursuant to Criminal Procedure Law § 2.10.

== Controversies ==
A 2025 New York Times investigation "identified more than 120 instances in the past decade in which guards were described as having punched, kicked or stomped on prisoners, smashed their fingers in cell doors, held their legs apart and struck their genitals with batons, and even waterboarded them — all while the prisoners were handcuffed or otherwise restrained."

== Commissioners ==
- Daniel F. Martuscello III - June 2023 to May 2024 (Acting), May 2024 to present
- Anthony J. Annucci - 2013 to 2023 (Acting)
- Brian Fischer - 2007 to 2013
- Glenn S. Goord - 1996 to 2006
- Philip Coombe Jr. - 1994 to 1996
- Thomas A Coughlin - 1979 to 1994
- John A. Lyons - 1939, reappointed 1944
- Raymond Francis Charles Kieb - appointed 1927

== See also ==
- 1979 New York prison guards' strike
- 2025 New York corrections officers' strike
- Central New York Psychiatric Center
- ParoleWatch
- List of New York state prisons
- List of United States state correction agencies
- List of law enforcement agencies in New York
