= List of cemeteries in New York =

This is a list of cemeteries in New York.

== Cemeteries in New York ==
=== A ===
- Acacia Cemetery, Ozone Park, Queens
- Agudas Achim Cemetery, Livingston Manor
- Agudat Achim Cemetery, Rotterdam
- Agudath Achim Cemetery, East Setauket
- Ahavath Israel Cemetery, Liberty
- Albany Rural Cemetery, Menands (one of the oldest in New York)
- Albany Diocesan Cemeteries (Note: In 1867, St. Agnes Cemetery in Menands was founded as an independent rural cemetery for Albany Catholics. Most Holy Redeemer Cemetery was established in 1924 for the use of parishes in Schenectady that did not have their own cemeteries. St. Mary’s Cemetery in Troy, a parish cemetery established in 1844, was reorganized and incorporated in the 1940s. Albany Diocesan Cemeteries History)
- Artists Cemetery, Woodstock
- Assumption Cemetery, Syracuse

=== B ===
- Bard College Cemetery, Annadale-on-Hudson
- Baron Hirsch Cemetery, Graniteville, Staten Island
- Batavia Cemetery, Batavia
- Bayside Cemetery, Ozone Park, Queens
- Beechwoods Cemetery, New Rochelle
- Bentley Cemetery, Lakewood
- Beth David Cemetery, Elmont, Long Island
- Beth Moses Cemetery, West Babylon
- Beth El Cemetery (New Union Field), Ridgewood, Queens
- Beth Olom Cemetery, Brooklyn and Queens
- Breslau Cemetery, Lindenhurst
- Brick Church Cemetery, New Hempstead

=== C ===
- Calvary Cemetery, Woodside, Queens
- Cedar Grove Cemetery (Queens, New York), Flushing, Queens
- Cedar Hill Cemetery and Mausoleum, Newburgh
- Cedar Lawn Cemetery, East Hampton
- Cemetery of the Evergreens, Brooklyn
- Cemetery of the Holy Rood, Westbury
- Cherry Lane Cemetery, Westerleigh, Staten Island
- Chesed Shel Emes Cemetery, Liberty
- Cold Springs Cemetery, near Carlisle Gardens
- Colden Family Cemetery, in the town of Montgomery.
- Columbia Cemetery, Columbia
- Cypress Hills Cemetery, Brooklyn and Queens

=== E ===
- Elmont Cemetery, Elmont
- Evergreen Cemetery (Owego, New York)
- Evergreen Cemetery (Pine Plains, New York), Pine Plains
- Evergreen Cemetery, Wales Center

=== F ===
- Ferncliff Cemetery, Hartsdale
- Ferndale Cemetery, Johnstown
- First Shearith Israel Graveyard (Chatham Square Cemetery), Chinatown, Manhattan
- Flushing Cemetery, Queens
- Forest Hill Cemetery, Utica
- Forest Lawn Cemetery, Buffalo
- Forest Park Cemetery, Brunswick
- Fort Hill Cemetery, Auburn
- Friends Quaker Cemetery, Brooklyn

=== G ===
- Gate of Heaven Cemetery, Hawthorne
- Gerald B. H. Solomon Saratoga National Cemetery, Stillwater
- Good Ground Cemetery, Hampton Bays
- Goodleburg Cemetery, Wales
- Green River Cemetery, Springs
- Green-Wood Cemetery, Brooklyn
- Greenwood Union Cemetery, Rye
- Griffins Mills Cemetery, Griffins Mills
- Grove Cemetery, Trumansburg

=== H ===
- Holmes Hill Cemetery, South Wales
- Holy Cross Cemetery, Brooklyn
- Holy Sepulchre Cemetery, New Rochelle
- Holy Sepulchre Cemetery, Rochester
- Hungarian Union Field Cemetery, Glendale, Queens
- Huntington Rural Cemetery, Huntington
- Independent Jewish Cemetery Association, Sag Harbor
- Har shalom cemetery Airmont

=== J ===
- Jewish Association of United Brethren Cemetery, Sag Harbor

=== K ===
- Kensico Cemetery, Valhalla
- Kinderhook Reformed Church Cemetery, Kinderhook
- Kings Park Jewish Cemetery, Kings Park
- Knollwood Park Cemetery, Ridgewood, Queens

=== L ===
- Lake View Cemetery, Ithaca
- Lake View Cemetery, Interlaken
- Lake View Cemetery, Jamestown
- Lakewood Cemetery, Cooperstown
- Liberty Cemetery, Liberty
- Linden Hill Cemetery, Ridgewood, Queens
- Locust Valley Cemetery, Locust Valley
- Long Island National Cemetery, East Farmingdale
- Lutheran All Faiths Cemetery, Middle Village, Queens

=== M ===
- Machpelah Cemetery, Le Roy
- Machpelah Cemetery, Ridgewood, Queens
- Maimonides Cemetery, Cypress Hills, Brooklyn
- Maimonides Cemetery, Elmont
- Maple Grove Cemetery, Kew Gardens, Queens
- Melville Cemetery, Melville
- Middle Patent Rural Cemetery, Bedford
- Mokom Sholom Cemetery, Ozone Park, Queens
- Monfort Cemetery, Port Washington
- Montefiore Cemetery, Springfield Gardens, Queens
- Moravian Cemetery, New Dorp, Staten Island
- Mount Albion Cemetery, Albion
- Mount Ararat Cemetery, Farmingdale
- Mount Calvary Cemetery, White Plains
- Mount Carmel Cemetery, Glendale, Queens
- Mount Golda Cemetery, Huntington Station
- Mount Hebron Cemetery, Flushing, Queens
- Mount Holiness Church Cemetery, Inwood
- Mount Hope Cemetery, Cypress Hills, Brooklyn
- Mount Hope Cemetery, Rochester
- Mount Judah Cemetery, Ridgewood, Queens
- Mount Lebanon Cemetery, Ridgewood, Queens
- Mount Neboh Cemetery, Glendale, Queens
- Mount Olivet Cemetery, Maspeth, Queens
- Mount Pleasant Cemetery, Hawthorne
- Mount Richmond Cemetery, Staten Island (second cemetery of the Hebrew Free Burial Association)
- Mount St. Mary Cemetery, Flushing, Queens
- Mount Zion Cemetery, Maspeth, Queens

=== N ===
- Nassau Knolls Cemetery, Port Washington
- National September 11 Memorial & Museum, New York City
- New Montefiore Cemetery, West Babylon
- New Paltz Rural Cemetery, New Paltz
- New York Marble Cemetery, East Village, Manhattan, the oldest non-sectarian cemetery in New York City
- New York City Marble Cemetery, East Village, Manhattan, the second oldest non-sectarian cemetery in New York City.
- North Babylon Cemetery, Babylon

=== O ===
- Oak Hill Cemetery, Nyack, New York
- Oakland Cemetery, Sag Harbor
- Oakwood Cemetery, Bay Shore
- Oakwood Cemetery, East Aurora
- Oakwood Cemetery, Niagara Falls
- Oakwood Cemetery, Syracuse
- Oakwood Cemetery, Troy
- Ocean View Cemetery, Staten Island
- Old Colonial Cemetery, Johnstown
- Old Liberty Cemetery, Liberty
- Old Sloatsburg Cemetery, Sloatsburg
- Old Town Cemetery, Newburgh
- Oswego Meeting House and Friends' Cemetery, Moore's Mill

=== P ===
- Patchogue Hebrew Cemetery, Holbrook
- Pinelawn Memorial Park, Farmingdale
- Pleasant Lawn Cemetery, Parish
- Poughkeepsie Rural Cemetery, Poughkeepsie
- Pound Ridge Cemetery, Pound Ridge

=== R ===
- Rensselaerville Cemetery, Rensselaerville
- Revolutionary War Cemetery, Salem
- Rockville Cemetery, Rockville Centre
- Rose Hills Memorial Park, Putnam Valley
- Roslyn Cemetery, Greenvale

=== S ===
- Sacred Hearts Cemetery, Southampton
- Saint Agnes Cemetery, Lake Placid
- Saint Anthony's Catholic Cemetery, Nanuet
- Saint Anthony's Lutheran Cemetery, Sanborn
- Saint Bartholomew's Episcopal Church, Manhattan
- Saint Charles Cemetery, East Farmingdale
- St. James Church Cemetery, Hyde Park
- St. John Cemetery, Middle Village
- Saint Mary’s Cemetery, Troy – Maureen Stapleton
- Saint Patrick’s Cemetery, Watervliet
- Saint Peter's Cemetery, West New Brighton, Staten Island. Oldest Catholic Cemetery on Staten Island, dating from 1848.
- Saint Peter's Cemetery, Liberty
- Saint Peter's Cemetery, Poughkeepsie
- Saint Peter's Episcopal Cemetery, Lithgow
- Saint Raymond's Cemetery, Throggs Neck, The Bronx
- Salem Fields Cemetery, Cypress Hills, Brooklyn
- Sandusky Cemetery, Sandusky, Cattaraugus County
- Second Shearith Israel Cemetery, Manhattan
- Shaarey Pardes Accabonic Grove Cemetery, East Hampton
- Silver Lake Cemetery, Staten Island (first cemetery of the Hebrew Free Burial Association)
- Sleepy Hollow Cemetery, Sleepy Hollow
- South Wales Cemetery, South Wales
- Sparta Cemetery, Ossining
- Sullivan County Veteran's Cemetery, Liberty
- Swan Lake Synagogue Cemetery, Liberty

=== T ===
- Third Shearith Israel Cemetery, Manhattan
- Trinity Church Cemetery, New York City

=== U ===
- Union Cemetery, Fort Edward
- Union Field Cemetery, Ridgewood, Queens
- United Hebrew Cemetery, Staten Island
- United Synagogue Cemetery, Calverton

=== V ===
- Vale Cemetery, Schenectady

=== W ===
- Wainscott Cemetery, Wainscott
- Wales Hollow Cemetery, Wales Hollow
- Washington Cemetery, Mapleton, Brooklyn, New York City
- Washington Memorial Park, Mount Sinai
- Wellwood Cemetery, West Babylon
- West Farms Soldiers Cemetery, West Farms, The Bronx, New York City
- West Hill Cemetery, Sherburne
- West Point Cemetery, West Point
- Westchester Hills Cemetery, Hastings-on-Hudson
- Western New York National Cemetery, Pembroke
- Westhampton Cemetery, Westhampton
- White Plains Rural Cemetery, White Plains
- Witmer Road Cemetery, Niagara Falls
- Woodlands Cemetery, Cambridge
- Woodlawn Cemetery, The Bronx, New York City
- Woodlawn Cemetery, Elmira
- Woodlawn Cemetery, New Windsor
- Woodlawn Cemetery, Orchard Park
- Woodlawn Cemetery, Syracuse
- Woodstock Cemetery, Woodstock

=== Y ===
- Youngs Memorial Cemetery, Oyster Bay

== See also ==
- List of cemeteries in New York City
- List of cemeteries in the United States
