= Blizzard of 1977 =

Deadly blizzard in New York, US, and Ontario, Canada

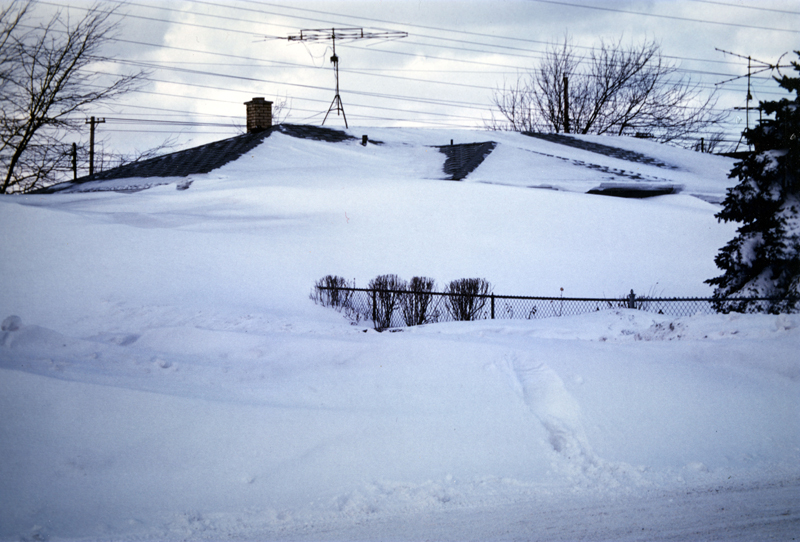
- A house almost completely buried in snow in Tonawanda, New York on January 30, 1977

Meteorological history
- Formed: January 28, 1977
- Dissipated: February 1, 1977

Blizzard
- Highest gusts: 70 mph (110 km/h)
- Max. snowfall: 100 inches (250 cm) south of Watertown, New York

Overall effects
- Fatalities: 28–29
- Damage: $300 million (1977 USD)
- Areas affected: Western New York, Central New York, Northern New York, Southern Ontario
- Part of the 1976–77 North American winter

The blizzard of 1977 hit Western New York, Central New York, Northern New York, and Southern Ontario from January 28 to February 1 of that year. Daily peak wind gusts ranging from 46 to 69 mph (74 to 111 km/h) were recorded by the National Weather Service in Buffalo, with snowfall as high as 100 in (254 cm) recorded in areas, and the high winds blew this into drifts of 30 to 40 ft (9 to 12 m). There were 23 total storm-related deaths in Western New York, with five more in northern New York.

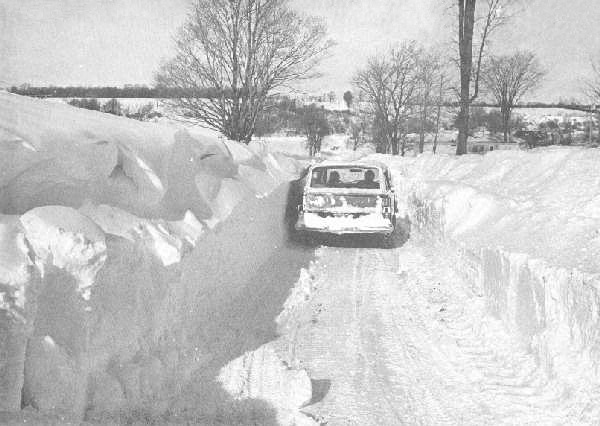
Snow drifts made travel difficult in parts of New York (February 7, 1977)

Certain pre-existing weather conditions exacerbated the blizzard's effects. November, December and January average temperatures were severely below normal. Lake Erie froze over by December 14, 1976; when this occurs, lake-effect snow does not occur because the wind cannot pick up moisture from the lake's surface, convert the moisture to snow, and then dump it when the winds reach shore.

Lake Erie was covered by a deep, powdery snow; January's unusually cold conditions limited the usual thawing and refreezing, so the snow on the frozen lake remained powdery. The drifted snow on roadways was difficult to clear because the strong wind packed the snow into a solid state. In addition to the roads becoming impassable, motorists had to deal with vehicles breaking down due to the combination of very cold temperatures, very high winds and blowing snow.

In the hardest-struck areas, snowmobiles became the only viable method of transportation. In Western New York and Southern Ontario's Niagara Peninsula, snow which was accumulated on frozen Lake Erie and snow on the ground at the start of the blizzard provided ample material for the high winds to blow into huge drifts. The combination of bitter cold, high winds, and blowing snow paralyzed areas affected by the storm. Lake Ontario rarely freezes over, which meant northern New York had to deal with considerable lake-effect snow. Coupled with the existing snow cover and wind, this had a similar effect.

== Winter of 1976–1977 ==
Weather conditions during the months leading up to the blizzard contributed to the disastrous storm. A high-amplitude planetary wave pattern set up, which was very persistent from October 1976 through January 1977, and involved a ridge over western North America and a trough over eastern North America. In January 1977, this pattern persisted, with the pressure of the strong ridge over western North America being more than two standard deviations from the mean, while the strong trough centered over eastern North America was more than three standard deviations from the mean.

A strong blocking high developed over the Arctic Ocean during January, and this moved the polar vortex to southern Canada, south of its normal location. Strong northwest flow between the ridge and the trough resulted in a strong northwest flow in between, which ushered Arctic air into the central and eastern United States. The circulation helped cause record cold for the winter over many portions of the eastern United States, with the Ohio Valley averaging more than 8 °F (4 °C) below normal. The severe winter was not limited to the northeastern United States; snow was observed in Miami, Florida, on January 20, and snow mixed with rain occurred in the Bahamas. In contrast, Alaska was exceptionally mild: Anchorage averaged 20.2 °F or 11.2 °C above normal and was in fact 2.5 °F or 1.4 °C warmer for the month than Atlanta half the distance from the equator, (Note: Atlanta set new single digit record lows during December 1976 and January 1977 although no snow fell.) whilst it was the warmest January since at least 1937 for the whole state except the North Slope and the Aleutian Islands. (Note: Over the North Slope, it was the warmest January since 1962, and over the Aleutians 1963 was equally warm and 1957 warmer.) The Pacific Northwest, located under the strong ridge, experienced unprecedented drought, with all 29 climatic divisions of Washington, Oregon and Idaho experiencing their driest October to February period on record.

== In western New York ==
=== Antecedent weather ===
During June through September, the Buffalo National Weather Service (NWS) office recorded 16.05 in (408 mm) of rain, which is wetter than the 1961–1990 average of 14.29 in (363 mm). In western New York the previously described pattern resulted in snowy and cold weather in the months leading up to the blizzard. Buffalo was a city of about 463,000 people with about 1.5 million in the metropolitan area, the second most populated city in New York State.

The first trace of snow of the winter at the Buffalo NWS weather station in Cheektowaga, New York, occurred on October 9, while the first accumulating snow was on October 21. Elsewhere in western New York, lake effect snow was observed in two periods, with up to 4 in (10 cm) on October 17–18 and up to 12 in (30 cm) on October 21–22 (O'Connell 1977). By the last day of October, Lake Erie was 48 °F (9 °C), the coldest it had been on that date.

November's air temperature in Buffalo was the coldest in nearly 100 years (since 1880), with an average temperature of 34.1 °F (1.2 °C). November's average temperature was about 11 °F (6 °C) below normal. The first three weeks of November were quite dry in Buffalo – only 0.30 in (7.6 mm) of precipitation – and November as a whole was drier than normal. During late November, some heavy snow occurred, including 19 in (48 cm) on November 30 – up to 4 ft (120 cm) in southern Erie County, Buffalo's county. The total November snowfall was recorded as 31.3 in (80 cm) in Buffalo.

December was cold and snowy, with an average temperature of 22.0 °F (−5.6 °C). Like November, December's average temperature was also about 11 °F (6 °C) below normal. December's snowfall was 60.7 in (154 cm). Daily snow depth readings varied from 2 to 26 in (5.1 to 66.0 cm), with a maximum measured snow depth of 31 in (79 cm) at 3:40 p.m. on December 2.

Lake Erie froze over by December 14; this was a record. An ice-covered Lake Erie usually puts an end to lake effect snowstorms, because the wind cannot pick up moisture from the lake's surface, convert the moisture to snow and then dump it when the winds reach shore.

The wintry weather continued in January, with the monthly average temperature being 13.8 °F (−10.1 °C), the coldest on record (records began in 1870 in Buffalo). January's average temperature was 10 °F (6 °C) below normal. It never rose to freezing in Buffalo that month, the first January that had occurred.

Prior to January 28, the day the blizzard started, it had snowed almost every day since just after Christmas. By January 27, Buffalo's snow depth was 59.1 in (150 cm). There was continuous snow cover from November 29 until the day of the blizzard, and 151.3 in (384 cm) of snow had fallen that winter prior to the blizzard – 59.1 in (150 cm) in January alone – well above normal even for a city that averages about 100 in (250 cm) of snowfall per year. This resulted in a snow depth of 33 in (84 cm) on the day the blizzard started.

Low pressure crossed Lake Erie on January 27 and moved to James Bay; it became stalled east of James Bay. Then the storm moved back west over James Bay before finally moving east to the Canadian Maritimes.

=== Prelude ===
Even before the blizzard hit, the Niagara Mohawk Power Company (which is now National Grid) had warned that snow was reaching the power lines in some areas of western New York. Also, on Thursday, January 27, severe natural gas shortages forced industries and schools to either curtail activities or to close. The governors of Minnesota, Tennessee, Ohio, Pennsylvania and New Jersey had also declared energy emergencies.

Early in the week of the blizzard, James Lindner, Commissioner of Street Sanitation for the City of Buffalo, estimated approximately 20% of cars in the city of Buffalo were illegally parked or abandoned, limiting the ability of snowplows to clear side streets and making many of them impassable. A concentrated effort to plow (and tow as necessary) – called the "Snow Blitz" by the press – managed to make significant progress on Tuesday, January 25, and Wednesday, January 26, with the help of 960 tickets and 140 tows. Even so, one source notes the side streets in Buffalo were "practically impassable" on Wednesday, January 26.

On Wednesday evening, snow squalls and high winds hit Wyoming, Cattaraugus, Allegany and Erie counties in western New York. This snowstorm closed the Buffalo Skyway, Fuhrmann Boulevard – a major route to the suburbs south of the city – and many other roads, and forced snow removal crews to focus on the major and secondary roads Wednesday night and Thursday. Many motorists were stranded on Fuhrmann Boulevard and were rescued by police and firefighters overnight Wednesday. The clearing of snow from this storm was made difficult by winds, which in one case on Thursday, January 27, transformed a clear road to one with 6 ft (2 m) drifts in less than an hour. The Greater Buffalo International Airport closed Thursday, January 27.

By late January, snow removal was hampered; 33 of the city's 79 snow plows were in for repairs. On the afternoon of Thursday, January 27, the National Guard had been called to the region with equipment to help clear the streets of snow.

=== Onset ===
==== Friday morning ====
On Thursday, January 27, an Arctic front had swept southward through the northern Great Plains to the Midwest. Between 6:00 and 7:00 am on Friday, January 28, a wall of snow accompanied the cold front's passage through Indianapolis, along with a temperature drop of almost 25 °F (14 °C). Between 7:00 and 8:00 am, Columbus, Ohio, reported similar situations. Toledo and Cleveland, Ohio, as well as Erie, Pennsylvania, were also hit strongly by the cold front. The NWS office in Erie warned "travel might be disastrous"; and there were more than 500 accidents in the area that morning.

From midnight to 11:00 am, the temperature at the Buffalo airport rose from 5 to 26 °F (−15 to −3 °C). Snow began around 5:00 am, with about 2 in (5 cm) of new snow prior to the beginning of the blizzard. At 4:00 am, the Buffalo NWS office indicated "very strong winds will once again produce near blizzard conditions beginning late this afternoon and continuing tonight". At 11:00 am, a blizzard warning was issued, which was the first time the Buffalo NWS office had done this.

That morning observers on the 16th floor of the M&T Bank Building in Buffalo watched as a gray wall covered the city; it appeared white as it came closer. A blast of wind hit the building that caused the floor to move and the glass window to creak, and then the wall of white enveloped the building. It was 11:10 am.

On the previous day, the governor of New York had decided to use the National Guard and the New York State Department of Transportation (NYSDOT) to help clean up snow in Buffalo, not knowing a blizzard would hit. Some NYSDOT equipment had arrived in Buffalo while the National Guard was not yet mobilized, but a meeting was being held at the Buffalo city garage that morning to coordinate the efforts. Before the meeting finished, Buffalo city plows started to return to the garage due to a lack of visibility; they reported they were unable to see even their own plow blades. By 11:30 am, most workers in the city of Buffalo had been released early, but few made it home. At 11:35 am, lightning was seen in the darkening sky.

The white wall of snow reached the airport around 11:30 am. associated with the cold front. Winds increased to 29 mph (47 km/h), gusting to 49 mph (79 km/h), with visibility dropping from 0.75 mi (1.2 km) to 0 where it stayed until 12:50 am the next day.

Three airplanes on the tarmac at the Greater Buffalo International Airport in Cheektowaga were waiting to take off when the blizzard hit. One of them idled for five minutes due to the blizzard hitting; this resulted in the nose wheel freezing and preventing it from turning around. It took several hours to bring the three airplanes back to the terminal since they had to do this via radio communication. The limited visibility prevented the pilots from seeing the men on the ground who would normally guide the airplane.

==== Friday afternoon ====
During the four hours after the blizzard hit, the temperature at the Buffalo airport (where the Buffalo office of the NWS is) fell from 26 to 0 °F (−3 to −18 °C).

Snow built up rapidly, with bumper-high snow being reported by 1:00 pm and 15 ft (4.6 m) high drifts by nightfall in the City of Buffalo. The depth of snow quickly caused many roads to become impassable (within 30 minutes in the part of Buffalo nearest Lake Erie), and the blowing snow caused extremely low visibilities, making travel nearly impossible.

In addition to the roads becoming impassable, motorists also had to deal with vehicles breaking down due to the combination of very cold temperatures, very high winds, and blowing snow. For example, a maintenance pickup truck at the Buffalo airport had snow blasted into the engine compartment that then melted, saturated the spark plugs, and stalled the engine. A report from Welland, Ontario, (see section below for a description of the blizzard in Canada) indicated many cars overheated when snow got under the radiator, melted, and then refroze, interfering with the fan.

Those attempting to travel by foot also found travel very difficult with the high winds, low visibility, deep snow, and very low wind chills. Visibility had dropped from 0.75 to 0 mi (1.2 to 0.0 km); winds had increased to 29 mph (47 km/h), with gusts up to 49 mph (79 km/h). Pedestrians were knocked down by the wind in city streets and struggled to regain footing, so pairs of policemen pulled them into buildings. People formed human chains from the Memorial Auditorium to people stranded in cars so the motorists would not get lost trying to find shelter.

Locations west of Buffalo that were hit by the cold front only were affected for two to three hours, and western New York was thought to be the same. By 1:30 pm, Buffalo radar indicated almost no snow, and it became clear snow was being blown off frozen Lake Erie. Since the lake had frozen in December, the snow that fell had built up on the lake (recall the Buffalo airport reported 59.1 in (150 cm) of snow in January prior to the blizzard). Lake Erie was reported to be covered by 'deep, powdery snow' at the beginning of the blizzard. During January, the unusually cold conditions limited thawing and freezing, and thus the snow on the ground (and frozen lake) did not consolidate into a form that would limit drifting.

The new snow associated with the cold front and the snow that had accumulated on land and frozen Lake Erie were all blown by the strong winds and created drifts of over 25 ft (8 m) in metropolitan Buffalo. During the blizzard, about 12 in (30 cm) of "new" snow fell, and much of this was thought to be from snow that had been in the snowpack on Lake Erie.

The drifted snow from the blizzard was difficult to clear for reasons illuminated by NWS meteorologist Ben Kolker: "The wind was so strong that it packed the snow. It broke the snow crystals up so they really packed in solidly, almost like a form of cement". As discussed later in this article, normal snow clearing methods could not be used in many cases due to the height of the drifts and the tight packing of the snow.

==== Friday evening ====
The worst conditions of the blizzard in Buffalo occurred during the late afternoon of Friday, January 28, as winds averaged 40 knots (46 mph; 74 km/h) and gusted to 60 knots [69 mph (111 km/h)] with wind chills of −60 to −70 °F (−51 to −57 °C) (NWS pre-2001 wind chill calculation method).

That night people stayed in whatever shelter they could find, with 700 people staying in the Donovan State Office Building, 200 in the Rath Building, 300 in the Memorial Auditorium, etc. Authorities estimated 13,000 people were stranded Friday night in downtown Buffalo and that many in the surrounding areas as well — e.g. 1,700 at Bell Aerosystems in Wheatfield, 2,500 at Harrison Radiator Company in Lockport.

With many roads becoming impassable, the City of Buffalo police were almost immobile by Friday evening. Through radio and television, citizens were asked to loan snowmobiles and four-wheel drive vehicles to the Buffalo police; police used them to answer calls. Looting broke out and items stolen included radios and firefighters' clothing from fire trucks, as well as more than $1,500 in medical supplies from a stuck ambulance. Cigarettes, liquor, beer, coffee, meat and refrigerators were stolen from abandoned semi-trailer trucks. There was also looting from factories, stores (including two jewelry stores and a furniture/appliance store) and homes. Nearly 100 people were arrested for looting.

A fire broke out at Whitney Place and Virginia Street, in the City of Buffalo, on Friday evening. Fire trucks rammed through stalled cars in an attempt to get to the scene and fire hoses were stretched two to three blocks to reach the fire, as that is as far as the fire trucks were able to make it. The National Guard assisted in taking firemen to the scene in four-wheel drive vehicles.

Not only did the weather frustrate efforts to reach the scene, but also it hampered the ability to fight the fire. Attempts to disconnect hoses to move them resulted in the water freezing and bursting the hoses. Since the street drains were blocked with snow, runoff water from the fire rose to the running boards on the fire department's pumpers. When this water froze, it required jackhammers to extricate the pumpers. Hoses also had to be removed with jackhammers. Some fire truck pumpers stalled in the snow when wind blew into the engines or they ran out of fuel. Since their design necessitated the use of water instead of antifreeze as a coolant, the water in the pumper froze and ruined them.

The fire was eventually extinguished, but not before six or seven houses were destroyed and 50 people left homeless. Virginia Street and Whitney Place were closed for more than two weeks following the fire due to vehicles stuck in the ice. Firemen used snowmobiles to rescue trapped people, and to transport nurses and doctors to the hospitals; they also used four-wheel drive vehicles to deliver medicine.

On Friday, volunteers on four-wheel drive vehicles and snowmobiles delivered food (a few thousand dollars' worth every 45 minutes) for the Salvation Army from their Buffalo headquarters. The Red Cross opened eight shelters in Erie County, New York, on Friday, and snowmobile clubs provided volunteers to deliver food, blood and medicine. Snowmobiles were also used to rescue people from the Skyway, as well as from another expressway.

=== Duration and cleanup ===
==== Saturday, January 29 ====
By midnight Friday, an estimated 2,000 cars were stranded on Main Street and about 8,000 on other streets in the City of Buffalo. By Saturday morning, visibility improved and the City sent their plows back out. The many abandoned cars made their job more difficult. By 6:00 am, Buffalo's Commissioner of Street Sanitation had 30 private tow trucks removing vehicles; later in the day, the number would rise to 50. Saturday afternoon, dump trucks and payloaders dumped snow into the Niagara River.

On Saturday, blizzard conditions prevailed and the Buffalo Courier-Express did not publish for the first time in its 143-year history, and The Buffalo Evening News published only 10,000 copies. On Friday, January 28, New York State Governor Hugh L. Carey requested that portions of New York State be declared a major disaster area; on Saturday, President Jimmy Carter declared an "emergency" for all of New York and Pennsylvania that resulted in a declaration of emergency specifically for the western New York counties of Cattaraugus, Chautauqua, Erie, and Niagara. At 11:10 am, during a short break in the storm, a National Guard C-130 was able to land at the Buffalo Airport.

A record low for the date, −7 °F (−22 °C) was set, breaking the old record set in 1885, and a peak wind gust of 51 mph (82 km/h) was recorded. During midafternoon, the lull in the storm ended and the winds once again blew strong, causing new drifting. The storm continued; the low-pressure center with which the cold front was associated stalled east of James Bay and then "moved back west over James Bay before finally moving east to the Canadian Maritimes".

==== Sunday, January 30 ====
Early Sunday morning, the wind and snow decreased somewhat and the sun was seen at times. Buffalo city plows and NYSDOT equipment were able to open several major roads (Main, Broadway, Michigan, Sycamore, Walden, Fillmore, Ohio, and much of South Park and Delaware).

President Carter appointed Federal Disaster Assistance Administration Region II (Northeast) Director, Thomas Casey, as the federal coordinating officer in charge of the U.S. federal government response to the blizzard; Casey arrived with New York Governor Hugh Carey at the Buffalo airport in a C-130 at noon Sunday. With the weather clearing and single lanes cleared on some roads, many sightseers drove into Buffalo. At 3:00 pm, the wind increased and blowing snow once again decreased visibility such that driving became treacherous. Hundreds were stranded anew and their abandoned cars blocked roads that had been cleared. A peak gust of 58 mph (93 km/h) was recorded at the Buffalo airport (NWS Buffalo Office 2006a) and that night the wind chill fell to −40 °F (−40 °C) (NWS pre-2001 wind chill calculation method).

At 8:00 pm, the National Guardsmen, in their cold-weather gear, began assisting the City of Buffalo Street Sanitation Department with clearing roads to Buffalo hospitals. Since Friday afternoon, walking multiple blocks had been necessary to reach most hospitals. Before the end of the storm, over 500 National Guardsmen were helping in the disaster.

By evening, some areas of western New York had, along with banning traffic, also banned snowmobiles; a snowmobiler was injured in a collision with a chimney on top of a house, and others had come dangerously close to power lines due to the high drifts. In Newstead approximately 30 ft (9.1 m) drifts led to the suspension of even emergency snowmobile traffic due to the power line danger.

==== Monday, January 31 ====
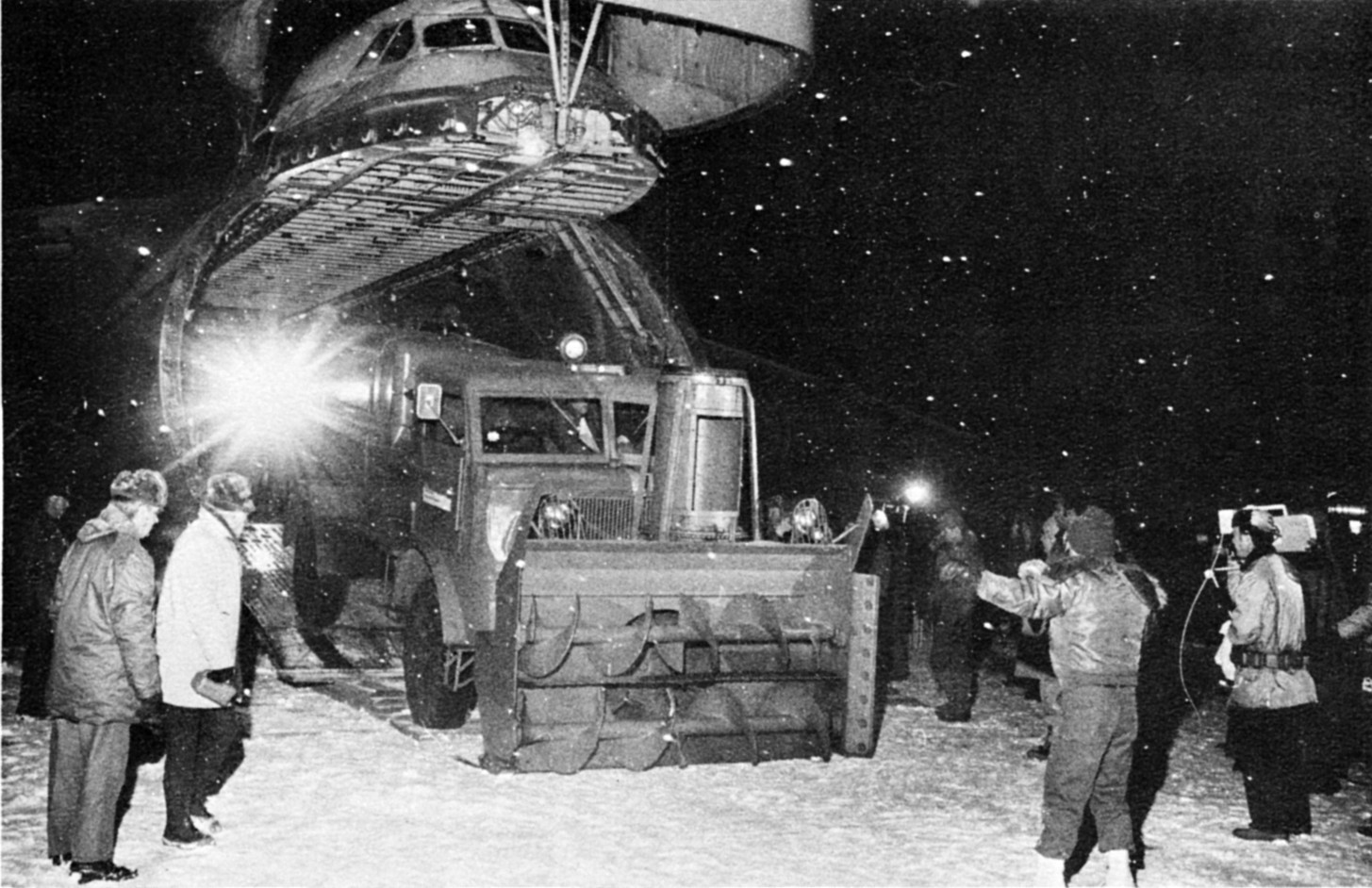
Snow fighting equipment being unloaded from a C-5A at Niagara Falls International Airport

Many towns in western New York banned unnecessary travel for several days. Driving bans during the storm were imposed in the cities of Niagara Falls and Buffalo, Niagara County, and many other locations. Most roads in Cheektowaga were closed by snow overnight Sunday, and the fire department was "checking houses snow-covered to their roofs to make sure nobody was freezing or suffocating". The supervisor of the Town of Clarence, in addition to ordering all motorists ticketed, authorized the fire department to seize gasoline to prevent driving, if necessary. In Lancaster, only two north–south routes were open. An early Sunday morning helicopter tour by Erie County Sheriff Ken Braun had revealed about 125 cars and trucks almost totally buried in the Lancaster area, as well as a young man leaning against a street light strung across an intersection. Some towns were using metal detectors to locate buried cars before using heavy equipment to clear the snow.

Light snow fell throughout Monday, with variable winds gusting at times to more than 40 mph (64 km/h) with a peak gust of 46 mph (74 km/h) at the Buffalo airport. Only 20 of the usual 400 Niagara Frontier Transportation Authority buses were running, and those were reserved for necessary travel. From when the blizzard struck Friday until Monday, there were no intercity bus, Amtrak train and commercial air services to Buffalo. The US Army Corps of Engineers (USACE) had been brought in by the Federal Disaster Assistance Administration to assist in the cleanup effort; they received a mission statement on Sunday for emergency snow removal. The USACE named their effort "Operation Snow Go 1977", and got their first contractor to start clearing snow on Monday. Three hundred U.S. Army soldiers from an engineer battalion at Fort Bragg, North Carolina, joined the effort.

During Monday night, police continued searching vehicles stranded since Friday, and the wind increased again to 50 mph (80 km/h).

==== Next seven days ====
On Tuesday, February 1, Buffalo Mayor Stanley Makowski declared a state of emergency that prohibited nonessential travel. Violation of the travel ban could potentially result in a US$500 fine and 90 days in jail, which was sufficient to limit the number of people ticketed to 97. Following a Monday request by Governor Carey, on Tuesday, Tom Casey added Orleans, Genesee, and Wyoming counties in western New York and Jefferson and Lewis counties in northern New York to the emergency declaration. On Tuesday afternoon, the winds diminished to about 10 mph (16 km/h), and the sun came out.

On Wednesday, February 2, there was also occasional sun. Mail service resumed in the City of Buffalo with the help of six four-wheel drive trucks brought in from Rochester, the first mail delivery since the previous Friday. Fuhrmann Boulevard was cleared, allowing workers trapped at the Freezer Queen plant since Friday to leave, and freeing Coast Guard personnel trapped behind 15 ft (4.6 m) drifts at the end of the road, who had been stranded by the snow the night before the blizzard (Thursday, January 27). In addition, many major roads in the city were completely cleared Wednesday, including South Park Avenue, Delaware and Tupper.

Thursday morning, February 3, Mayor Makowski lifted the travel ban without consulting state or federal officials, and many people drove into Buffalo. They found the parking lots were not cleared, so left their cars in the roads. This turned many four-lane roads into two-lane roads. The NWS had forecast snow for Thursday, and the new snow arrived accompanied by winds, resulting in near-zero visibility and some areas claiming worse conditions than the previous Friday when the blizzard initially struck. A state of emergency continued or was declared in additional areas, including Alden, Brant, Evans, Lancaster, Newstead, North Collins, Wales, and West Seneca. Many roads in southern Erie County, as well as Niagara, Chautauqua, and Wyoming counties, were drifted shut. At midnight Thursday, Buffalo's driving ban was put back in place.

Under pressure from many levels of elected government officials to declare blizzard-affected regions major disaster areas, President Carter sent his son, James Earl (Chip) Carter, and special presidential advisor, Margaret Costanza, to survey the situation on Friday, February 4; the visit included traveling to Buffalo, Lancaster and Cheektowaga.

On Saturday, President Carter declared the counties of Cattaraugus, Chautauqua, Erie, Genesee, Niagara, Orleans and Wyoming in western New York, and the counties of Jefferson and Lewis in northern New York, a major disaster area; this is the first time a snowstorm was declared a federal disaster area. The previous emergency declaration had resulted in the federal government only assisting in snow removal, whereas the major disaster declaration caused the federal government assistance to be "expanded to include everything to protect life and property and to provide whatever materials and equipment that were required to relieve the emergency and restore the area to normalcy". The declaration also allowed the local governments to deal directly with private contractors and be reimbursed by the federal government instead of the USACE employing private contractors.

On Friday morning, February 4, the NWS had forecast that early Saturday a storm would hit with about 3 in (7.6 cm)) of new snow accompanied by strong winds, but the storm did not strike Buffalo. That weekend the Winter Carnival in Buffalo was postponed for the third time due to the too-wintry weather.

On Monday, February 7, the driving ban that had been in place since February 3 was lifted at midnight. Cars were required to have at least three people in them and a citywide speed limit of 20 mph (32 km/h) was enacted. That Monday, at least 100 residents of Concord, Erie County, New York were still isolated Many colleges and schools in western New York reopened that day, after having been closed since Thursday, January 27, seven consecutive snow days.

Since the local governments were now able to be directly reimbursed by the federal government for contracting with companies for snow removal, the USACE was not assigned further work as of February 8; they finished work in progress and completed their contracting efforts on February 13. The coordinator of the federal disaster relief, Casey, pulled out the Fort Bragg troops on February 8. By February 9, the City of Buffalo had signed agreements with private firms to finish the snow removal, a task that would take nine more days.

The temperature rose above freezing for the first time since Christmas on February 9, with a high of 34 °F (1 °C). The Buffalo mayor also lifted the rule requiring at least three people per car between the hours of 7:00 pm and 6:00 am. The next day, it rose to 39 °F (4 °C) and then made it to about 45 °F (7 °C) the next three days. On February 11, Mayor Makowski lifted the driving ban at noon, but the citywide 20 mph (32 km/h) speed limit remained in effect. Buffalo city schools reopened on February 14, after more than 10 consecutive snow days. One school remained open through the blizzard. The Gow School, a residential school in South Wales. Food supplies began to dwindle by Monday, January 31, and so the school's food services had to negotiate with the army for helicopter delivery since the school's own trucks were immobilized by the storm.

=== Aftermath ===
The high winds of the blizzard packed the snow so tightly and high, drifts reached 30 ft (9 m) in places; normal snow removal equipment was ineffective, and earth-moving equipment, such as front-end loaders, had to be used. Colonel Daniel Ludwig of the USACE stated the "snow was very densely packed and that snow plows would be virtually useless on most of the roads". NWS meteorologist Ben Kolker noted on one of the roads near the NWS forecast office, high lifts were used "to dig away at it and break it up like big hunks of rock". In Depew, a suburb of Buffalo, volunteer firemen used a trenching machine to get people out of a house that had been drifted shut. The long cleanup period included the railroads, who used front-end loaders to clear snow from the rail yard into open-bodied rail cars and shipped it east by Conrail.

Sixteen of 25 towns in Erie County, as well as the City of Buffalo, declared states of emergency and banned all nonessential traffic at some time during the storm. The USACE normal work force, plus personnel from other USACE installations, resulted in a total of 353 USACE personnel working on the recovery effort. The USACE Buffalo District overall effort (including both western and northern New York) reported $6.8 million used in paying 216 private contractors to plow 3,186 miles of road in 9 counties using about 1,000 pieces of equipment and US$700,000 of in-house costs. Other military assistance included 500 National Guard troops, 320 U. S. Army Airborne troops, the 20th Engineer Brigade from Fort Bragg, 65–70 U.S. Marines, as well as assistance from the U.S. Air Force. The National Guard operation was entitled Task Force Western, with headquarters at the Connecticut Street Armory in Buffalo, and included providing 9–10 Army-type ambulances along with operators for use in the City of Buffalo when almost no normal ambulances were able to operate.

The Salvation Army fed between 67,000 and 176,000 people, provided clothing for about 4,500, and housed 851, for a cost of US$75,000 to US$150,000, using 1,000 volunteers and over 400 snowmobiles. A Salvation Army official noted the disaster was unique in that "it covered 9 counties and nobody could get in". The American Red Cross distributed 5 tons (4500 kg) of food at 84–92 locations, feeding about 50,000 people.

The total snowfall for Buffalo during the storm was only 12 in (30 cm). The blizzard was made unique by the sustained winds, gusting up to 69 mph (111 km/h), which picked up the snowdrifts piled on the frozen Lake Erie and dumped that snow load in western New York and southern Ontario. The winds were accompanied by Arctic-cold temperatures, making it feel like −60 °F (−51 °C) outside Whiteout conditions had trapped people at work, in cars and in homes; some had to stay for a day, while others had to stay for the storm's duration. At the Buffalo Zoo, 8 ft (2.4 m) drifts allowed three reindeer to walk over their fence and wander about the city; also, over 20 animals died during the storm.

There were 23 total storm-related deaths in western New York, with 11 in the City of Buffalo, plus seven more in the rest of Erie County, three in Wyoming County, and one each in both Niagara and Orleans counties. At least nine were found buried in cars, while others involved heart attacks while shoveling snow, and car accidents. The above-stated death tolls are listed in the USACE report on cleanup efforts in the storm, while a slightly different death toll is listed by the NWS on their Blizzard of 1977 webpage, which indicates 29 deaths resulted from the storm. The Buffalo Area Chamber of Commerce estimated a total economic loss for Erie and Niagara counties combined of US$221,490,000 for the 5.5-day period starting on January 28, with 175,000 people losing wages of US$36,250,000. An estimated $20 million or more was spent removing snow, with USACE alone spending over $6 million on contractors in western New York. Total damage reached $300 million. For 11 days, national media showed images of a city covered in snow up to roofs of houses.

Equipment from Colorado, New York City and Toronto, among others, was used in the cleanup of snow. Abandoned vehicles were towed to designated parking areas, and the snow was hauled to dump areas where some remained until early May. Although March was 8 °F (4.5 °C) above normal, the snow melted gradually, so there were no significant flooding problems.

== Southern Ontario ==
The entire Niagara Peninsula of Southern Ontario was significantly impacted by the blizzard, although the southern parts of the Peninsula across the Niagara River from Buffalo and extending westward along the northern edge of the frozen, snow-covered Lake Erie were hit the hardest. This was indicated by reports that the worst conditions were limited to closer to the lakeshore than in western New York. For example, compare reports in that conditions were much better 1 to 2 mi (1.6 to 3.2 km) inland and reports in from a military commander noting an airborne view made it clear the worst was right along the shore, with reports from western New York with snow near street-light level in well-inland Lancaster. The hardest hit coastal communities included Fort Erie, Port Colborne and Wainfleet. Areas of Southern Ontario as far away as London to the west, Kitchener to the northwest, and Toronto to the northeast also experienced high winds and blowing snow, particularly on January 28.

As with western New York, the southern Niagara Peninsula had experienced a significant amount of snowfall prior to the blizzard commencing on Friday, January 28. Port Colborne had received 136.4 centimetres (53.7 in) since Christmas and Fort Erie had gotten 103.5 centimetres (40.7 in) since Christmas, with 17.8 centimetres (7.0 in) and 27.9 centimetres (11.0 in) of Fort Erie's amount having fallen on January 26 and 27, and 5.1 centimetres (2.0 in) and 3.8 centimetres (1.5 in) of Port Colborne's having arrived those days.

As stated previously, the storm, with consistent winds of 70 km/h and gusts of 100 to 120 km/h, struck suddenly late in the morning Friday, January 28. The resultant blowing snow causing zero visibility and drifting snow making roads impassable causing many vehicles becoming stuck in the snow, causing their occupants to abandon them. That day 16.5 centimetres (6.5 in) of additional snow fell in the Port Colborne-Wainfleet area. That night, 250 people were stranded in the International Nickel Company plant in Port Colborne. Although schools closed when informed of the impending storm, the rapid onset of the storm resulted in about 1,000 students being stranded overnight on January 28, in Port Colborne and Wainfleet schools (about 2,000 students total were stranded in the Niagara region altogether). On Saturday, January 29, 10.2 centimetres (4.0 in) more snow was deposited in Port Colbourne-Wainfleet area and the high winds continued to cause blizzard conditions and high drifts of snow. That night, at 6 p.m., 800 students were still trapped, with 600 of them in Wainfleet and Port Colborne. On Sunday, a day when the winds decreased until the mid-afternoon but an additional 11.7 centimetres (4.6 in) of snow fell, the remaining students were taken from the schools with the help of the militia; some students were housed in nearby houses. In some areas, buses had become stranded trying to take children home from school Friday, so bus drivers had taken the children to nearby houses. On Monday, January 31 a further 8.1 centimetres (3.2 in) of snow fell in Port Colborne and windy conditions caused more blowing snow and higher snow drifts. Looting of radios from abandoned cars, as well as looting of soda pop from a truck was reported.

The Long Beach and the Lowbanks areas of Wainfleet were very strongly affected by the storm. In Wainfleet, one resident reported early in the storm the wind broke a window facing the lake and snow rapidly began drifting in the house, which caused significant damage. In the Lowbanks area, a resident reported the storm smashed in windows and collapsed doors; they had lost power and heat and were burning furniture in the fireplace to keep warm. Ontario Hydro noted some power outages lasted 72 hours; it took an average of 24 hours to get power restored for some larger customers. The depth of drifts in the hardest hit areas was extreme. Snowmobilers reported passing over vehicles, as well as onto the roof of a house, without knowing it, and snowmobiling over the top of a school bus without being able to see its roof. In the Long Beach area, snow reached the power lines, with people stepping over and rolling under them, and only the chimneys of houses were visible above the snow. Along the lakeshore in Wainfleet, the mayor reported drifts up to 45 ft (14 m), and in Lowbanks, a military officer reported drifts of 30 to 40 ft (9 to 12 m) with only the steeple of a church visible. One drift estimated at 40 ft (12 m) remained until June 1, while snow banks reportedly lasted until the first week of June in the Cedar Bay area.

Snowmobiles were widely used to deliver aid and provide transportation. Niagara Regional Police Service enlisted the help of 60 snowmobiles and 15 four-wheel drive vehicles for use for regular police calls, as well as to deliver food and medication. Snowmobiles were also used to transport doctors and nurses, and Ontario Hydro workers. In Fort Erie, where the storm deposited 12.7 centimetres (5.0 in), 30.5 centimetres (12.0 in), 11.2 centimetres (4.4 in) and 11.2 centimetres (4.4 in) of snow on the four days, snowmobiles were being dispatched from all six fire halls to provide aid. CB radio operators were used by the Niagara Regional Police for communication. The radio station CHOW facilitated communication by allowing people to call in and air needs on the radio, a role confirmed via a plaque from the Port Colborne Chamber of Commerce and scrolls from the Welland Chamber of Commerce.

The Canadian Forces assisted in the situation under police direction. For example, the mayor of Port Colborne requested military assistance from the Emergency Measures Organization in St. Catharines that resulted in an Army Reserve Battalion being sent and militia assisting in searching for stranded motorists. In a deployment headquartered at the Regional Police Station in Niagara Falls and stationed at the Lake Street Armoury in St. Catharines and the Niagara Falls Armoury in Niagara Falls, 156 reserves militia and 9 regular force soldiers helped in disaster relief. Regional authorities requested military assistance in the afternoon of January 29, and the first unit was called at 3:30 pm, with 130 employed in the operation by the next morning. Their initial priorities were to "preserve life, clear main arteries into the communities of Port Colborne and Fort Erie, and try to open Highway 3 between Port Colborne and Fort Erie".

Farmers in Wainfleet dumped milk since it could not be transported out, and they also had trouble getting feed to their animals. The snow was difficult to plow; one road, near the lakeshore, could not be opened with a big front-end loader or a large bulldozer; instead, a small bulldozer with a bucket took 2.5 days to clear about 300 yards (270 m) of road. One resident noted they were snowed in for 19 days before being plowed out on February 14. One effect of the prolonged confinement at home many people experienced in the fall of that year was a marked increase in births at local hospitals (almost 18% in Regional Niagara in Canada).

Other cities on the Niagara Peninsula, such as St. Catharines Thorold, Niagara Falls, Welland and Dunnville were significantly impacted, while Hamilton was not hit as badly by the storm. Dunnville, 20 km west of Wainfleet, experienced piercing snow from the late morning onward, resulting in the schools closing before lunchtime; the cars of some teachers who stayed for a couple hours to ensure all the students were picked up, got stuck in snow drifts not far from the school so they were stranded overnight. Snowmobile services were set up at certain locations around the town and the Ontario Provincial Police transported the teachers and other stranded people home one-by-one by snowmobile Saturday night and Sunday. The airport closest to Dunnville, in Simcoe 50 km to the west, recorded consistent winds of 50 km/h and blizzard conditions (blowing snow and visibility of 0.2 km or less) for the whole afternoon of January 28, and very low visibility for much of January 29 (0.4 km to 0.8 km) and for most of January 31 (about 0.6 km).

St. Catharines, situated on the north side of the Niagara Peninsula on the shore of Lake Ontario, had winds between 50 and 70 km/h with blowing snow causing low visibility/almost blizzard conditions (0.4 km visibility) the entire afternoon of January 28, and had winds between 40 and 60 km/h and reduced visibility (approximately 0.8 km) most of January 29, and variable reduced visibility (ranging from 0.4 km to 1.2 km) for much of January 31, before the winds and blowing snow curtailed on February 1. Winds gust were as high as 98 km/h on January 28 and 93 km/h on January 31 leading to wind chill temperatures of −16.9 °C and −14.6 °C on those days, while 8.8 cm of snow was distributed on the city on January 28 and with lower amounts between 0.5 and 1.5 cm on the other days of the blizzard. Hamilton had blizzard conditions of blowing snow and visibility between 0 and 0.4 km from 11 a.m. to 5 p.m. and semi-blizzard conditions (visibility about 0.8 km) for most of the evening on January 28 with total snow of 4.5 cm and peak wind gusts of 89 km/h.

London experienced consistent winds of about 50 km/h which caused blowing snow and near zero visibility (0.2 km or less) for the entire afternoon of January 28 even though only 6.9 centimetres (2.7 in) of new snow was deposited that day. Consistent winds of 35 to 40 km/h continued over three of the next four days, resulting in drifting and blowing snow causing reduced visibility (between 1 and 1.6 km) for almost all of January 29, low visibility (between 0.6 and 1.2 km) for almost all of January 31, and reduced visibility (between 1.2 and 1.6 km) for several hours on February 1, although only 6.9 centimetres (2.7 in) additional snow fell over the four days. The military, with reserves plus a 900-man infantry battalion, was called in to assist clearing snow drifts and stranded people in the London area, but conditions there were not as serious as the southern Niagara Region, with four wheel-drive vehicles being generally sufficient for transportation.

Kitchener had 3 hours of blizzard conditions (0 to 0.4 km visibility) the afternoon of January 28 with wind gusts up to 81 Km/h even though its total snow was only 5.7 cm that day.

== Northern New York ==
Portions of northern New York state, particularly Jefferson and Lewis counties, were also hard hit. At 3:10 pm, on Friday, January 28, Watertown reported zero visibility and wind gusting to 28 mph (45 km/h) as the cold front that had moved through southern Ontario and Western New York advanced through northern New York. The Watertown region received 8 to 12 in (20 to 30 cm) of snow with the cold front, but unfrozen Lake Ontario (in contrast to frozen Lake Erie), along with atmospheric conditions favorable for lake effect snow, allowed snow bands to form that resulted in storm totals of 66 in (168 cm) in Watertown, 72.5 in (184.2 cm) in Mansville, 93 in (236 cm) Fort Drum, and more than 100 in (254 cm) in areas southeast of Watertown. The snow, along with the winds, resulted in drifts of 15 to 30 ft (5 to 9 m), and stranded of more than 1,000 motorists.

After beginning with the cold-front passage at 3:10 pm on January 28 at Watertown, the blizzard's winds peaked at 49 mph (79 km/h) at 7:00 pm. That night, about 150 people were stranded at the Chesebrough-Pond factory in Watertown. Three radio announcers at radio station 1410 AM WOTT in Watertown were stranded without food, and each of them worked 8-hour shifts to keep the station on 24 hours per day, playing music and taking hundreds of calls from North Country residents in need of services, such as fuel, food or reassurance. Jefferson County Sheriff's deputies brought the announcers provisions via snowmobile on the fifth day of their entrapment. Oddly enough, though the snow was piled up over the roof of the studios on Gifford Road, the morning announcer's VW Bug parked next to the building was totally clear of snow, thanks to prevailing winds. It took him over 5 hours to travel the 8 mi (13 km) to his home in Brownville, as only one lane was clear on several of the roads he traveled.

During the storm, a Radio Emergency Associated Communication Teams (REACT) CB team set up at the plant to coordinate help for those needing things such as medical assistance, The Red Cross also set up at the factory, and snowmobiles and four-wheel drive vehicles were dispatched. After a lull at Watertown, the storm restarted at 2:30 am on January 29, and lasted until 10:00 pm. This portion of the storm included gusts to 50 mph (80 km/h) and heavy snow. The storm then abated at Watertown, but at 2:00 pm on Sunday, visibility returned to zero. By midnight Sunday, 34 in (86 cm) of new snow had fallen since Friday, January 28, at 7:00 am. The blizzard continued throughout Monday, January 31, with an additional 17 in (43 cm) of new snow before the snow stopped around 8:00 am on February 1.

Due to the lower wind speeds than those that occurred in western New York, the snow in northern New York was not as hard packed according to Ben Kolker of the NWS office in Buffalo. Northern New York did have significant snowfall, though, along with significant drifting. On February 1, Jefferson and Lewis counties were among the counties added to the initial federal emergency declaration, and on February 5, were among the counties declared major disaster areas. The New York District of the USACE assisted with snow clearing by having contractors clear a total of 450 mi (720 km) of roadway in Jefferson and Lewis counties. U.S. Marines were at Camp Drum (near Watertown) for cold-weather training, and some of them assisted in Jefferson and Lewis counties with fourteen 25-ton Amtrack vehicles, The National Guard assisted with track vehicles; U.S. Army troops from Camp Drum also helped with disaster relief.

Since food and supplies were in short supply in the area by the end of the storm, on February 1, the travel ban was lifted from 7:00 am until noon so 1,900 stranded travelers could leave the area. Agricultural interests were adversely affected by the storm, with the dairy industry hardest hit due to farmers' inability to get milk to market. In Jefferson County alone, about 85% of dairy farmers were forced to dump milk because tank trucks could not reach farms. This contributed to $8 million in agricultural losses. Other problems included barns collapsing from the snow (seven in Jefferson County), feed and grain shortages, disposal of manure, and farmers being unable to reach barns to feed cattle. Five deaths were reported in northern New York as a result of the storm, all due to heart attacks (four occurring while shoveling snow and another in his car).

At the end of the blizzard period on February 1, a National Weather Service spotter at Barnes Corners, Lewis County, measured a snow depth of 108" on the level. Anecdotal reports from eastern sections of Lorraine, Jefferson County, which was close to the area of heaviest snowfall, estimated snow depths of ten feet.

On February 9, about a week after the storm ended, the average snow depth in the Black River basin (about 2,000 sq mi (5,200 km^{2})) which include Jefferson, Lewis and other counties was 40.4 in (102.6 cm), having a liquid equivalent of 8.06 in (205 mm) that raised flooding concerns. Sears Pond, about 20 mi (32 km) southeast of Watertown, recorded a snow depth of 77.3 in (196 cm) with a liquid equivalent of 19.23 in (488.4 mm).

== New Jersey ==
In New Jersey, Rutgers University was forced to shut down classes for the first time ever.

== Cultural references ==
=== Music ===
The alternative rock band Nada Surf recorded a song in 2002 titled "Blizzard of '77", which opens with the following lyrics: "In the blizzard of '77 / The cars were just lumps on the snow."

Canadian post-hardcore band Alexisonfire released their third studio album, Crisis in 2006, which had a victim of the blizzard with frostbitten hands as the cover art and the title song, and contains many lyrics directly referring to the blizzard, including the repeated lyrics "One nine seven seven."

Jimmy Buffett's 1978 album Son of a Son of a Sailor included the song "Mañana", which lyrics include: "Yeah, they're freezin' up in Buffalo stuck in their cars."

The pop punk band The Ataris recorded a song in 2025 titled "Car Song" in which the singer says "I was born in the blizzard of 1977".

=== Literature ===
Two books have been written about it, The Blizzard by Robert Bahr and White Death – The Blizzard of '77, which is a compilation by Erno Rossi of accounts of the blizzard from both southern Ontario and western New York (Rossi 1999; note the original edition of the book was entitled White Death – Blizzard of '77 and published in 1978).

=== Other ===
A board game, called The Blizzard of '77 Travel Game was created after the storm. In it, the players drive around the board, trying to collect goods, such as groceries, bank, work, drug store, and hardware with 2 safe spots of home and gasoline, before the storm hits. Once the storm hits, the board is flipped over to the "Blizzard" side and the players must continue in blizzard conditions.

A set of six glasses was sold by the Buffalo Courier-Express newspaper with reproductions of newspaper articles about the storm on them.

== See also ==
- Great Snowstorm of 1944
- Blizzard of 1966
- 1971 Great Lakes blizzard
- Great Blizzard of 1978—January 1978
- Northeastern United States blizzard of 1978—February 1978
- Lake Storm "Aphid"—October 2006
- February 2013 nor'easter
- November 13–21, 2014 North American winter storm–"Snowvember"
- Late December 2022 North American winter storm
