= Aurora, Erie County, New York =

Aurora
- Town
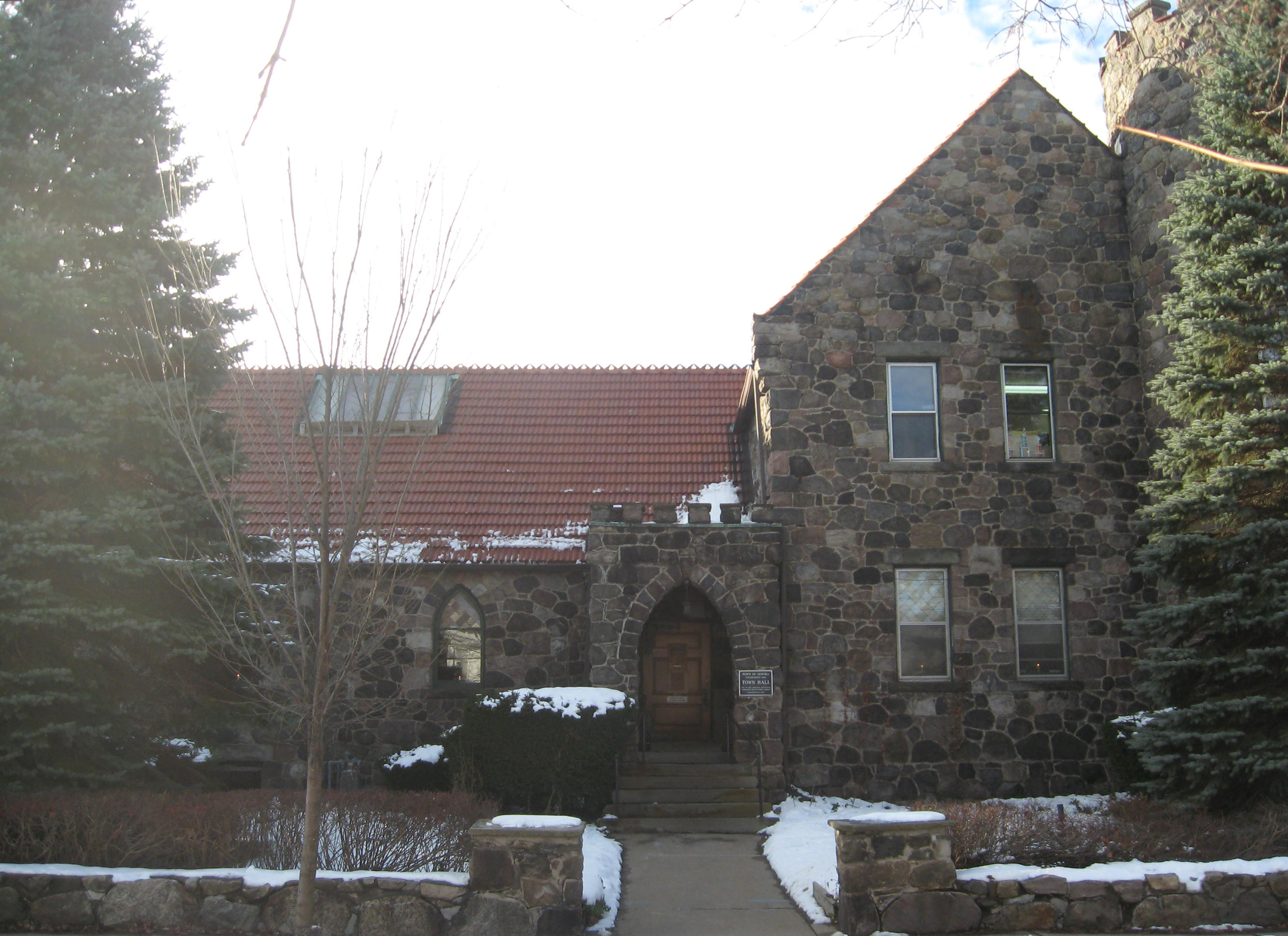
- Former Town Hall

- Logo

- Location in Erie County and New York.
- Coordinates: 42°46′05″N 78°36′45″W
- Country: United States
- State: New York
- County: Erie County
- Incorporated: 1818

Area
  - Total: 36.4 sq mi (94 km^{2})
  - Land: 36.4 sq mi (94 km^{2})
  - Water: 0.05 sq mi (0.13 km^{2})
- Elevation: 918 ft (280 m)

Population (2020)
  - Total: 13,943 ▲
  - Density: 383/sq mi (148/km^{2})
- Time zone: UTC-5 (EST)
  - Summer (DST): UTC-4 (EDT)
- ZIP Codes: 14052 (East Aurora); 14127 (Orchard Park); 14139 (South Wales); 14170 (West Falls)
- Area code: 716
- Website: www.townofaurorany.gov

Aurora is a town in Erie County, New York, United States. The population was 13,782 at the 2010 census. It is one of the "Southtowns" of Erie County and is also erroneously called "East Aurora", the name of its principal village. The town is centrally located in the county, southeast of Buffalo.

The former Christ the King Seminary is located in the northern part of the town.

== History ==
The town was created in 1818 from the (now defunct) town of Willink, which once contained all the southern part of Erie County. By a close vote, citizens voted to change the name to "Aurora" in a display of their growing dissatisfaction with the Holland Land Company and its stockholders, which included Willem Willink.

== Notable people ==
- Horace Boies, 14th governor of Iowa
- Millard Fillmore, US President, practiced law in Aurora and lived in a house on Main Street (now a National Historic Landmark on Shearer Avenue) before he became president.
- Millard Powers Fillmore, son of President Fillmore
- Elbert Hubbard, writer, publisher, artist, and philosopher. He founded Roycroft, an Arts and Crafts movement community in East Aurora in 1895.
- Irving Price, co-founder of the Fisher-Price toy company, purchased the Fillmore home, which his wife used as an art studio.

== Geography ==
According to the United States Census Bureau, the town has a total area of 36.4 square miles (94.4 km^{2}), of which 36.4 square miles (94.3 km^{2}) is land and 0.04 square miles (0.1 km^{2}), or 0.13%, is water.

New York State Route 240 is a major route through the southwest part of the town.

New York State Route 400 begins in the southeast part of the town.

== Education ==
The East Aurora Union Free School District is a school district within the town. The superintendent is Brian Russ. The district operates three schools: East Aurora High School, East Aurora Middle School, and Parkdale Elementary School. East Aurora Schools have been recognized by the National Blue Ribbon Schools Program. The Middle School in 2012 and the High School in 2017.

Small portions of the town are covered by the Holland Central School District, Iroquois Central School District, and Orchard Park Central School District.

== Demographics ==
Historical population
| Census | Pop. | Note | %± |
|---|---|---|---|
| 1820 | 1,285 | | — |
| 1830 | 2,421 | | 88.4% |
| 1840 | 2,908 | | 20.1% |
| 1850 | 3,435 | | 18.1% |
| 1860 | 2,580 | | −24.9% |
| 1870 | 2,573 | | −0.3% |
| 1880 | 2,723 | | 5.8% |
| 1890 | 3,266 | | 19.9% |
| 1900 | 4,015 | | 22.9% |
| 1910 | 4,479 | | 11.6% |
| 1920 | 5,312 | | 18.6% |
| 1930 | 6,875 | | 29.4% |
| 1940 | 7,656 | | 11.4% |
| 1950 | 9,271 | | 21.1% |
| 1960 | 12,888 | | 39.0% |
| 1970 | 14,426 | | 11.9% |
| 1980 | 13,872 | | −3.8% |
| 1990 | 13,433 | | −3.2% |
| 2000 | 13,996 | | 4.2% |
| 2010 | 13,782 | | −1.5% |
| 2020 | 13,943 | | 1.2% |
U.S. Decennial Census

As of the census of 2000, there were 13,996 people, 5,421 households, and 3,859 families residing in the town. The population density was 384.6 inhabitants per square mile (148.5/km^{2}). There were 5,686 housing units at an average density of 156.2 per square mile (60.3/km^{2}). The racial makeup of the town was 98.83% White, 0.18% African American, 0.04% Native American, 0.36% Asian, 0.01% Pacific Islander, 0.11% from other races, and 0.47% from two or more races. Hispanic or Latino of any race were 0.59% of the population.

There were 5,421 households, out of which 33.4% had children under the age of 18 living with them, 61.2% were married couples living together, 7.2% had a female householder with no husband present, and 28.8% were non-families. 25.8% of all households were made up of individuals, and 11.9% had someone living alone who was 65 years of age or older. The average household size was 2.51 and the average family size was 3.03.

In the town, the population was spread out, with 25.4% under the age of 18, 5.1% from 18 to 24, 27.0% from 25 to 44, 25.7% from 45 to 64, and 16.8% who were 65 years of age or older. The median age was 41 years. For every 100 females, there were 93.7 males. For every 100 females age 18 and over, there were 90.1 males.

The median income for a household in the town was $51,939, and the median income for a family was $63,550. Males had a median income of $46,269 versus $30,000 for females. The per capita income for the town was $24,530. About 2.2% of families and 3.6% of the population were below the poverty line, including 3.3% of those under age 18 and 2.9% of those age 65 or over.

== Communities and locations in Aurora ==
- Billington Heights – A small, 1955-era housing development shared with Elma
- Blakeley – A hamlet in the southeastern part of the town.
- Cazenovia Creek (West and East Branches) – Both branches of Cazenovia Creek flow northward through the town.
- East Aurora – The Village of East Aurora is in the northeast part of the town.
- Emery Park - An Erie County Park located in the southeast part of town.
- Gow School – Portions of the school are located in the southeast part of the town.
- Griffins Mills – A community in the southwestern part of the town on the West Branch of Cazenovia Creek.
- Jewettville – A location in the southwest corner of the town on NY-240.
- Knox Farm State Park – A park developed from the estate of the Knox family in 2000.
- South Wales – A hamlet shared between Aurora and the town of Wales.
- West Falls – A hamlet in the southwest corner of the town on the West Branch of Cazenovia Creek and NY-240.
