= Aurora, New York =

Aurora is the name of two places in the U.S. state of New York:

- Aurora, Cayuga County, New York (a village)
- Aurora, Erie County, New York (a town)
