= Colden Mansion Ruins =

Historic ruins in New York, United States

- U.S. National Register of Historic Places
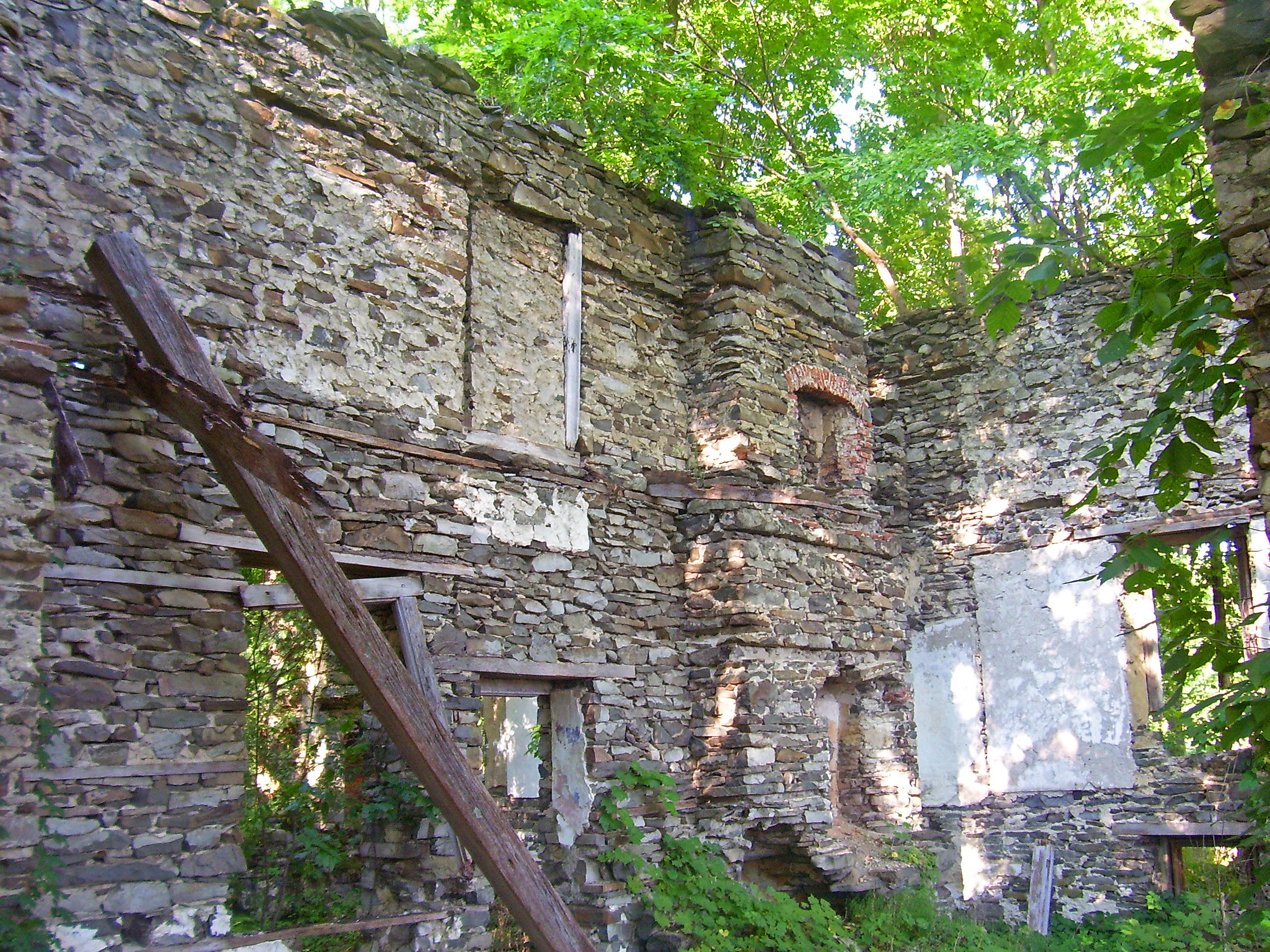
- Ruins in 2007
- Location: Town of Montgomery, New York, United States
- Nearest city: Newburgh
- Coordinates: 41°31′35″N 74°08′02″W
- Area: 8 acres (3 ha)
- Built: 1767
- NRHP reference No.: 07000758
- Added to NRHP: 2007

The Colden Mansion Ruins are located in the Town of Montgomery, New York, United States, along NY 17K, at the intersection of Stone Castle Road and Route 17K. The stone walls and foundations, still visible in the woods just off the road, are all that still stands from the house built in 1767 by Cadwallader Colden Jr., son of Cadwallader Colden, and his wife Elizabeth Ellison of New Windsor. The entire area, once the 3,000-acre (12 km^{2}) family farm, is still known as Coldenham and East Coldenham, and the Colden Family Cemetery is approximately a mile (1.6 km) to the southwest.

The Colden family owned the house until the mid-19th century when they sold it. In 1940, the Metropolitan Museum of Art acquired some of the original wooden paneling which is now displayed in the museum's Verplanck Room. In the 1930s, the house was abandoned after a probate lawsuit, and in the later years of the 20th century, it fell into its present state of disrepair.

The site was one of the first properties identified by the town when it enacted its first local historic preservation ordinance in 1997. In 2000, the town added it to its own listing of historic properties.

The site was added to the National Register of Historic Places in 2007, after the construction of Route 747 nearby and the completion of other Stewart Airport access improvements, including the re-routing of the southern end of Stone Castle Road a hundred feet (30 m) westward, away from the ruins, to form a four-way intersection with 747.

As part of that construction, the state acquired the mansion property and turned it over to the town, which wants to make the area a park. It is exploring grant opportunities to preserve the property.

== Gallery ==
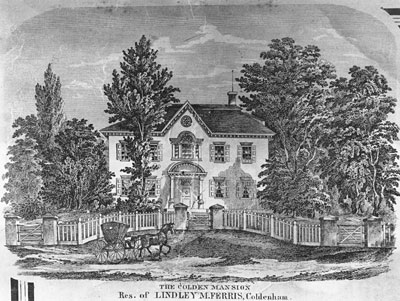
1859 engraving; earliest known depiction of the house.

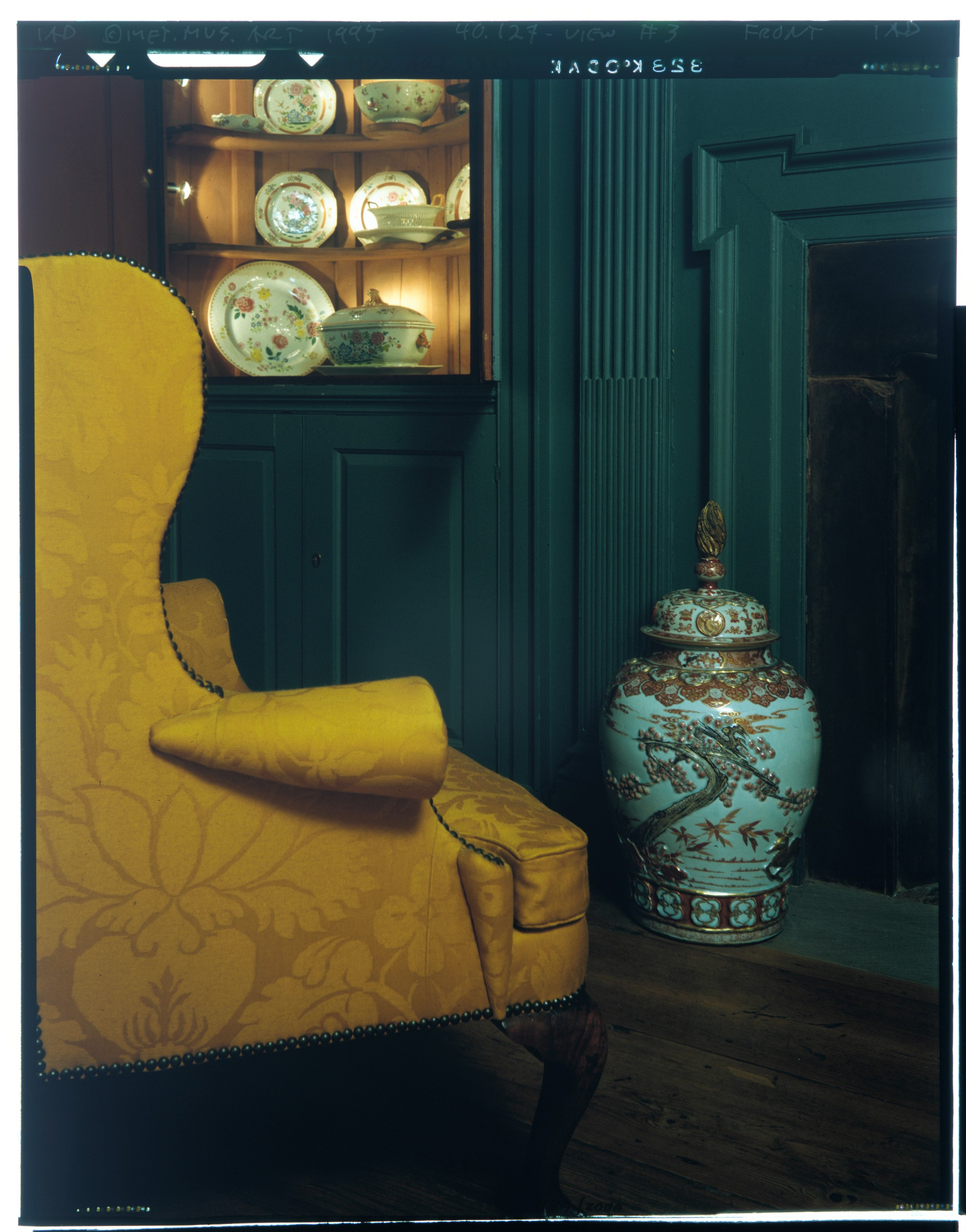
Woodwork on display at the Metropolitan Museum of Art
