= Colden Family Cemetery =

Historic cemetery in Orange County, New York, US

- U.S. National Register of Historic Places
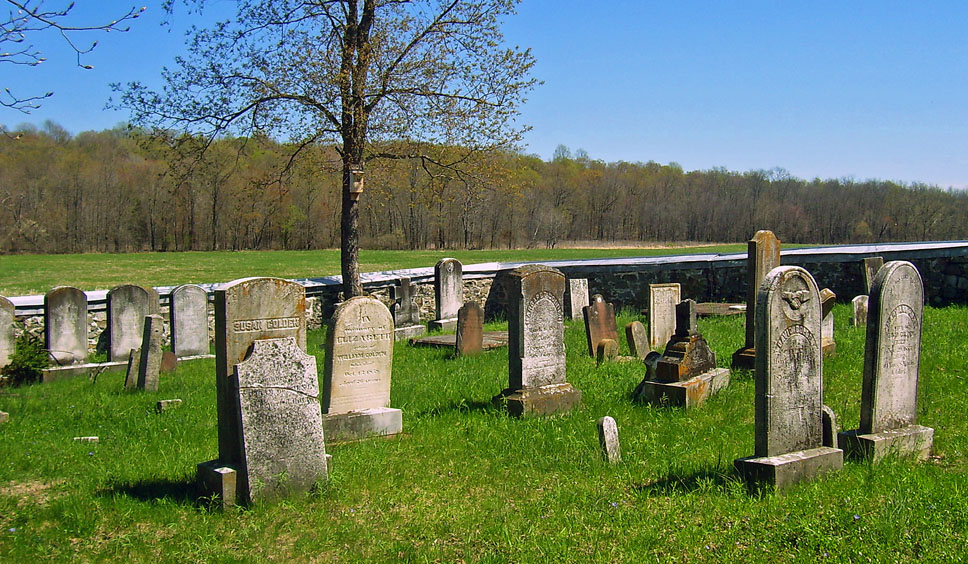
- View over the cemetery from northwest corner

- Location within New York Location within the United States
- Location: Off of Maple Ave., Town of Montgomery, New York
- Nearest city: Newburgh
- Coordinates: 41.5216°N 74.1454°W
- Area: less than one acre
- NRHP reference No.: 05000017
- Added to NRHP: February 9, 2005

The Colden Family Cemetery (also known as Colden Cemetery) is a Registered Historic Place in the Town of Montgomery in Orange County, New York, United States. It is located off Maple Avenue south of NY 17K, surrounded by a small stone wall.

It was established in the 1780s by the descendants of area resident Cadwallader Colden, one of the last colonial governors of New York. The ruins of the family home are at the junction of 17K and NY 747, approximately a mile (1.6 km) to the northeast. While Colden himself is buried another private cemetery in the Queens community of Flushing where he died, a tablet was erected in his memory at the entrance. Many of his progeny are here, along with some of the family's slaves and members of other families. The earliest grave is that of his last wife Elizabeth, who died in 1782. The most recent grave is that of Anna Colden Harris, who died in 1937.

The cemetery was added to the National Register of Historic Places in 2005.

== See also ==
- List of cemeteries in New York
- National Register of Historic Places listings in Orange County, New York
