= Wales, New York =

- Town
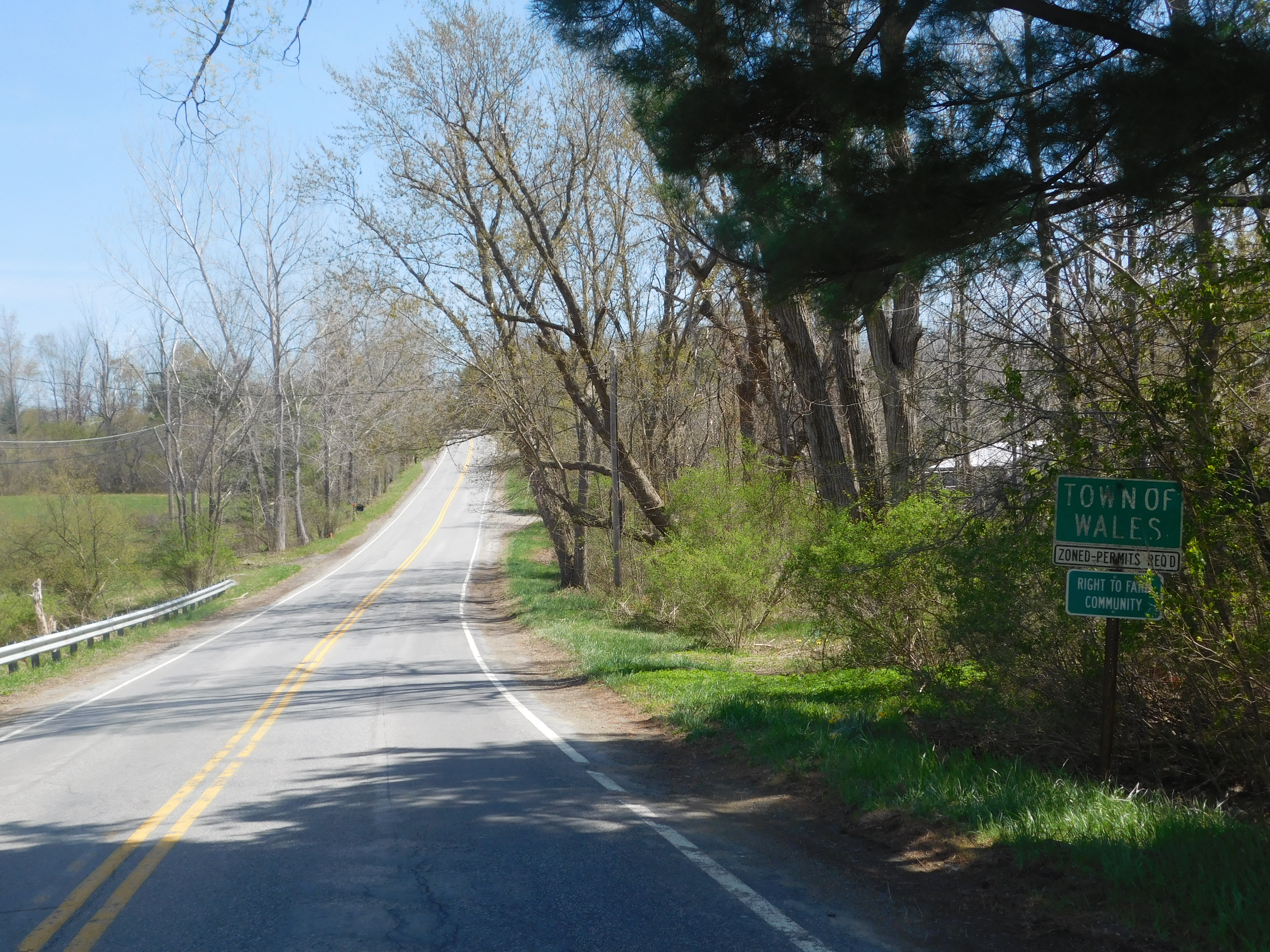
- County Route 175 eastbound entering Wales.
- Motto: "Great Country Living"
- Location in Erie County and the state of New York.
- Coordinates: 42°43′46″N 78°31′11″W
- Country: United States
- State: New York
- County: Erie
- Named for: Wales

Government
  - Type: Town Council
  - Town Supervisor: Tim Howard (R)
  - Town Council: Members list: • Gerald Klinck (R); • Donald Butcher (R); • Michael Simon (R); • Jude Hartrich (R)

Area
  - Total: 35.64 sq mi (92.30 km^{2})
  - Land: 35.59 sq mi (92.17 km^{2})
  - Water: 0.050 sq mi (0.13 km^{2})
- Elevation: 1,335 ft (407 m)

Population (2020)
  - Total: 3,009
  - Density: 84/sq mi (32.6/km^{2})
- Time zone: UTC-5 (Eastern (EST))
  - Summer (DST): UTC-4 (EDT)
- ZIP codes: 14169 (Wales Center); 14139 (South Wales); 14052 (East Aurora); 14037 (Cowlesville); 14145 (Strykersville)
- Area code(s): 716/624
- FIPS code: 36-029-77871
- GNIS feature ID: 0979591
- Website: www.townofwalesny.gov

Wales is a town in Erie County, New York, United States. The town is one of the "Southtowns" of Erie County by virtue of its position in the southeast part of the county, southeast of Buffalo. As of the 2020 census the town had a population of 3,009. It is part of the Buffalo-Niagara Falls metropolitan area.

== History ==
The town was formed in 1818 from the town of Willink.

Originally a farming community, the town of Wales is documented through profiles of its churches, civic organizations, businesses, and individual citizens. Established in 1818, the town of 3,000 residents is located in a scenic area of Erie County amid woodlands and streams. Town boards over the years have been respectful of the residents' desire to maintain a small-town atmosphere and quality of life, and the transition to modern life has emphasized small, family-oriented businesses. Personal commitment and a spirit of volunteerism have prevailed in the community, as evidenced by its many interactive organizations.

The town is named because its hills and green fields reminded settlers of the nation of Wales.

== Geography ==
According to the United States Census Bureau, the town has a total area of 35.6 square miles (92.3 km^{2}), of which 35.6 square miles (92.2 km^{2}) is land and 0.04 square miles (0.1 km^{2}), or 0.14%, is water.

The east town line is the border of Wyoming County.

New York State Route 400 begins in South Wales near the southwest part of the town. Route 20A is an east-west road in the town. Route 16 is a north-south road in the southwest part of town. New York State Route 78 is an east-west road in the center of town.

The East Branch of Cazenovia Creek flows northward in the southwest corner of town.

== Climate ==
According to the Köppen Climate Classification system, Wales has a warm-summer humid continental climate, abbreviated "Dfb" on climate maps. The hottest temperature recorded in Wales was 95 °F (35.0 °C) on July 10, 2020, and July 17, 2022, while the coldest temperature recorded was −19 °F (−28.3 °C) on December 13, 1988, and February 14–15, 2016.

Climate data for Wales, New York, 1991–2020 normals, extremes 1949–present
Month	Jan	Feb	Mar	Apr	May	Jun	Jul	Aug	Sep	Oct	Nov	Dec	Year
Record high °F (°C)	66 (19)	72 (22)	82 (28)	89 (32)	92 (33)	92 (33)	95 (35)	94 (34)	90 (32)	84 (29)	79 (26)	68 (20)	95 (35)
Mean maximum °F (°C)	55.7 (13.2)	54.3 (12.4)	65.6 (18.7)	78.9 (26.1)	83.3 (28.5)	86.6 (30.3)	87.7 (30.9)	86.8 (30.4)	84.9 (29.4)	77.3 (25.2)	67.8 (19.9)	57.0 (13.9)	89.3 (31.8)
Mean daily maximum °F (°C)	31.5 (−0.3)	33.1 (0.6)	41.6 (5.3)	55.3 (12.9)	67.0 (19.4)	74.9 (23.8)	78.8 (26.0)	77.7 (25.4)	71.6 (22.0)	59.5 (15.3)	47.4 (8.6)	36.7 (2.6)	56.3 (13.5)
Daily mean °F (°C)	23.4 (−4.8)	24.2 (−4.3)	31.9 (−0.1)	44.2 (6.8)	55.7 (13.2)	64.5 (18.1)	68.4 (20.2)	67.1 (19.5)	60.7 (15.9)	49.7 (9.8)	39.1 (3.9)	29.5 (−1.4)	46.5 (8.1)
Mean daily minimum °F (°C)	15.4 (−9.2)	15.2 (−9.3)	22.2 (−5.4)	33.1 (0.6)	44.2 (6.8)	54.0 (12.2)	57.9 (14.4)	56.5 (13.6)	49.7 (9.8)	39.8 (4.3)	30.8 (−0.7)	22.3 (−5.4)	36.8 (2.6)
Mean minimum °F (°C)	−7.1 (−21.7)	−4.3 (−20.2)	2.6 (−16.3)	20.6 (−6.3)	29.9 (−1.2)	39.7 (4.3)	46.6 (8.1)	45.1 (7.3)	35.8 (2.1)	26.2 (−3.2)	14.9 (−9.5)	3.6 (−15.8)	−10.2 (−23.4)
Record low °F (°C)	−18 (−28)	−19 (−28)	−12 (−24)	9 (−13)	25 (−4)	31 (−1)	40 (4)	35 (2)	26 (−3)	21 (−6)	0 (−18)	−19 (−28)	−19 (−28)
Average precipitation inches (mm)	3.56 (90)	2.65 (67)	3.16 (80)	3.58 (91)	3.50 (89)	4.15 (105)	3.94 (100)	3.48 (88)	3.93 (100)	4.18 (106)	4.05 (103)	3.90 (99)	44.08 (1,118)
Average snowfall inches (cm)	32.9 (84)	19.9 (51)	17.0 (43)	3.6 (9.1)	0.0 (0.0)	0.0 (0.0)	0.0 (0.0)	0.0 (0.0)	0.0 (0.0)	0.2 (0.51)	9.1 (23)	26.6 (68)	109.3 (278.61)
Average extreme snow depth inches (cm)	15.9 (40)	13.6 (35)	12.0 (30)	2.7 (6.9)	0.0 (0.0)	0.0 (0.0)	0.0 (0.0)	0.0 (0.0)	0.0 (0.0)	0.2 (0.51)	7.3 (19)	11.1 (28)	19.7 (50)
Average precipitation days (≥ 0.01 in)	18.2	14.6	13.3	13.5	12.3	12.2	11.1	10.5	10.6	12.9	13.4	16.7	159.3
Average snowy days (≥ 0.1 in)	13.2	11.0	7.1	2.2	0.0	0.0	0.0	0.0	0.0	0.1	4.1	10.1	47.8
Source 1: NOAA
Source 2: National Weather Service

== Demographics ==
Historical population
Census	Pop.	Note	%±
1820	903		—
1830	1,500		66.1%
1840	1,987		32.5%
1850	2,124		6.9%
1860	1,710		−19.5%
1870	1,416		−17.2%
1880	1,302		−8.1%
1890	1,200		−7.8%
1900	1,220		1.7%
1910	1,203		−1.4%
1920	985		−18.1%
1930	1,086		10.3%
1940	1,198		10.3%
1950	1,370		14.4%
1960	1,910		39.4%
1970	2,617		37.0%
1980	2,844		8.7%
1990	2,917		2.6%
2000	2,960		1.5%
2010	3,005		1.5%
2020	3,009		0.1%
U.S. Decennial Census

As of the census of 2000, there were 2,960 people, 1,116 households, and 841 families residing in the town. The population density was 83.1 inhabitants per square mile (32.1/km^{2}). There were 1,165 housing units at an average density of 32.7 per square mile (12.6/km^{2}). The racial makeup of the town was 98.58% White, 0.10% African American, 0.37% Native American, 0.37% Asian, 0.20% from other races, and 0.37% from two or more races. Hispanic or Latino of any race were 0.74% of the population.

There were 1,116 households, out of which 34.6% had children under the age of 18 living with them, 64.3% were married couples living together, 7.2% had a female householder with no husband present, and 24.6% were non-families. 19.8% of all households were made up of individuals, and 8.2% had someone living alone who was 65 years of age or older. The average household size was 2.65 and the average family size was 3.07.

In the town, the population was spread out, with 24.9% under the age of 18, 6.4% from 18 to 24, 29.3% from 25 to 44, 27.8% from 45 to 64, and 11.6% who were 65 years of age or older. The median age was 39 years. For every 100 females, there were 98.1 males. For every 100 females age 18 and over, there were 97.9 males.

The median income for a household in the town was $51,486, and the median income for a family was $59,350. Males had a median income of $40,125 versus $29,737 for females. The per capita income for the town was $21,616. About 2.1% of families and 3.6% of the population were below the poverty line, including 4.0% of those under age 18 and 3.5% of those age 65 or over.

== Notable people ==
- Alice Moore Hubbard, American feminist, writer, and, with her husband, Elbert Hubbard was a leading figure in the Roycroft movement
- John James Knowlton, former Wisconsin State Assemblyman
- Wally Schang, a catcher in major league baseball from 1913 to 1931. Schang Rd. in Wales named after him
- Adoniram J. Warner, former US Congressman, Union Army General in American Civil War

== Communities and locations in Wales ==
- Buffalo Creek – A stream flowing northward through the town.
- Colgrave – A location on Centerline Road in the western part of the town.
- Goodleburg Cemetery – A cemetery located in the town.
- South Wales – A hamlet on the border of the town of Aurora in the southeast part of Wales. This community lies at the south end of NY-400 on NY-16 and is the home of the Gow School.
- Wales Center – A hamlet near the northern town border.
- Wales Hollow (or "Woods Hollow") – A location near the town's eastern edge.
- Sgt. Mark A. Rademacher Memorial Park, commonly known as Hunters Creek Park, managed by the Erie County Department of Parks, Recreation and Forestry, is located in Wales.

== See also ==
- Iroquois Central School District
