= Wales Center, New York =

- Hamlet
- Location within New York Location within the United States
- Coordinates: 42°46′06″N 78°31′48″W
- Country: United States
- State: New York
- County: Erie
- Elevation: 889 ft (271 m)
- Time zone: UTC-5 (Eastern (EST))
  - Summer (DST): UTC-4 (EDT)
- ZIP code: 14169
- Area code: 716
- GNIS feature ID: 968671

Wales Center is a hamlet in Erie County, New York, United States. The community is located along U.S. Route 20A, 4.2 miles (6.8 km) east of East Aurora. Wales Center has a post office with ZIP code 14169, which opened on November 9, 1842. It is part of the Buffalo-Niagara Falls metropolitan area.

The hamlet is covered by the Iroquois Central School District.

Sgt. Mark A. Rademacher Memorial Park, commonly known as Hunters Creek Park, managed by the Erie County Department of Parks, Recreation and Forestry, is located in the hamlet. The park is 756 acres in size.
