= Willink, New York =

Willink, New York (sometimes "Willinck") is a former town in Western New York, United States. The name was derived from Willem Willink, one of the original investors of the Holland Land Company.

Willink was originally formed in Genesee County, from the Town of Batavia in 1804, before becoming part of Niagara County in 1808. When Erie County was formed from the south part of Niagara County, Willink became the south part of that new county. Willink already had been divided to form the towns of Cambria and Clarence in 1808, Clarence forming the northern part of the yet created Erie County.

New towns continued to be formed from Willink until 1818, when Holland and Wales were the last to be partitioned. The citizens of the remaining portion of Willink voted to change the town's name to Aurora, effective the same date as the formation of Holland and Wales.

The village of Willink continued to exist and incorporated in 1849, but eventually was renamed East Aurora. In 1874 the village disincorporated, but a post office remained at the west end of the new village of East Aurora until 1913, when it was consolidated with the East Aurora Post Office.

== Towns and villages derived from the Town of Willink ==
=== Towns ===
- Cambria (1808)
  - Hartland (from Cambria, 1812)
    - Royalton (from Hartland, 1817)
    - Somerset (from Hartland, 1823)
  - Niagara (from Cambria, 1812)
    - Pendleton (from Niagara, 1827)
    - Wheatfield (from Niagara, 1836)
  - Porter (from Cambria, 1812)
    - Wilson (from Porter, 1818)
  - Lewiston (from Cambria, 1818)
- Clarence (1808)
  - Lancaster (from Clarence, 1833)
- Concord (1812)
  - Collins (from Concord, 1821)
    - North Collins (from Collins, 1852)
  - Sardinia (from Concord, 1821)
- Eden (1812)
  - Boston (from Eden, 1817)
  - Evans (from Eden, 1821)
- Hamburg (1812)
  - Ellicott (now Orchard Park) (from Hamburg, 1850)
- Holland (1818)
  - Collins (from Holland, 1827)
- Wales (1818)
  - Marilla (from Wales (part), 1853)
- Aurora (remaining part of Willink, renamed in 1818)

Towns formed from multiple "children" towns of Willink include:

- Lockport (from Cambria and Royalton, 1824)
- Newfane (from Hartland, Somerset, and Wilson, 1824)
- West Seneca (from Ellicott, Hamburg, Lancaster and Cheektowaga, 1851)
- Brant (from Collins and Evans, 1852)
- Elma (from Aurora and Lancaster, 1857)

=== Villages ===
- Angola
- Blasdell
- East Aurora
- Farnham
- Gowanda, in part
- Hamburg
- North Collins
- Orchard Park
- Springville
