= Goodleburg Cemetery =

Cemetery in New York state, US

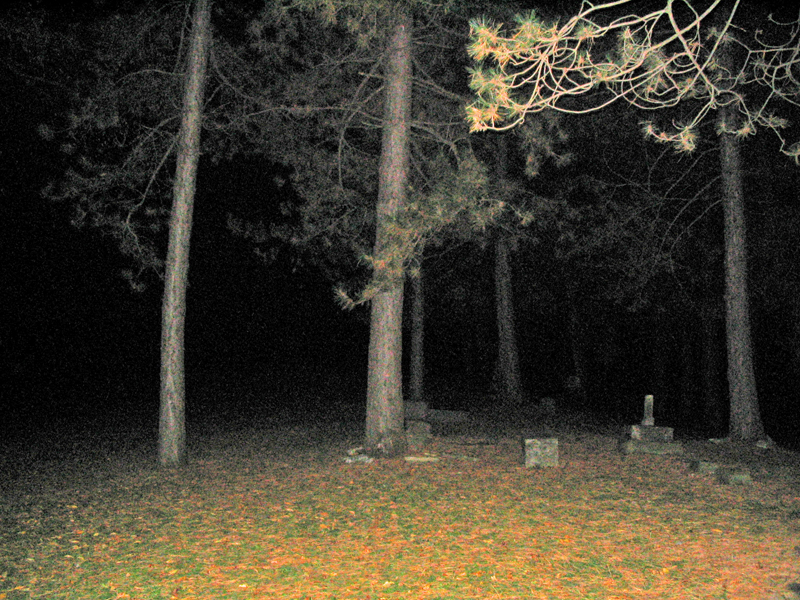
- Goodleburg Cemetery
- Interactive map of Goodleburg Cemetery

Details
- Established: 1811
- Location: South Wales, NY
- Country: United States
- Coordinates: 42.7139°N 78.5378°W
- Type: Not private
- Owned by: Town of Wales, NY
- Size: 1.5
- Find a Grave: Goodleburg Cemetery

Goodleburg Cemetery is a cemetery located in South Wales, New York. It is an old, inactive village lot whose use has been discontinued. Many of the original settlers of Wales and the surrounding areas are buried here.

== History ==
Goodleberg Cemetery was an active cemetery from 1811 until 1927. The cemetery stood relatively peacefully until the late 1990s, when stories spread about ghost stories and ghastly apparitions. Various paranormal research organizations, intent on capturing the paranormal activities at Goodleberg paraded carloads of investigators from neighboring counties, intent on capturing evidence of the paranormal.

== Folklore ==
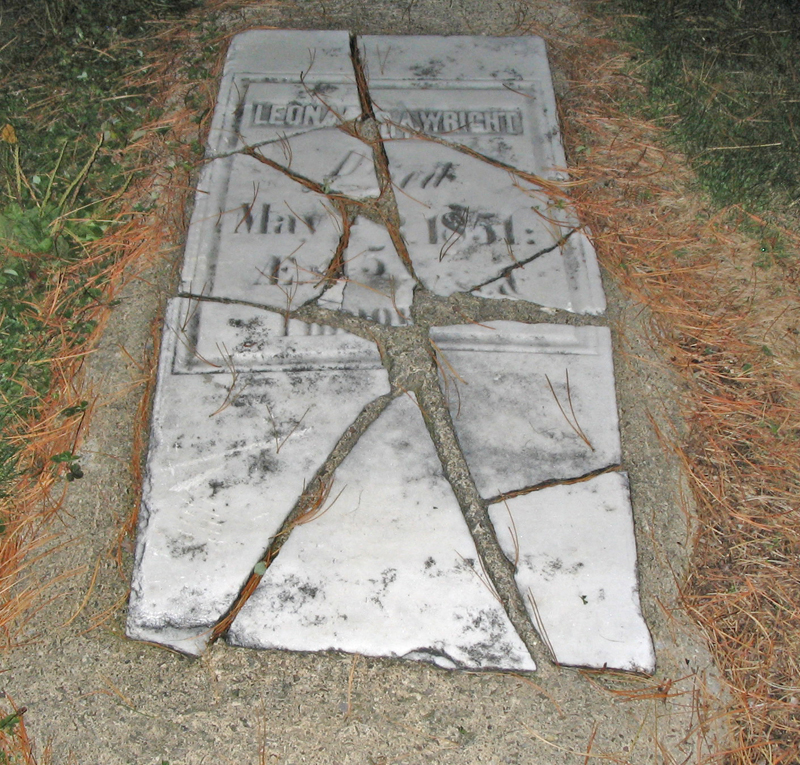
A vandalized headstone at Goodleburg Cemetery

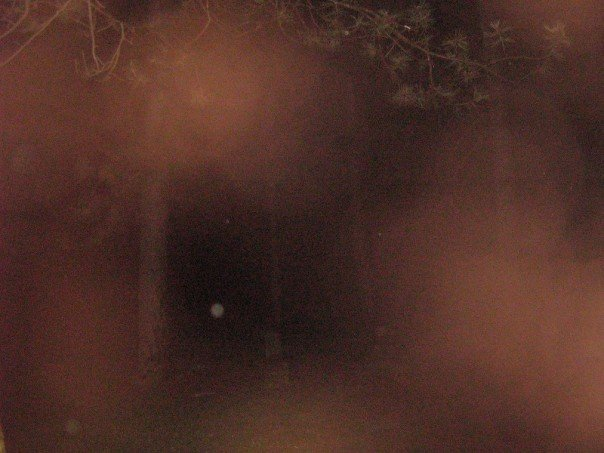
Photo taken in Goodleburg Cemetery in May 2007 showing colored orbs anthropomorphizing a demonic figure

In recent years, it has been a site of frequent desecration.

Paranormal author Mason Winfield has written about this cemetery and its purported activity several times, but has also expressed regret to writing anything about it due to the spike in vandalism since then.
