= Emery Park =

Park in Erie County, New York

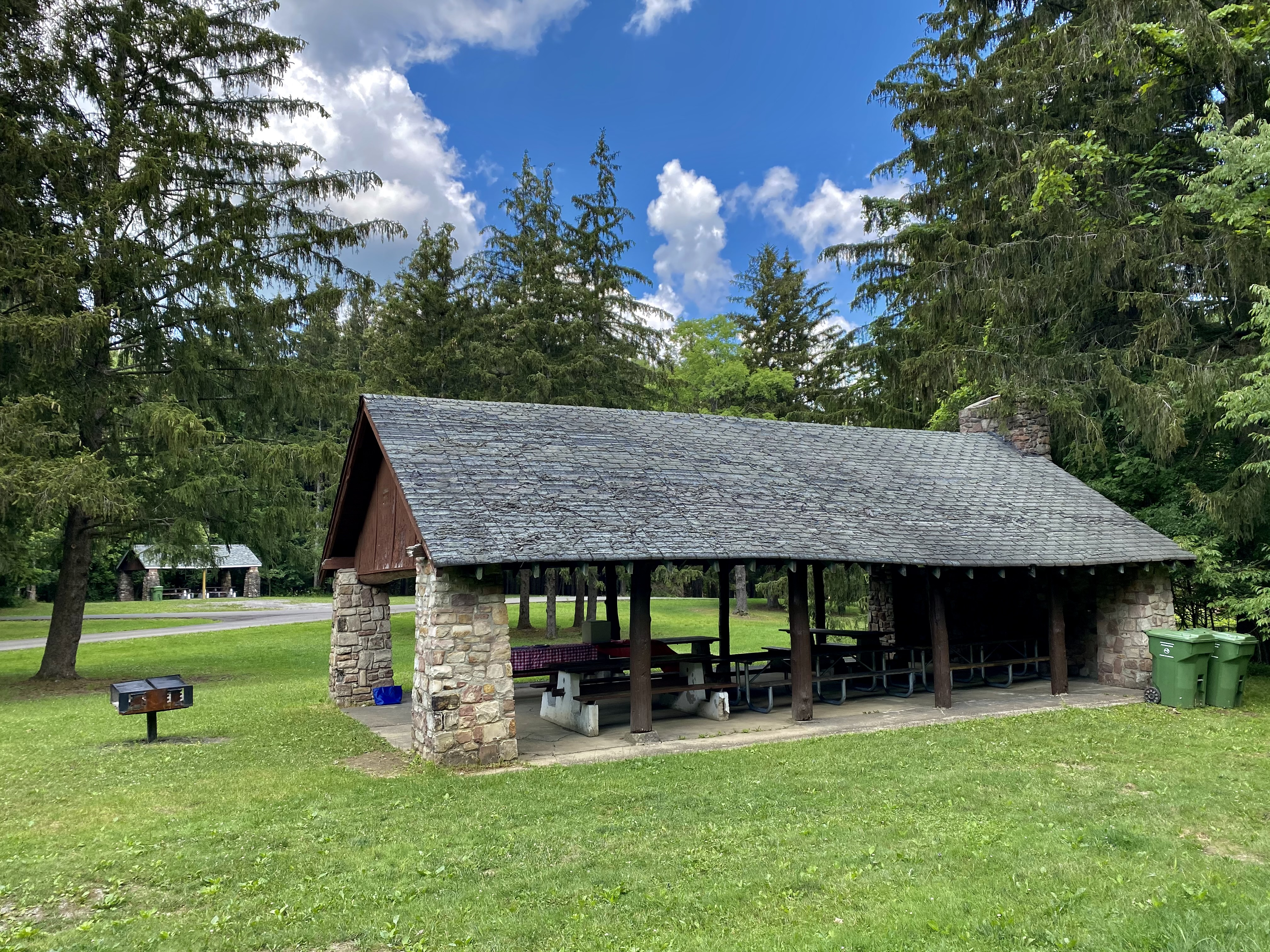
- Picnic Shelter

- Location within New York
- Type: Regional park
- Location: 2084 Emery Road; South Wales, New York
- Nearest city: Buffalo, New York
- Coordinates: 42°42′52″N 78°35′43″W
- Area: 490 acres (2.0 km^{2})
- Created: 1925
- Operator: Erie County Department of Parks, Recreation and Forestry
- Open: All year
- Website: Emery Park

Emery Park is a 490-acre (2.0 km^{2}) park in Erie County, in the U.S. state of New York. The park is located in the hamlet of South Wales, southeast of the city of Buffalo. It is operated by the Erie County Department of Parks, Recreation and Forestry. Access is free and it is open to the public year-round.

== History ==
Emery Park was among the four original parks acquired by Erie County in the 1920s. Several of the park's structures were part of a farmstead established by Josiah Emery in the early 1800s. In 1925, 175 acres (0.71 km^{2}) of land was purchased by Erie County from the Emery family to form Emery Park. The park's facilities and landscapes were improved substantially by the Works Progress Administration throughout the 1930s, and the park grew to 490 acres (2.0 km^{2}) through land acquisitions in the years that followed.

Despite improvements and repairs in recent years, Emery Park was described by Erie County officials as being in the worst shape of all of the county's parks as of 2013, when plans for additional repairs were announced. The planned demolition of the Emery Inn was reported in late 2013 due to safety concerns caused by the building's advanced state of deterioration. The structure was part of the original Emery farmstead, and had previously served as a museum and restaurant within the park before sitting vacant for many years.

== Attractions and facilities ==
- Two tributaries to Cazenovia Creek make their way through the park, forming scenic ravines and waterfalls. The 40-foot (12 m) Emery Falls and the 30-foot (9.1 m) North Emery Falls are accessible via trails on the park's property.
- Emery Park includes facilities and trails for several winter sports, including a Magic Carpet ski lift, installed in 2018-2019 (previously a T-bar lift) for skiing and snowboarding, and a 1.6-mile (2.6 km) cross-country skiing trail.
- The park also features facilities for baseball, softball, tennis, bicycling, hiking, picnicking, and disc golf.
- Electric vehicle (EV) chargers have been installed in the park.
