= East Aurora High School (New York) =

Location
- 1003 Center Street; East Aurora, (Erie County), New York 14052; United States
- 42.7350°N 78.6241°W

Information
- School type: Public school (government funded), high school
- Status: open
- School district: East Aurora Union Free School District
- NCES District ID: 3609540
- Superintendent: Brian Russ
- CEEB code: 331685
- NCES School ID: 360954000726
- Principal: William Roberts
- Teaching staff: 55.85 (FTE)
- Grades: 9–12
- Gender: Coeducational
- Enrollment: 542 (2024–2025)
- Student to teacher ratio: 9.70
- Hours in school day: 7
- Campus: Rural: fringe
- Colors: Blue and white
- Mascot: Blue Devils
- Website: www.eastauroraschools.org/o/district/page/high-school-landing

East Aurora High School is located in the town of Aurora, south of the village of East Aurora, Erie County, New York, United States. It is the only high school operated by the East Aurora Union Free School District.

East Aurora Schools have been recognized by the National Blue Ribbon Schools Program, administered by the U.S. Department of Education. The Middle School in 2012 and the High School in 2017.

The U.S. News & World Report ranked the East Aurora high school #2 in Buffalo, NY Metro Area High Schools.

== Academics ==
The high school offers the following Advanced Placement courses: Biology, Calculus, Chemistry, Computer Science Principles, Economics, English Language & Composition, English Literature & Composition, European History, Latin, Physics 1, Precalculus, Research, Seminar, Statistics, Studio Art, U.S. Government & Politics, U.S. History, World History.
