= South Wales, New York =

Coordinates: 42°42′32″N 78°34′41″W

South Wales
- Hamlet
- Interactive map of South Wales
- Country: United States
- State: New York
- County: Erie
- Towns: Aurora; Wales

Area
  - Hamlet: 1.54 sq mi (3.98 km^{2})
  - Urban: 0.54 sq mi (1.4 km^{2})
- Elevation: 928 ft (283 m)

South Wales is a hamlet in the towns of Aurora and Wales in Erie County, New York, United States. It is part of the Buffalo-Niagara Falls metropolitan area.

WGRZ's broadcast tower and in-house weather radar are based in the hamlet.

== Geography ==
New York State Route 400 begins in South Wales and ends at the New York State Thruway (Interstate 90) in Buffalo. New York State Route 16 is a north-south road in the hamlet.

The East Branch of Cazenovia Creek flows northward through the hamlet.

== Education ==
The hamlet is covered by the East Aurora Union Free School District, Holland Central School District, and the Iroquois Central School District.

The Gow School is a residential private school located in South Wales. It is for students, grades 6–12, with dyslexia and similar language-based learning disabilities.

== Recreation ==
Emery Park is a 457 acre park located in South Wales. The park is managed by the Erie County Department of Parks, Recreation and Forestry. The most recent Erie County Parks Master Plan was released in 2018.

== Notable people ==
- Wally Schang, former baseball catcher and member of the New York Yankees' first World Series title team in 1923.
- Frank Wright, Olympic sport shooter.
