= Wales Hollow, New York =

Hamlet in New York, United States

Coordinates: 42°44′33″N 78°29′18″W

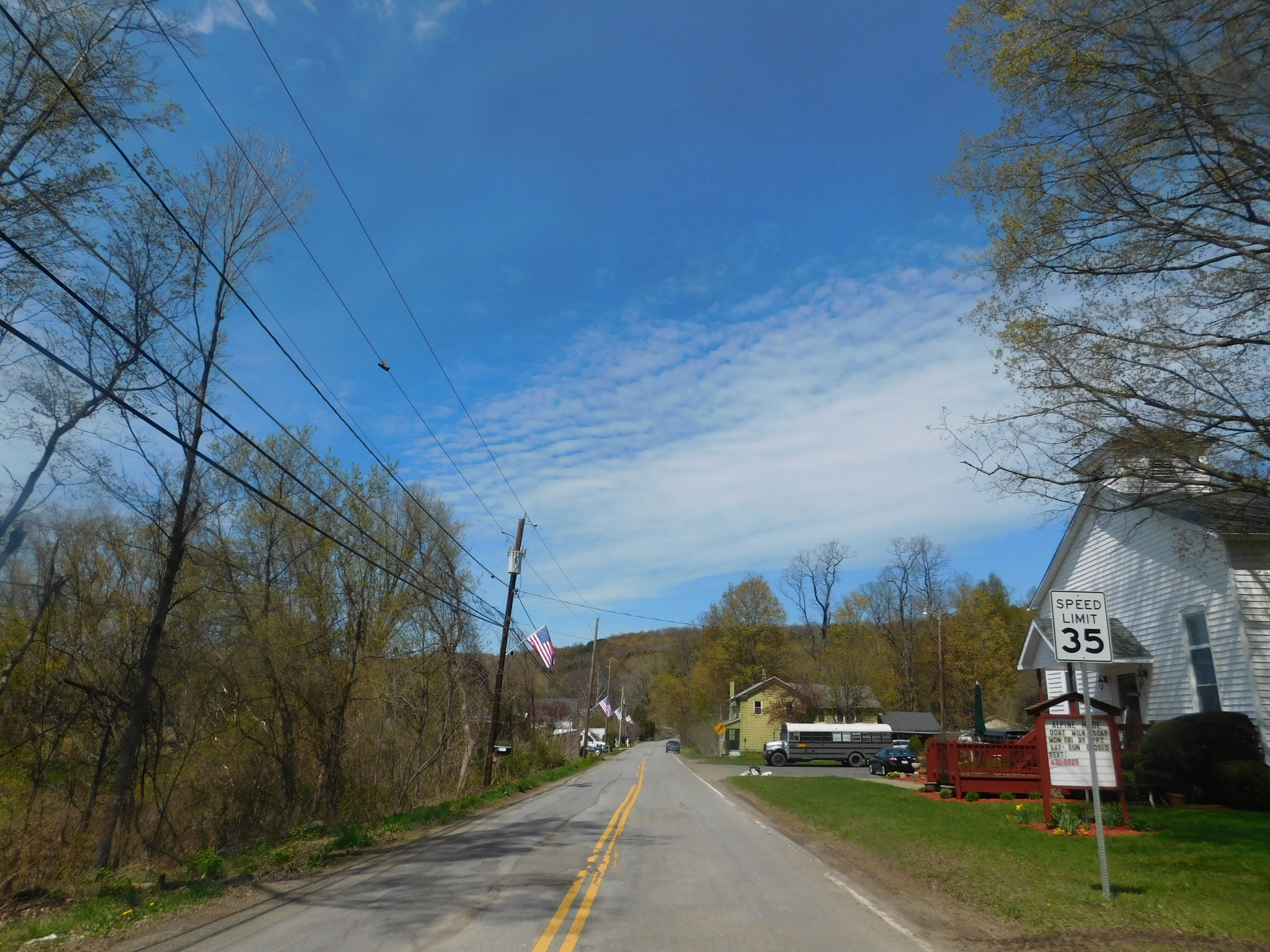
Wales Hollow in April 2021

Wales Hollow is a hamlet in the town of Wales in Erie County, New York, United States.
