= Sgt. Mark A. Rademacher Memorial Park =

Park in Erie County, New York

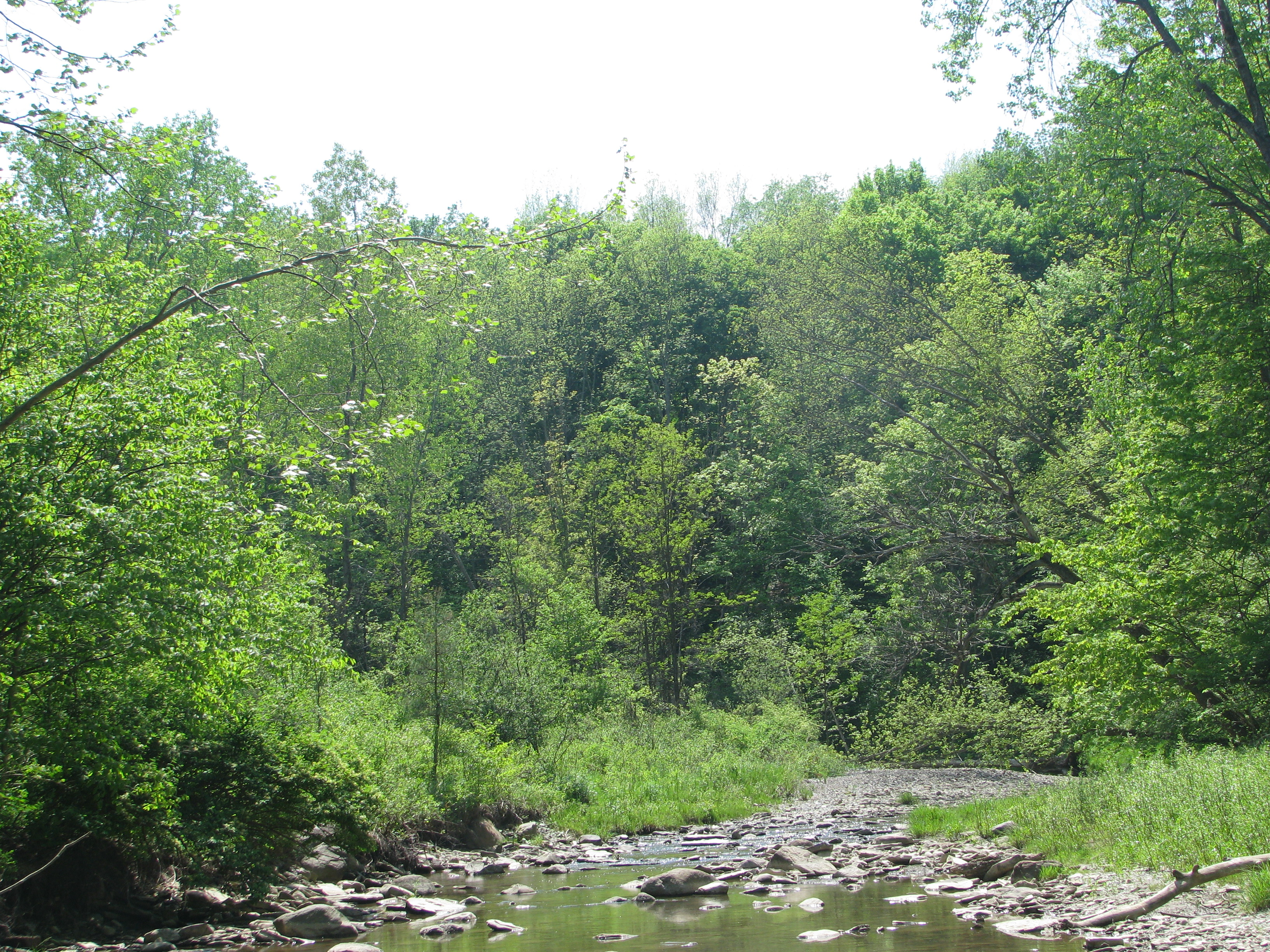

- Location within New York
- Type: Regional park
- Location: Town of Wales; Erie County, New York
- Nearest city: Lackawanna, New York
- Coordinates: 42°44′55″N 78°31′54″W
- Area: 760 acres (3.1 km^{2})
- Operator: Erie County Department of Parks, Recreation and Forestry
- Open: All year

Sgt. Mark A. Rademacher Memorial Park, commonly known as Hunters Creek Park, is a 760-acre (3.1 km^{2}) park located in the Town of Wales in the U.S. state of New York. The park is operated by Erie County Department of Parks, Recreation and Forestry, and is a popular destination for hiking, mountain biking and horseback riding.

According to the 2003 Erie County Parks System Master Plan, Hunters Creek Park is classified as a conservation park. These parks are managed primarily for conservation of the natural environment and passive nature-based outdoor recreation activities, and are intended to generally remain in a natural state.

The largely-undeveloped park sits upon land purchased by Erie County in the 1970s. The park was renamed "Sgt. Mark A. Rademacher Memorial Park" in 1983 in honor of a 20-year-old US Army Ranger from the Town of Wales who died in the Invasion of Grenada.
