= West Hill Cemetery, Sherburne =

Historic cemetery in Chenango County, New York, US

- West Hill Cemetery
- U.S. National Register of Historic Places
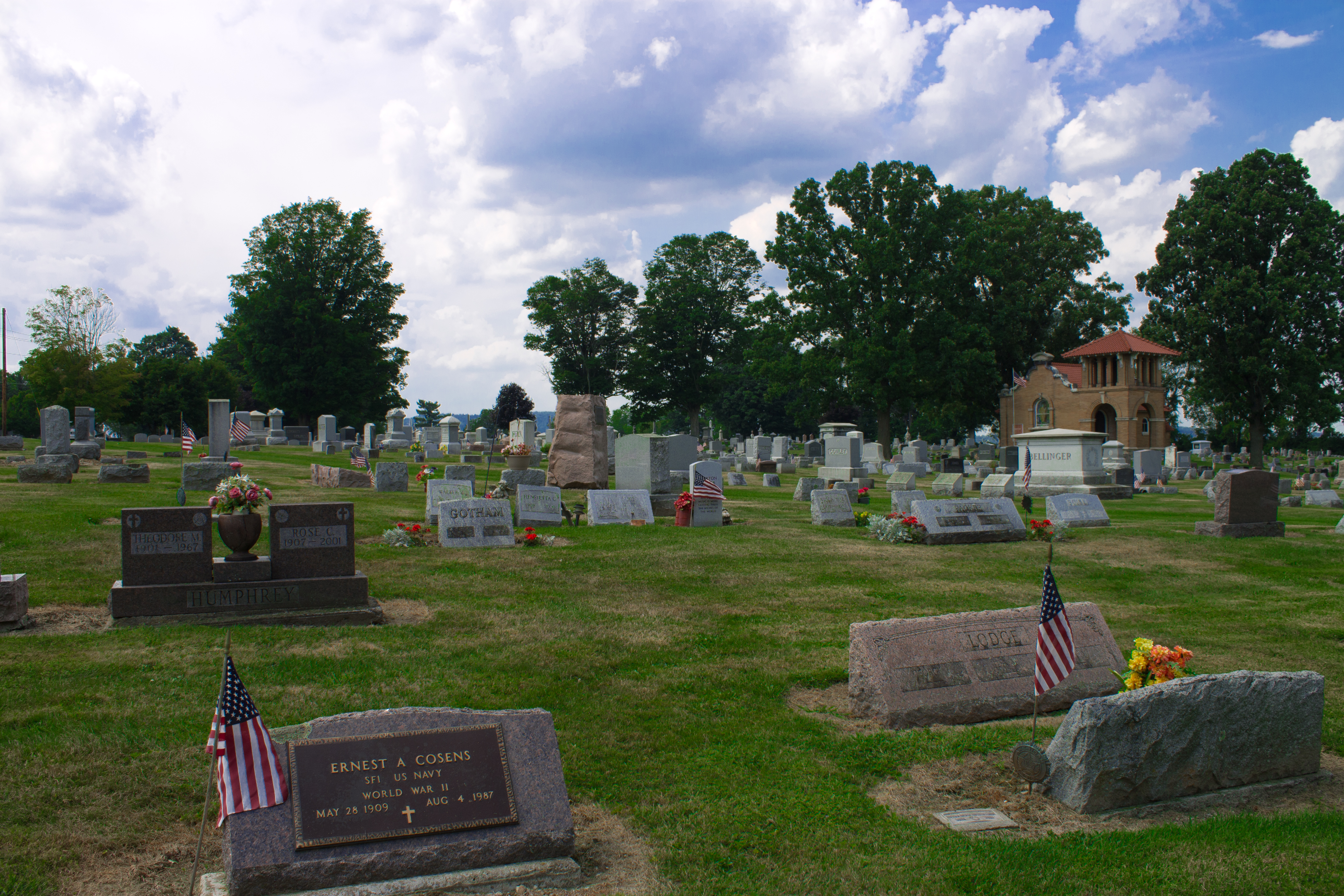
- West Hill Cemetery in 2012

- Location within New York Location within the United States
- Nearest city: Sherburne, New York
- Coordinates: 42°41′39″N 75°31′53″W
- Area: 9.4 acres (3.8 ha)
- Built: 1905
- Architect: Jaerschky, F.A.
- NRHP reference No.: 05001534
- Added to NRHP: January 18, 2006

West Hill Cemetery (also called Sherburne West Hill Cemetery) is a historic cemetery at Sherburne in Chenango County, New York. The cemetery contains over 4,500 burials, two thirds of which predate 1950. The earliest burial dates to 1803. The cemetery includes a small, one story brick chapel built in 1905.

Col. William Stephens Smith (1755–1816), US Representative and son-in-law of President John Adams is buried here.

The cemetery was added to the National Register of Historic Places in 2006.
