= Iroquois Central School District =

School district in Buffalo, New York, United States

Location
- Elma, New York

District information
- Grades: K-13
- Superintendent: Doug Scofield
- Schools: 6

Students and staff
- District mascot: Red Hawks

Other information
- Website: Iroquois Central School District

The Iroquois Central School District is a large school district about 14 miles (23 km) outside of Buffalo, New York that consists of about 84 square miles (220 km^{2}) of land in the towns of Elma, Marilla, Wales, Aurora, Lancaster, and Bennington. The district consists of about 2,895 students in six schools. The superintendent of schools is Douglas Scofield. The district was founded in 1955.

== Administration ==
The District offices are located at 2111 Girdle Road in Elma. The current Superintendent is Douglas Scofield.

=== Administrators ===
- Douglas Scofield–Superintendent
- Peter Dobmeier–Assistant Superintendent for Curriculum & Instruction
- John Wolski–Business Administrator
- David Sellan–Director of Human Resources
- Christian Hershey–Director of Student Services & Assessment

=== Board of Education ===
- David Lowrey–President
- Heather Becker–Vice-President
- Todd Aichinger
- Katelyn Letizia
- Jim Michalek
- Lisa Starr
- Keith Vergien

=== Selected former superintendents ===
Previous assignment and reason for departure denoted in parentheses

- Merton Haynes, PhD–1970-1988.
- Michael A. Glover–1994-2003 (Superintendent - Waterville Central School District, named Superintendent of Genesee Valley BOCES)
- James Knowles [interim]–2002-2003 (Principal - Iroquois High School, retired)
- Neil A. Rochelle–2003-2010 (Superintendent - Keshequa Central School District, named Program Coordinator for Guam Department of Education)
- Bruce Fraser–2010-2011 [interim] (Superintendent - Lockport City School District, retired)

== Iroquois High School ==
Iroquois High School

Location
- 2111 Girdle Road; Elma, Erie, New York 14059

Information
- NCES School ID: 361536001294
- Principal: Christopher Ginestre
- Grades: 9-12
- Colors: Red & White
- Website: Iroquois High School

Iroquois High School is located at 2111 Girdle Road and serves grades 9 through 12. The current principal is Dr. Christopher Ginestre, and the current assistant principals are Ms. Eryn Morris and Ms. Jessica Karnes.

=== History ===
==== Selected former principals ====
Previous assignment and reason for departure denoted with in parentheses

- Thomas L. Schnepper–1970-1991 (Asst. Principal - Niles Township High School - Skokie, Illinois; retired).
- Richard A. Marotto–1990-1997 (Principal - Lewiston-Porter High School, retired)
- James L. Knowles–1997-2002 (Social Studies teacher/Athletic Director - Iroquois High School, named Interim Superintendent of Iroquois Central School District)
- Robert A. Coniglio–2002-2005 (Assistant Principal - Iroquois High School, named Assistant Principal of Pioneer High School)
- Dennis G. Kenney–2005-2017 (Superintendent - Perry Central School District, retired)
- Dean Ramirez–2017-2021 (Principal - Lewiston-Porter Middle School, named Assistant Superintendent of Orchard Park Central School District)

Athletics

Iroquois, a wrestling powerhouse in the 1950s and '60s, established a then-national record for consecutive wins. The streak (1957-1967) reached 150 matches.

== Iroquois Middle School ==
Iroquois Middle School

Location
- 2111 Girdle Road; Elma, Erie, New York 14059

Information
- Principal: Ross Esslinger
- Grades: 6-8
- Website: Iroquois Middle School

Iroquois Middle School is located at 2111 Girdle Road and serves grades 6, 7, and 8. The current principal is Mr. Ross Esslinger and the current assistant principal is Ms. Renee Reedhardt.

=== History ===
==== Selected former principals ====
Previous assignment and reason for departure denoted within parentheses

- K. Gary Bartoo;1978-1998 (Teacher, retired)
- Charles Funke–1991-2000 (Assistant Principal/Athletics Director - Iroquois Senior High School, retired)
- Anne Marotta–2000-2003 (Principal - Letchworth Middle School, named Assistant Superintendent for Curriculum & Instruction at Kenmore-Town of Tonawanda School District)
- Brian M. Wiesinger–2003-2007 (Assistant Principal - Iroquois Senior High School, named Assistant Superintendent of Curriculum at Iroquois Central School District)
- Ann Marie Spitzer–2007-2010 (Assistant Principal - West Seneca East Middle School, resigned)

== Elma Primary School ==
Elma Primary School

Location
- 711 Rice Road; Elma, Iroquois, New York 14059

Information
- Principal: Kathryn Goldman
- Grades: K-3
- Website: Elma Primary School

Elma Primary School is located at 711 Rice Road and serves grades K through 3. The current principal is Ms. Kathryn Goldman.

=== History ===
==== Selected former principals ====
Previous assignment and reason for departure denoted within parentheses

- Rebecca Todd–?-1997
- Renee Lorenz–1997-2006 (Principal - Akron Elementary, retired)
- Martin D. Cox–2006-2007 (Principal - A.J. Clark Elementary School, named Principal of DeSales High School)
- Julie Schwab–2007-2008 (Principal - Marilla Primary, named Director of Curriculum, Instruction, and Technology for Silver Creek Central School District)
- Darcy Walker-2008-2022 (Director of Special Education, Hamburg Central School District, retired)
- Peter Dobmeier-2022-2026 (Principal - Casey Middle School, named Assistant Superintendent for Curriculum at Iroquois Central School District)

== Marilla Primary School ==
Marilla Primary School

Location
- 11683 Bullis Road; Marilla, Erie, New York 14102; United States

Information
- Principal: Andrea Rozansky
- Grades: K-3
- Website: Marilla Primary

Iroquois Primary School is located at 11683 Bullis Road in Marilla and serves grades K through 3. The current principal is Ms. Andrea Rozansky.

=== Selected former principals ===
Previous assignment and reason for departure denoted in parentheses

- Judith Craig–1991-1998 (unknown, retired)
- Gloria Zimmerman–1998-2004 (Director of Special Education - North Tonawanda City School District, retired)
- Julie Schwab–2004-2007 (Assistant Principal - Errick Road Elementary, named Principal of Elma Primary)
- Regina Becker-?-2016
- Amy Stanfield- 2017-2026 (retired)

== Wales Primary ==
Wales Primary

Location
- 4650 Woodchuck Road; East Aurora, Erie, New York 14052; United States

Information
- Principal: Kimberly Morrison
- Grades: K-3
- Website: Wales Primary

Wales Primary School is located at 4650 Woodchuck Road in the town of Wales, New York and serves grades K through 3. The current principal is Mrs. Kimberly Morrison.

=== Former principals ===
Previous assignment and reason for departure denoted within parentheses

- Sarah Chambers–?-2001
- Kevin McGowan–2001-2006 (Assistant Principal - Iroquois Senior High School, named Superintendent of Warsaw Central School District)

=== Business First ranking ===
In recent years, the district has been on the honor roll of Buffalo Business First WNY Schools Ratings which are based on test scores. In 2008 it was ranked ninth. The high school was ranked eighth among public high schools, and the middle school was ranked tenth among public middle schools.
