= East Aurora Union Free School District =

School district in the U.S. state of New York

Location
- East Aurora, New York United States

District information
- Motto: Exploration, Innovation, Growth, Opportunity
- Grades: K-12
- Superintendent: Brian Russ
- Schools: 3

Students and staff
- Athletic conference: Section VI
- District mascot: Blue Devils
- Colors: Blue and White

Other information
- Website: East Aurora Free School District

East Aurora Union Free School District is a school district in East Aurora, New York, United States. The superintendent is Brian Russ. The district operates three schools: East Aurora High School, East Aurora Middle School, and Parkdale Elementary School.

East Aurora Schools have been recognized by the National Blue Ribbon Schools Program. The Middle School in 2012 and the High School in 2017.

== Administration ==
The district offices are located at 430 Main Street. The current superintendent is Brian Russ.

=== Selected former superintendents ===
Previous assignment and previous assignment denoted in parentheses

- Walter L. Bumgardner–?-1961 (Principal - East Aurora High School, retired)
- Clarence M. Green–1961-1965
- William T. Crocoli–1965-?
- Philip M. Martin
- Thomas Fower-Finn
- Merton L. Haynes [interim]–1992-1993 (Interim Superintendent - Grand Island Central School District, named Interim Superintendent of West Seneca Central School District)
- Robert B. Fort–1989-1997 (unknown, retired)
- Howard S. Smith–1997-2004 (unknown, named Superintendent of Williamsville Central School District)
- James C. Bodziak–2004-2011 (Assistant Superintendent of Curriculum and Instruction - Orchard Park Central School District, named Superintendent of Frontier Central School District)

== East Aurora High School ==
East Aurora High School

Location
- 1003 Center Road

Information
- Principal: William D. Roberts
- Grades: 9-12
- Rival: Iroquois High School
- Yearbook: Auroran
- Website: East Aurora High School

East Aurora High School is located at 1003 Center Street and serves grades 9 through 12. The current principal is William Roberts. The U.S. News & World Report ranked the High School #2 in Buffalo, NY Metro Area High Schools.

=== History ===
East Aurora High School opened in March 1971 and was dedicated on April 25, 1971.

==== Former principals ====
Previous assignment and previous assignment denoted in parentheses

- Harold W. Mead–1927-1933 (Teacher - East Aurora Union Free School, named Superintendent of East Aurora Union Free School District)
- Walter L. Bumgardner–1927-1933 (unknown, named Superintendent of East Aurora Union Free School District)
- Joseph E. Barber
- Thomas C. Moore–1946-1961 (Principal - Salamanca High School, retired)
- H. Lewis McNeil–1961-1962
- R. Bruce MacPherson–1962-1964 (Administrative Assistant - East Aurora Junior-Senior High School, resigned)
- Donald J. Lawson–1964-1984 (Principal - East Aurora Junior High School, retired)
- James L. Hoagland–1984-2017 (Assistant Principal - Woodstock High School, retired)

== East Aurora Middle School ==
East Aurora Middle School

Location
- 430 Main Street

Information
- Principal: Matthew J. Brown
- Grades: 5-8
- Website: East Aurora Middle School

East Aurora Middle School is located at 430 Main Street and serves grades 5 through 8. The current principal is Matthew Brown.

=== History ===
East Aurora Middle School opened on September 5, 1916 (kindergarten department opened on September 4, 1917) as the original East Aurora High school until March 1971 when the current high school opened. The building was dedicated on November 27, 1917.

== Parkdale Elementary School ==
Parkdale Elementary

Location
- 141 Girard Avenue

Information
- Principal: T'Hani Pantoja
- Grades: K-4
- Website: Parkdale ELementary

Parkdale Elementary is located at 141 Girard Avenue and serves grades K through 4. The current principal is T'Hani Pantoja.

=== History ===
Parkdale Elementary School was built and opened on September 8, 1954 then closed until October 7, 1954 as the interior work was not completed until then.
