= Cazenovia Creek =

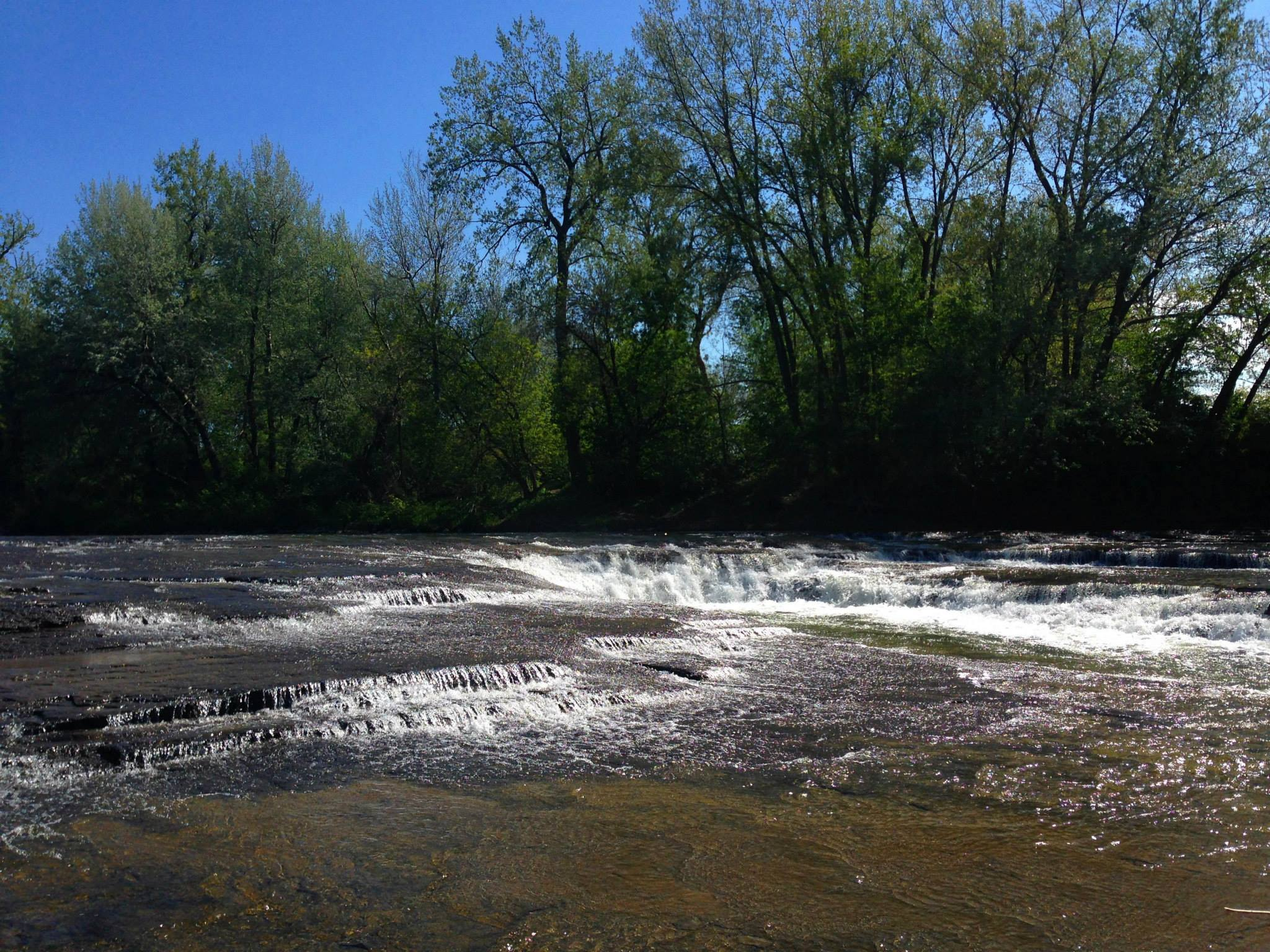
- Cazenovia Creek flowing through Cazenovia Park in South Buffalo

- Location of the mouth of Cazenovia Creek in New York State Cazenovia Creek (the United States)

Location
- Country: United States
- State: New York
- County: Erie

Physical characteristics
- Source
  - location: Aurora
  - coordinates: 42°45′38″N 78°38′42″W
- Mouth: Buffalo River
  - location: South Buffalo
  - coordinates: 42°51′40″N 78°49′36″W

Basin features
- Tributaries
  - left: West Branch Cazenovia Creek
  - right: East Branch Cazenovia Creek

Cazenovia Creek is a creek in Western New York, United States. It is a tributary of the Buffalo River, which empties into Lake Erie. Cazenovia Creek and its watershed are entirely within Erie County.

== Course ==
Cazenovia Creek is formed from its two branches west of the Village of East Aurora and flows through the Towns of Aurora, Elma, West Seneca, and the City of Buffalo. It joins the Buffalo River in the South Buffalo neighborhood.

The East Branch of Cazenovia Creek flows through the Village of East Aurora and has its sources in the Southtowns of Erie County, primarily in the towns of Aurora, Wales, Holland, and Sardinia. The West Branch of Cazenovia Creek rises from sources in the towns of Colden, Concord, and Sardinia.

== History ==
Cazenovia Creek is named after Theophilus Cazenove, an agent of the Holland Land Company.

In 1897, landscape architect Frederick Law Olmsted drew up plans for a park near the south city line of Buffalo. A farm at that location was purchased in 1890, and Cazenovia Park, straddling Cazenovia River, was built at that location. The park is in the South Buffalo section of the city.

Cazenovia Creek is known for its annual ice jams in the early spring when temperatures rise.

== Fishing ==
Cazenovia Creek also has a wide variety of fish that run through its waters. Species include catfish, large and small mouth bass, and rainbow and brown trout. Water levels can rise and fall very quickly and the current can be very strong at times.

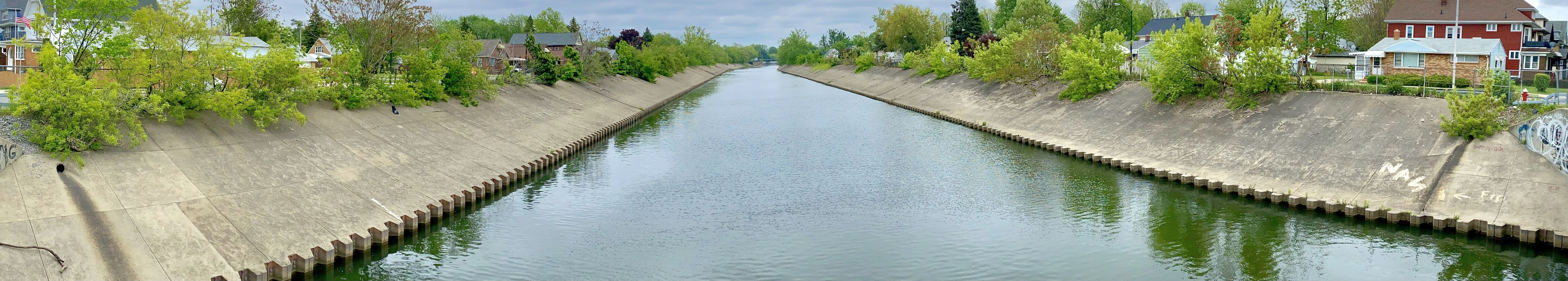
Cazenovia Creek from Stevenson Street Bridge

== See also ==
- List of rivers of New York
