= Gow School =

Special school in South Wales, New York, United States

The Gow School
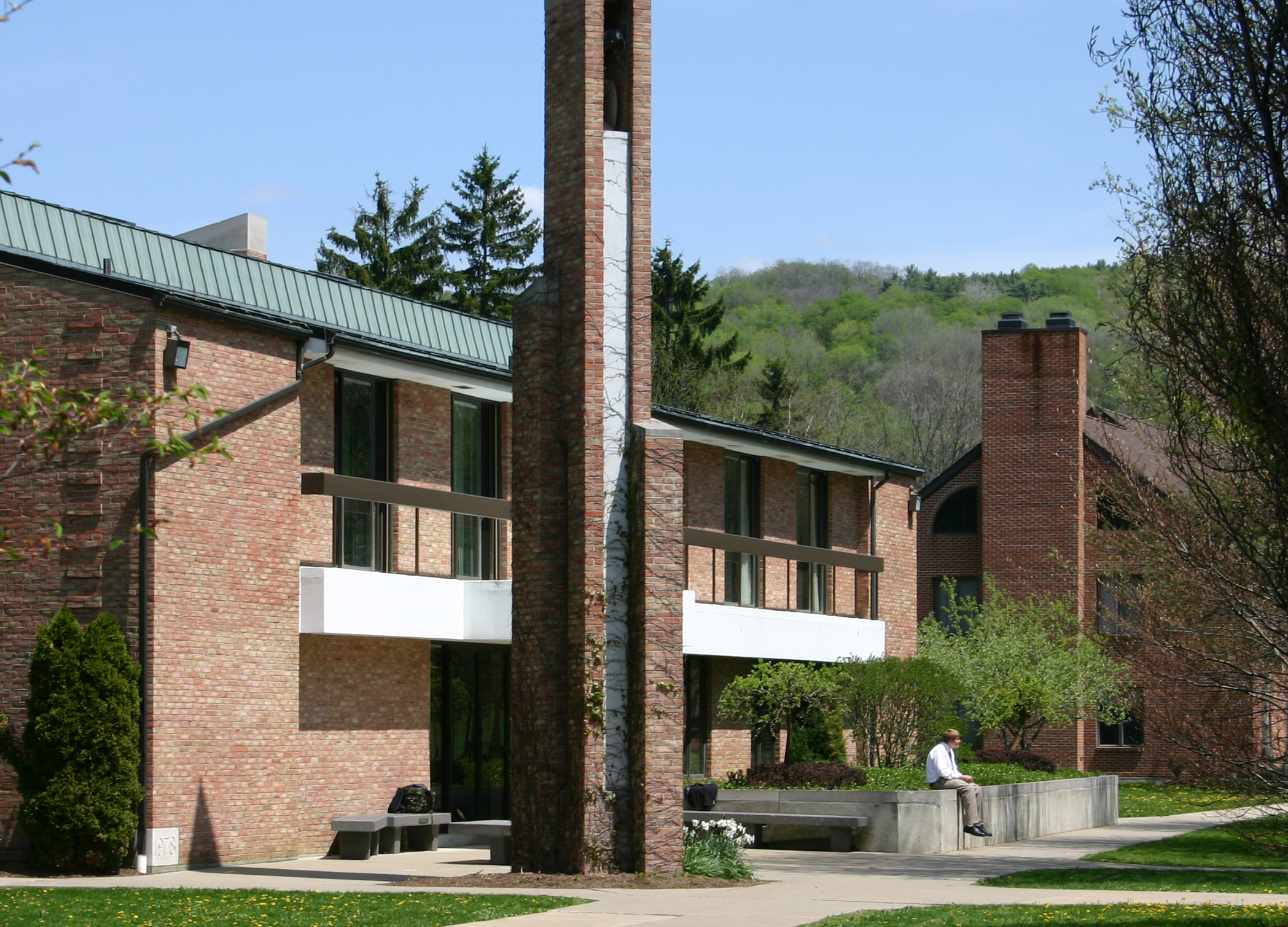

Location
- 2491 Emery Road; South Wales, New York 14139; United States; 42.708809°N 78.582627°W

Information
- Type: Independent
- Established: 1926
- Founder: Peter Gow, Jr.
- CEEB code: 335290
- NCES School ID: 00941795
- Head of School: John Munro
- Faculty: 32.3 (on an FTE basis)
- Grades: 5–PG
- Enrollment: 130 (2022–23)
- Student to teacher ratio: 4:1
- Campus: Rural, 100-acre (0.4 km^{2})
- Colors: Crimson and navy blue
- Mascot: Raven
- Accreditation: New York State Association of Independent Schools
- School fees: $2,500 (bookstore deposit)
- Tuition: $77,500 (boarding), $57,500 (day)
- Revenue: $12,450,580
- Website: www.gow.org

The Gow School is a college-prep boarding and day school located in South Wales, New York, United States, a hamlet close to Buffalo. It is for students, grades 6–12, with dyslexia and similar language-based learning disabilities, such as include developmental coordination disorder, auditory processing disorder, dyscalculia, dysgraphia, and disorder of written expression. Students may also have attention (ADD or ADHD) or executive function difficulties. The school was founded in 1926 by educator Peter Gow, along with insight from his colleague, neurologist Dr. Samuel T. Orton.

== History ==
The Gow School has its roots in the early teaching experience of founder Peter Gow Jr., who as an instructor at Choate Rosemary Hall, Nichols School, and The Park School of Buffalo had become interested in the plight of students who, though clearly intellectually able, struggled with certain aspects of learning in the language domain, especially spelling and reading. After contacting Dr. Samuel T. Orton, a noted New York physician who had done pioneering work in the area of dyslexia, Gow began development of the Reconstructive Language methodology that has been the backbone of the Gow School program since its founding.

Gow’s college preparatory curriculum is presented using a multi-sensory format integrated with educational technology. The school maintains a 4:1 student-to-faculty ratio, focusing on the remediation of language based learning differences (reading, written expression, spelling, dysgraphia, auditory processing disorder and dyscalculia) through a phonics based program known as Reconstructive Language, based on Orton-Gillingham principles. In addition to academics, Gow provides athletic programs, fine arts courses, and a and is situated on a 125-acre campus(0.4 km2) campus.

In 2020, former students came forward with credible allegations of sexual misconduct in the late 80's and early 90's. In March 2025, former Gow School administrator Matthew Fisher pled guilty to charges of possessing and producing child pornography on the Gow School campus in Gow dormitories Matthew Fisher was sentenced to 26 years imprisonment.

== Campus ==
Orton Hall, built in 1987, houses the student study and the Constantine Computer Center.

Issac Arnold Library was built in 1978 and contains the school library and a number of administrative offices.

== Notable alumni ==
- Brooks McCabe 1966, Democratic West Virginia State Senator
- Quinn Bradlee 2002, learning disabilities advocate
- Brian Talma ’84, Olympic windsurfer, member of Professional Windsurfing Association (PWA) World Tour, Barbados Service Star recipient
- Daniel B. Wesson II '35, American inventor and firearms maker, who in 1968 founded the company now known as Dan Wesson Firearms.
