= Alice Moore Hubbard =

American activist (1861–1915)

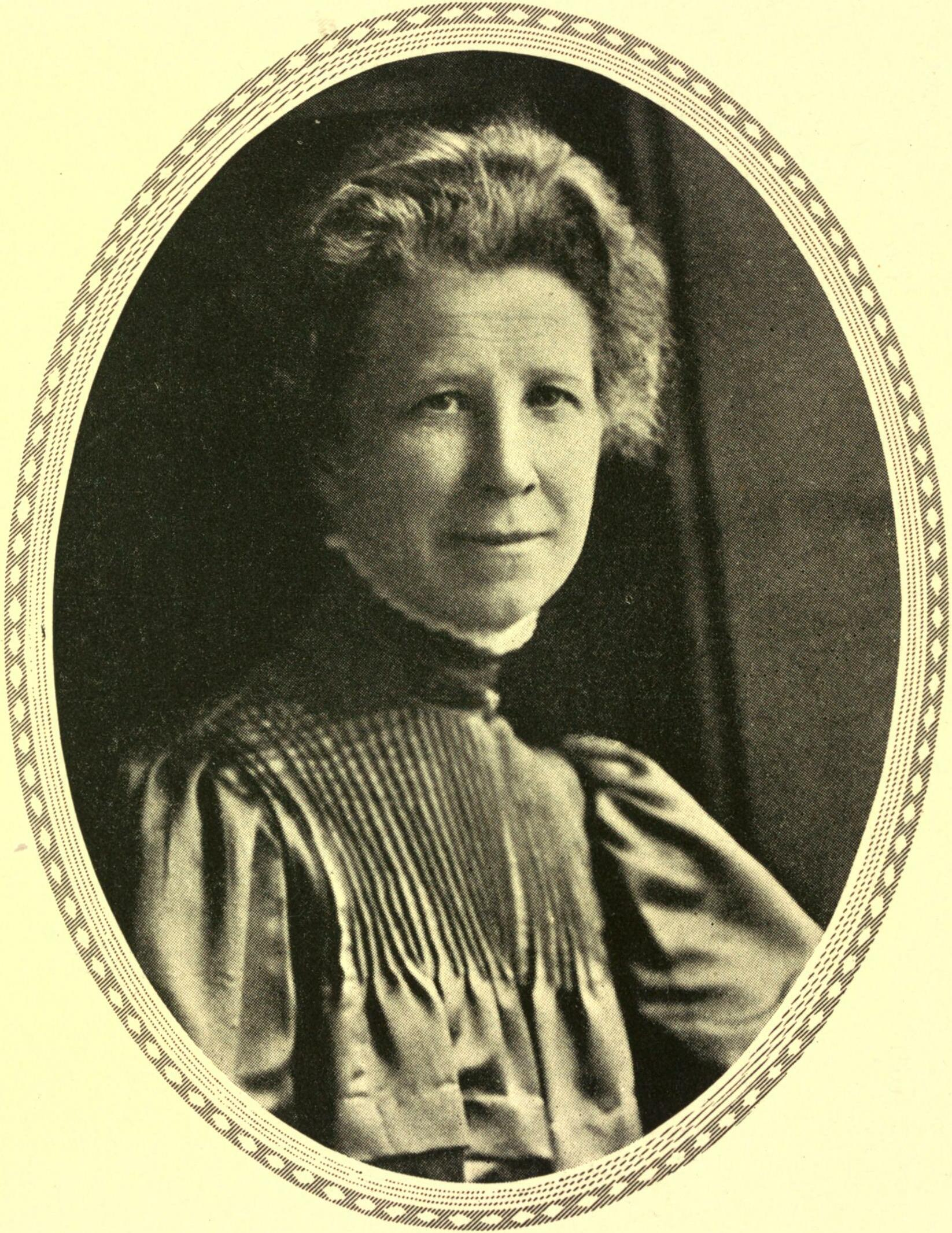
- Born: Alice Luann Moore; June 7, 1861; Wales, New York, U.S.
- Died: May 7, 1915 (aged 53); RMS Lusitania, Atlantic Ocean
- Spouse: Elbert Hubbard (m. 1904)
- Children: Miriam Elberta Hubbard

Signature
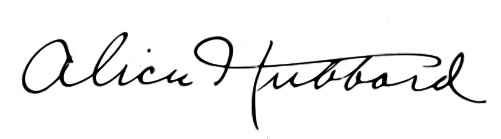

Alice Moore Hubbard (June 7, 1861 – May 7, 1915) was a noted American feminist and writer. She and her husband, Elbert Hubbard, were leading figures in the Roycroft movement, a branch of the Arts and Crafts Movement in England with which it was contemporary. Moore Hubbard served as the general manager for the collective, along with managing the Roycraft Inn. She was also the principal of Roycroft School for Boys.

Born Alice Luann Moore in Wales, New York to Welcome Moore and Melinda Bush, she was a schoolteacher before meeting her future husband, the married soap salesman and philosopher Elbert Hubbard whom she married in 1904 after a controversial affair in which she bore an illegitimate child, Miriam Elberta Hubbard (1894–1985).

On March 3, 1913, Hubbard marched in the first Washington, D.C. suffragist parade.

The couple died in the sinking of the RMS Lusitania during the First World War while on a voyage to Europe to cover the war and ultimately interview Kaiser Wilhelm II of Germany.

== Selected works ==
- Justinian and Theodora, 1906; with Elbert Hubbard
- Woman's Work, 1908
- Life Lessons, 1909
- The Basis of Marriage, 1910, includes an interview with Hubbard by Sophie Irene Loeb
- The Myth in Marriage, 1912

== See also ==
- Bertha Crawford Hubbard
- East Aurora, New York
