= Bertha Crawford Hubbard =

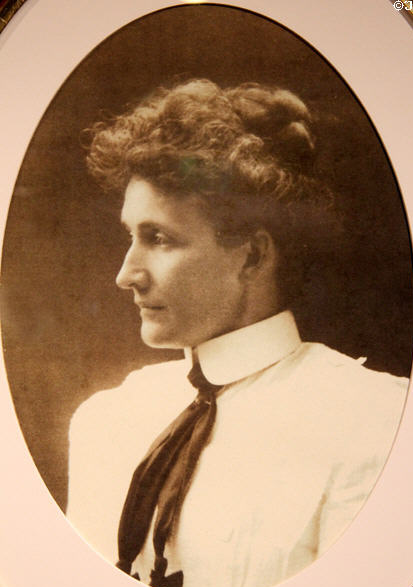
- Born: Bertha Crawford
- Occupations: Writer, publisher, artist, philosopher, mother
- Spouse: Elbert Hubbard (divorced)
- Children: 4

Bertha C. Crawford Hubbard (1859–1935) was one of the founders of the Roycroft movement, an American branch of the Arts and Crafts movement of the late 19th and early 20th centuries.

Bertha Crawford was born November 21, 1859 in Allegany County, Maryland to James C. Crawford and Elizabeth Hinkle. She married Elbert Hubbard, the charismatic leader of the Roycrofters on June 30, 1881, in Bloomington, Illinois – when he was a soap salesman for the Larkin Soap Company. Their marriage produced four children, but ended in divorce because of her husband's infidelity with Alice Moore, a local school-teacher. Elbert and Moore would eventually marry. After the Hubbards' divorce, Bertha was pushed out of the Roycroft business and supplanted by Alice Moore, despite Bertha's considerable influence in Roycroft's development. Her children went on to lead Roycrofters in the years after the death of their father and Alice Moore in the sinking of the RMS Lusitania.

Bertha died on May 12, 1935 at her home in Huntington, Suffolk County, Long Island, NY.
