= Randall James Bayer =

American botanist

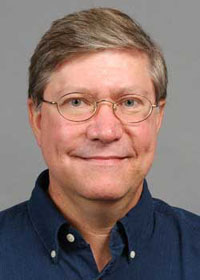
- Born: July 13, 1955 (age 70); Buffalo, New York
- Scientific career
- Fields: Systematic botany

Randall James Bayer (born 13 July 1955) is an American systematic botanist born in Buffalo, New York, who spent his childhood in East Aurora. He earned a B.Sc. with major in plant breeding and minor in horticulture in 1978 from Cornell University; an M.Sc. in systematic botany in 1980 from the Ohio State University; and a Ph.D. in 1984 from the Ohio State University with the dissertation Evolutionary Investigations in Antennaria. His interest in the genus Antennaria was inspired by noted evolutionary botanist George Ledyard Stebbins (1906–2000) who was a visiting professor at the Ohio State University in 1978–1979.

His early academic career was as an assistant professor of Biology and Curator of the Benedict Herbarium (WOCB) at University of Windsor, Ontario (1984–1987). In 1987 he moved to Edmonton, Alberta, to take up the post of assistant professor of Botany and Curator of the Vascular Plant Herbarium (ALTA) at the University of Alberta (1987–1990). He was promoted to associate professor of botany in 1990 and Professor of Botany in 1995. During his sabbatical year in 1994, he was Visiting Adjunct Scientist at Washington State University, Department of Botany. While at the University of Alberta he developed his research program on evolutionary studies in Antennaria (Asteraceae). He has become a well-known authority on the genus and its associated polyploidy and apomixis. He has contributed taxonomic revisions of this genus to a number of North American floras.

In 1997, he emigrated to Canberra, Australia, where he became a senior principal research scientist with the CSIRO, Division of Plant Industry working at the Australian National Herbarium (CANB). He also became an Adjunct Reader in Botany at the Australian National University, Division of Botany and Zoology. He specializes in systematics and evolution of the Asteraceae (Gnaphalieae) of Australia and the world. Bayer also has expertise in taxonomy and molecular phylogeny of Citrus (Rutaceae) and its close relatives, which have great diversity in southeast Asia. Bayer has published about 100 papers and book chapters in internationally recognized publications.

He has collected plants around the world, including Australia, New Zealand, New Caledonia, United States, Canada, South America, southern Africa, Madagascar and western Europe. His collections are primarily deposited in ALTA and CANB, with duplicates of many collections in herbaria worldwide.

== Publications ==
The standard author abbreviation R.J.Bayer is used to indicate this person as the author when citing a botanical name.

=== Book chapters ===
- Bayer, R.J. In press. Antennaria. In: Flora of North America North of Mexico. Edited by the Flora North America Editorial Committee. New York: Oxford University Press.
- Bayer, R. J., I. Breitwieser, J. Ward, and C. F. Puttock. In press. Gnaphalieae. In: The Families and Genera of Vascular Plants. Editor, K. Kubitzki. New York : Springer-Verlag.
- Funk, V. A., R. J. Bayer, S. Keeley, R. Chan, L. Watson, B. Gemeinholzer, E. Schilling, J. L. Panero, B. G. Baldwin, N. Garcia-Jacas, A. Susanna and R. K. Jansen. 2005. Everywhere, but Antarctica: Using a supertree to understand the diversity and distribution of the Compositae. In: Friis, I. & Balslev, H. (eds.) Proceedings of a Symposium on Plant Diversity and Complexity Patterns – Local, Regional and Global Dimensions. The Royal Danish Academy of Sciences and Letters, Copenhagen. Biol. Skr. 55: 343–374. ISBN 87-7304-304-4.
- Ainouche, A-K, R. J. Bayer, P. Cubas, and M. T. Misset. 2003. Phylogenetic relationships within tribe Genisteae (Papilionaceae) with special reference to the genus Ulex. In B. Klitgaard and A. Bruneau (eds.), Advances in Legume Systematics. Part 10, Higher Level Systematics. pp. 239–252. Royal Botanic Gardens, Kew.
- Miller, J. M. and R.J. Bayer. 2001. Molecular phylogenetics of Acacia (Fabaceae: Mimosoideae) based on the chloroplast trnK/matK and nuclear Histone H3-D DNA sequences. In Herendeen PS, Bruneau A, eds. Advances in legume systematics: part 9. Kew: Royal Botanic Gardens, Kew, 2000, publ. 2001, pp. 181–200.
- Mant, J. G., R.J. Bayer, J. W. H. Trueman, and M. D. Crisp. 2000. A phylogeny of Triodieae (Poaceae: Chloridoideae) based on the ITS region of nrDNA: testing conflict between anatomical and inflorescence characters. In Jacobs S. W. L., Everett J. eds Grasses: Systematics and Evolution. Collingwood, Vic.: CSIRO, pp. 213–217.
- Bayer, R.J. 1999. New perspectives into the evolution of polyploid complexes. In: Plant evolution in man-made habitats. Proceedings of the VIIth international symposium of the international organization of plant biosystematists (L.W.D. van Raamsdonk and J. C. M. den Nijs, eds.). Hugo de Vries Laboratory, Amsterdam, the Netherlands, pgs. 359–373.
- Stebbins, G.L. and R.J. Bayer. 1993. Antennaria. In: The Jepson Manual of Higher Plants of California, J. Hickman Ed., University of California Press, pgs. 196–198.
