= Alexis Jean Fournier =

American painter (1865–1948)

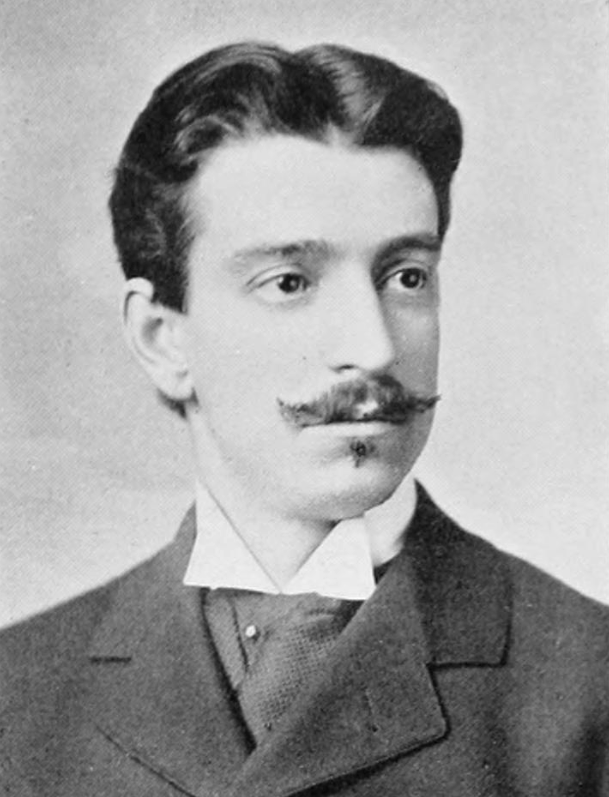
- Born: July 4, 1865; St. Paul, Minnesota
- Died: January 20, 1948 (aged 82); Lackawanna, New York
- Occupation: Artist

Alexis Jean Fournier (July 4, 1865 – January 20, 1948) was an American artist. He is well known in Minnesota for his naturalistic paintings of Minneapolis and St. Paul landmarks, such as Farnham's Mill, which was one of the earliest mills established in Minneapolis. Fournier is also renowned beyond Minnesota as an important figure in the Arts and Crafts movement.

== Early life ==
Born in St. Paul, Minnesota on July 4, 1865, Fournier was raised in Wisconsin by French Canadian parents. In 1879, at the age of fourteen, Fournier moved to Minneapolis. Aspiring to be an artist, Fournier found work painting signs and stage scenery. Creating stage scenery gave him more time for his own painting and gave him experience painting panoramas, a popular nineteenth century art form. He began to experience modest success as a landscape painter.

In 1886, Fournier attended a class at the newly established Minneapolis School of Art. The school was directed by Boston artist Douglas Volk, and Fournier soon took private lessons with him. Under Volk's instruction, Fournier developed a more subtle sense of color and a brushier style.

During the next three years, Fournier married his first wife Emma and had two children, Grace and Paul. He also began supporting his family as a full-time artist. He rented a studio above a tailor's shop at 412 Nicollet Avenue in Minneapolis.

== Painting career ==
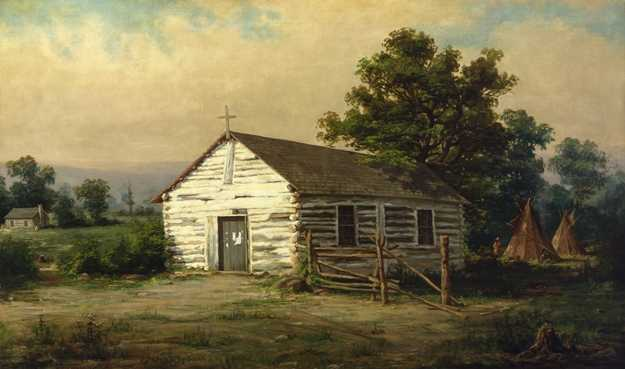
Chapel of St. Paul (1888)

Fournier was invited to travel around the American Southwest with patron H. Jay Smith in 1891. After the trip, Fournier painted an acclaimed 50x12 foot panoramic mural that depicted stone dwellings in cliffs in the Mesa Verde region of Colorado that had been constructed by Ancient Puebloans. The panoramic was displayed at the 1893 Columbian Exposition in Chicago, where thousands of people saw the mural and heard Fournier interpret it publicly.

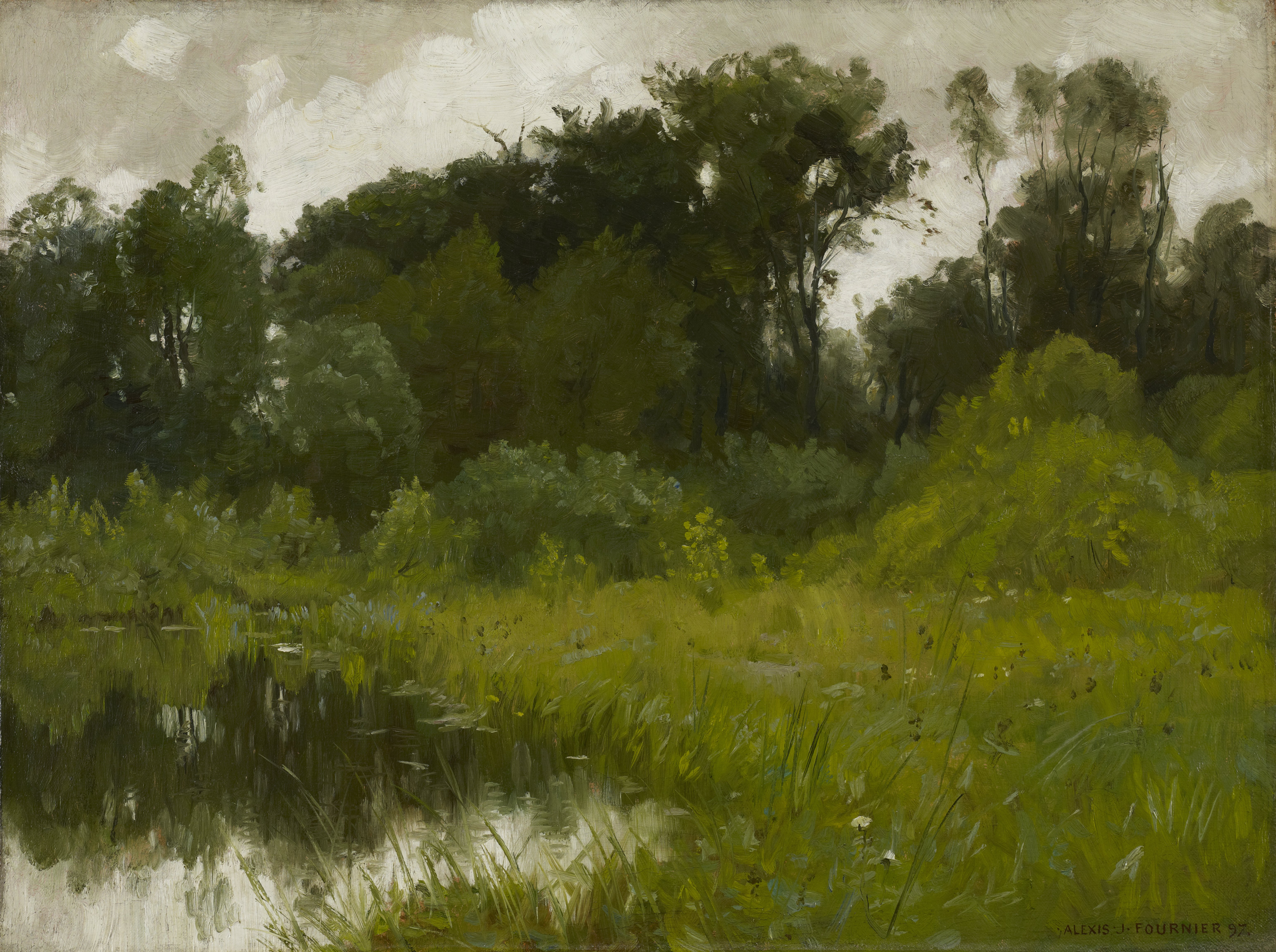
After Rain, on Minnehaha Creek (1897)

Continuing to grow as an artist, in 1893, Fournier traveled to Paris, France, where he studied at the Académie Julian. His trip was funded by several benefactors, including James J. Hill. In France, Fournier was strongly influenced by the Barbizon school, a group of nineteenth century French painters who were drawn to natural landscapes and romanticism.

Between 1895 and 1901, Fournier made several more trips to Paris. In between, he returned to Minneapolis and continued painting Twin Cities landmarks. He also became associated with the Arts and Crafts movement, an arts revival emphasizing handmade crafts. Arts and Craft movement leader John Scott Bradstreet invited Fournier to paint murals in Twin Cities dining rooms that he was commissioned to decorate.

Fournier's connection to the Arts and Crafts movement deepened in 1903 when he moved to East Aurora, New York, home of the Roycroft arts community. The community started as a printing shop but evolved to include book art, pottery, metalwork, jewelry, and furniture. The community's leader, Elbert G. Hubbard, had been friends with Fournier for several years. Fournier's move to East Aurora came after Hubbard invited him to be the Roycroft community's permanent art director.

Hubbard was a flamboyant man, and he traveled around the country giving lectures. Fournier, known for his charming personality and good humor, went with Hubbard on many of these trips. Fournier kept Hubbard company and exhibited his paintings at the lectures, bringing his work to a broader audience. Despite these travels and the many winters he spent in Minneapolis, Fournier was publicly identified with East Aurora and the Roycroft community.

The Roycroft community changed in 1915 when Hubbard and his wife died aboard the Lusitania, an ocean liner that was famously torpedoed by Germans during World War I. After his friend's passing, Fournier became close to a group of regional painters in Brown County, Indiana. He influenced their style, but they also influenced his. His paintings from Indiana were brighter and more impressionistic than his earlier work.

Fournier's first wife died and he sold his home in Minneapolis in 1921. He moved to Indiana the next year, when he remarried a widow whose husband had been linked to the Brown County artists. He continued to spend summers in East Aurora. After the death of his second wife in 1937, he moved to East Aurora permanently, and in 1941 he married a third time.

On January 16, 1948, at the age of eighty-two, Fournier slipped on an icy sidewalk near his home and sustained a fractured skull. Taken to Our Lady of Victory Hospital in Lackawanna, NY, he never regained consciousness and died four days later. Through his landscape paintings and his role in the Arts and Crafts movement, Fournier made a lasting influence on American art. His obituaries revered him as "the last of the Barbizon painters", since his style and admiration for the natural world brought the Barbizon tradition well into the twentieth century. His paintings were exhibited around the world during his lifetime and continue to be displayed and collected.
