= Roycroft =

Reformist community in New York, US

- Roycroft Campus
- U.S. National Register of Historic Places
- U.S. National Historic Landmark
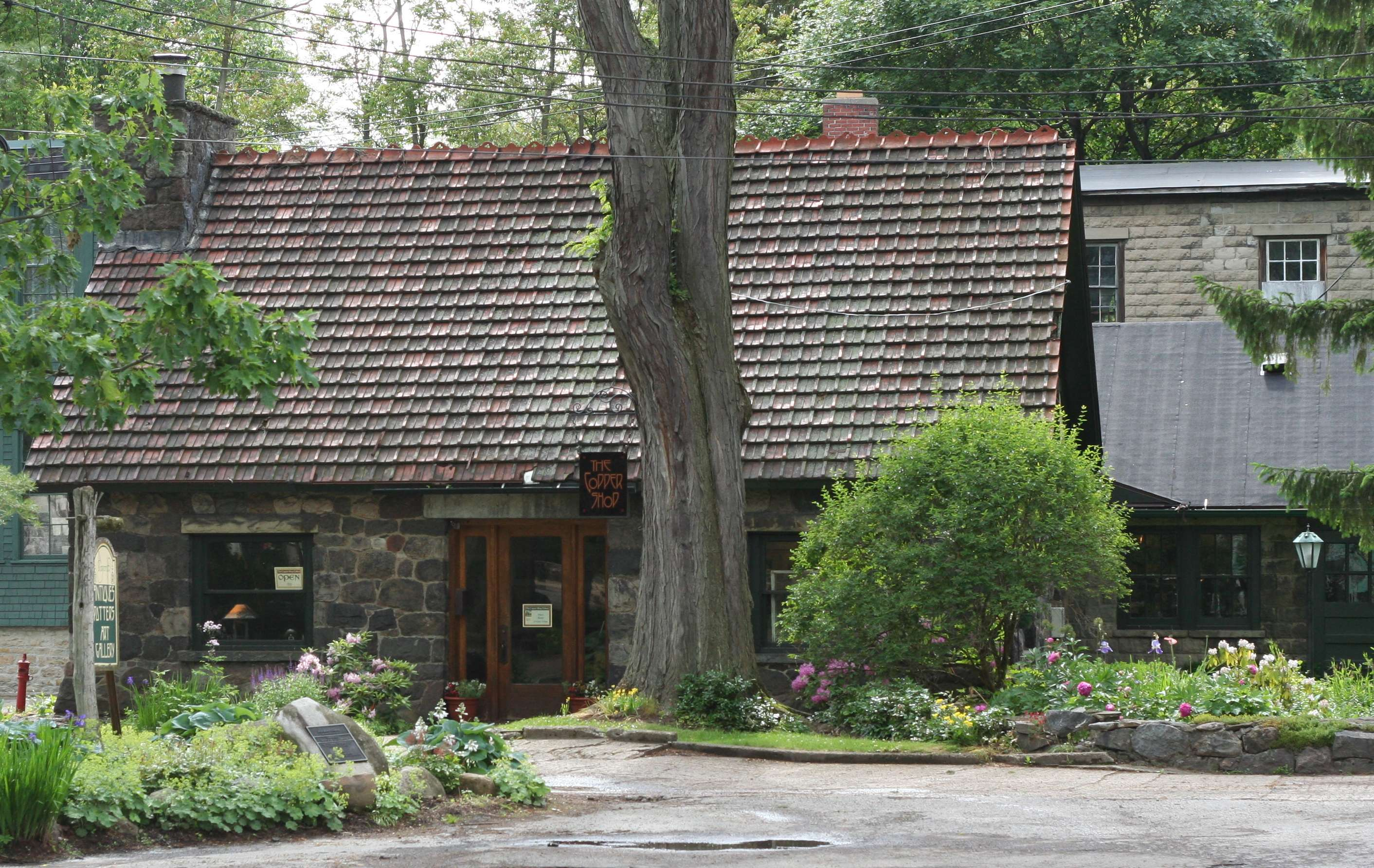
- The Copper Shop, first building of the Roycroft Campus to be restored
- Location: Main and South Grove St., East Aurora, New York
- Nearest city: Buffalo
- Coordinates: 42°46′04″N 78°37′04″W
- Built: 1895
- NRHP reference No.: 74001236

Significant dates
- Added to NRHP: November 8, 1974
- Designated NHL: February 26, 1986

Roycroft was a reformist community of craft workers and artists which formed part of the Arts and Crafts movement in the United States. Elbert Hubbard founded the community in 1895, in the village of East Aurora, New York, near Buffalo. Participants were known as Roycrofters. The work and philosophy of the group, often referred to as the Roycroft movement, had a strong influence on the development of American architecture and design in the early 20th century.

== History ==
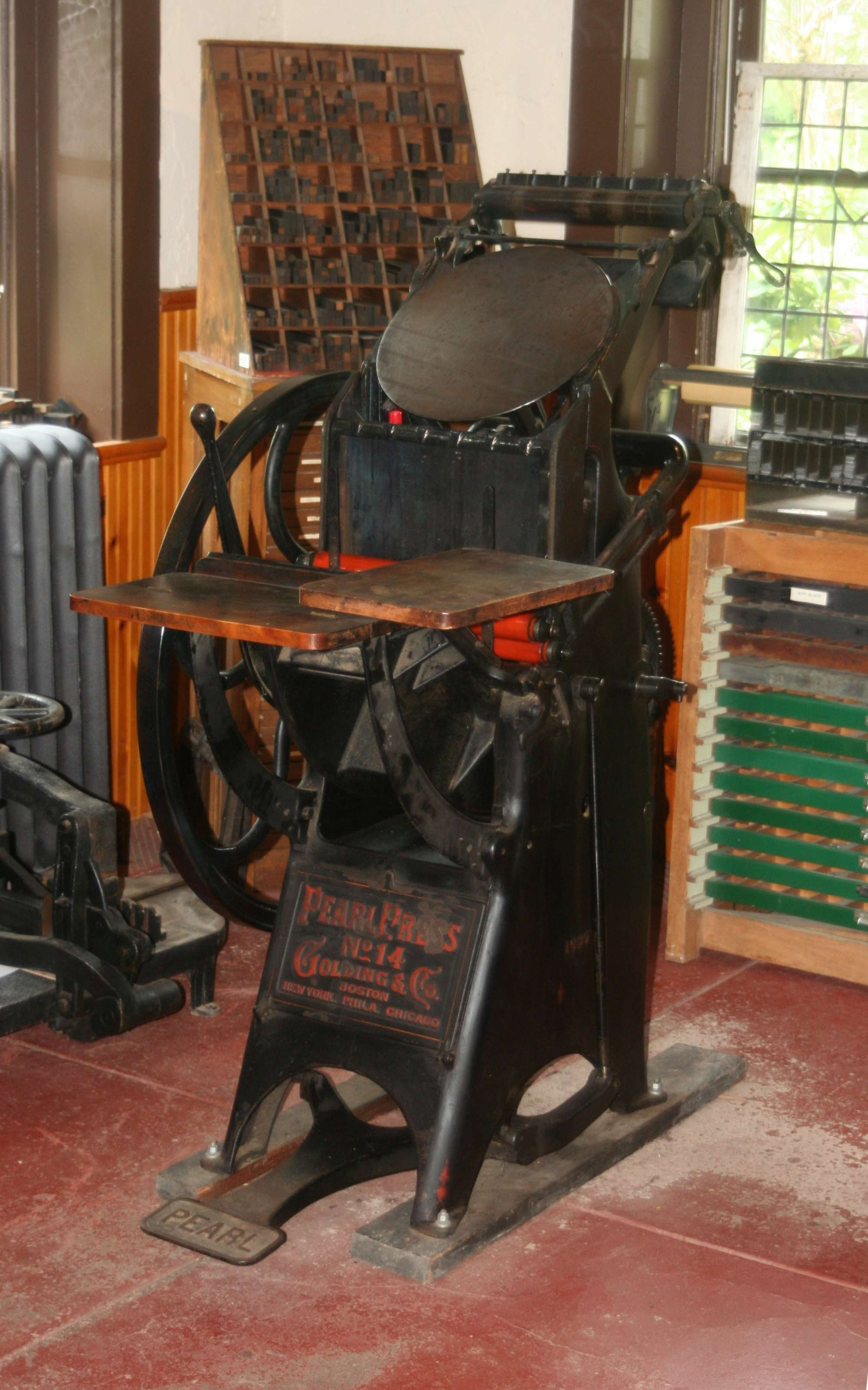
Golding Pearl letterpress used by the Roycrofters

The name "Roycroft" was chosen after the printers, Samuel and Thomas Roycroft, who made books in London from about 1650–1690. The word roycroft had a special significance to Elbert Hubbard. Hubbard believed "roycroft" meant "king's craft" in French. In guilds of early modern Europe, king's craftsmen were guild members who had achieved a high degree of skill and therefore made things for the King. The Roycroft insignia was borrowed from the monk Cassiodorus, a 13th-century bookbinder and illuminator.

Elbert Hubbard had been influenced by the ideas of William Morris on a visit to England. He was unable to find a publisher for his book Little Journeys so, inspired by Morris's Kelmscott Press, decided to set up his own private press to print the book himself, founding Roycroft Press.

His championing of the Arts and Crafts approach attracted a number of visiting craftspeople to East Aurora, and they formed a community of printers, furniture makers, metalsmiths, leathersmiths, and bookbinders. A quotation from John Ruskin formed the Roycroft "creed":

A belief in working with the head, hand and heart and mixing enough play with the work so that every task is pleasurable and makes for health and happiness.

The inspirational leadership of Hubbard attracted a group of almost 500 people by 1910, and millions more knew of him through his essay A Message to Garcia.

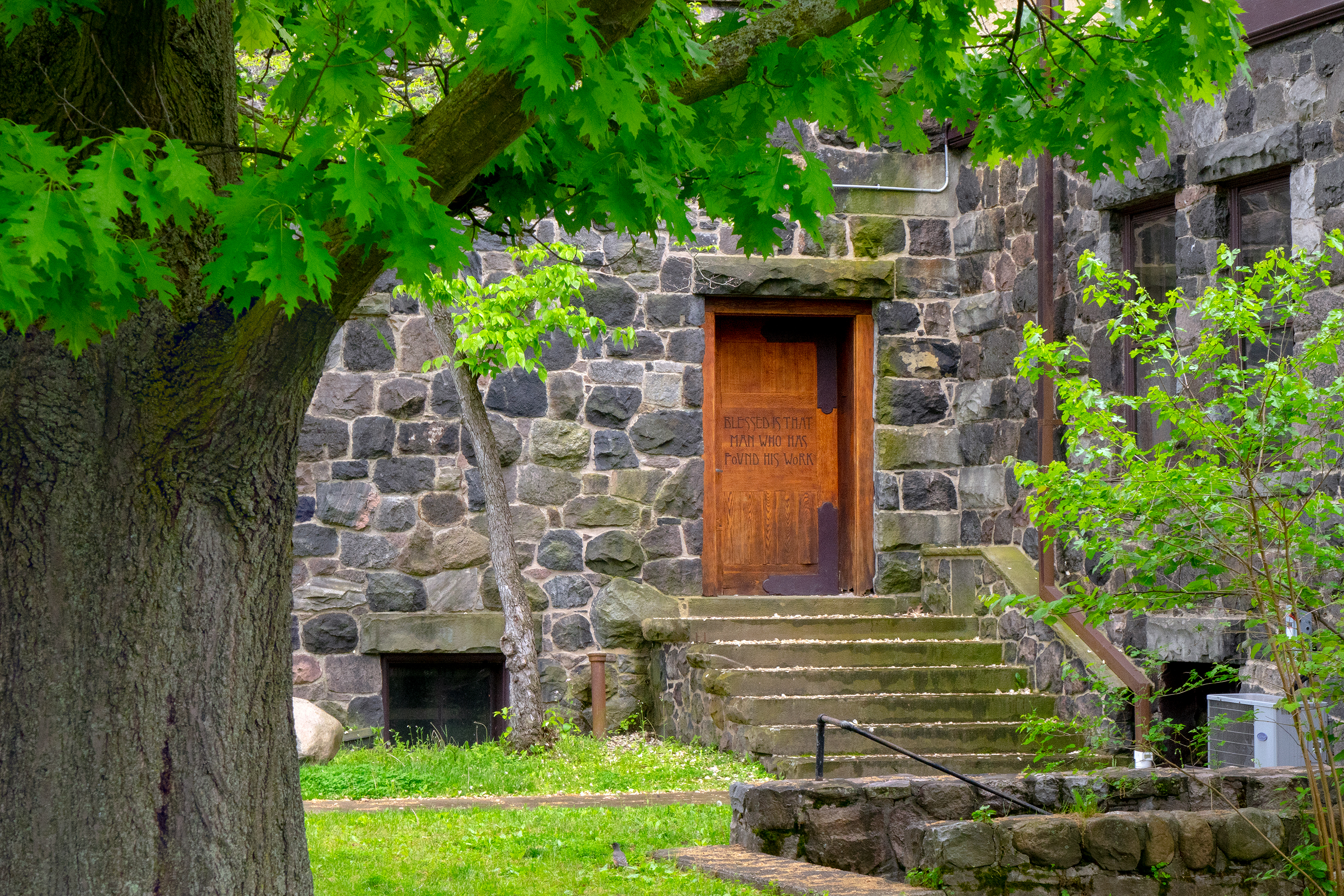
A door of the Chapel (not a religious building but a guild hall)

The Roycroft Press is also credited for publishing partner publications, such as Carl Lothar Bredemeier's The Buffalo Magazine for Arts in 1920.

In 1915 Hubbard and his wife, noted suffragist Alice Moore Hubbard, died in the sinking of RMS Lusitania, and the Roycroft community went into a gradual decline. Following Elbert's death, his son Bert took over the business. In attempts to keep his father's business afloat, Bert proposed selling Roycroft's furniture through major retailers. Sears & Roebuck eventually agreed to carry the furniture, but this was only a short-lived success.

Fourteen original Roycroft buildings are located in the area of South Grove and Main Street in East Aurora. Known as the "Roycroft Campus", this rare survival of an art colony was awarded National Historic Landmark status in 1986.

The Elbert Hubbard Roycroft Museum, housed in the George and Gladys Scheidemantel House in East Aurora is the main collection and research centre for the work of the Roycrofters.

=== Roycroft Inn ===
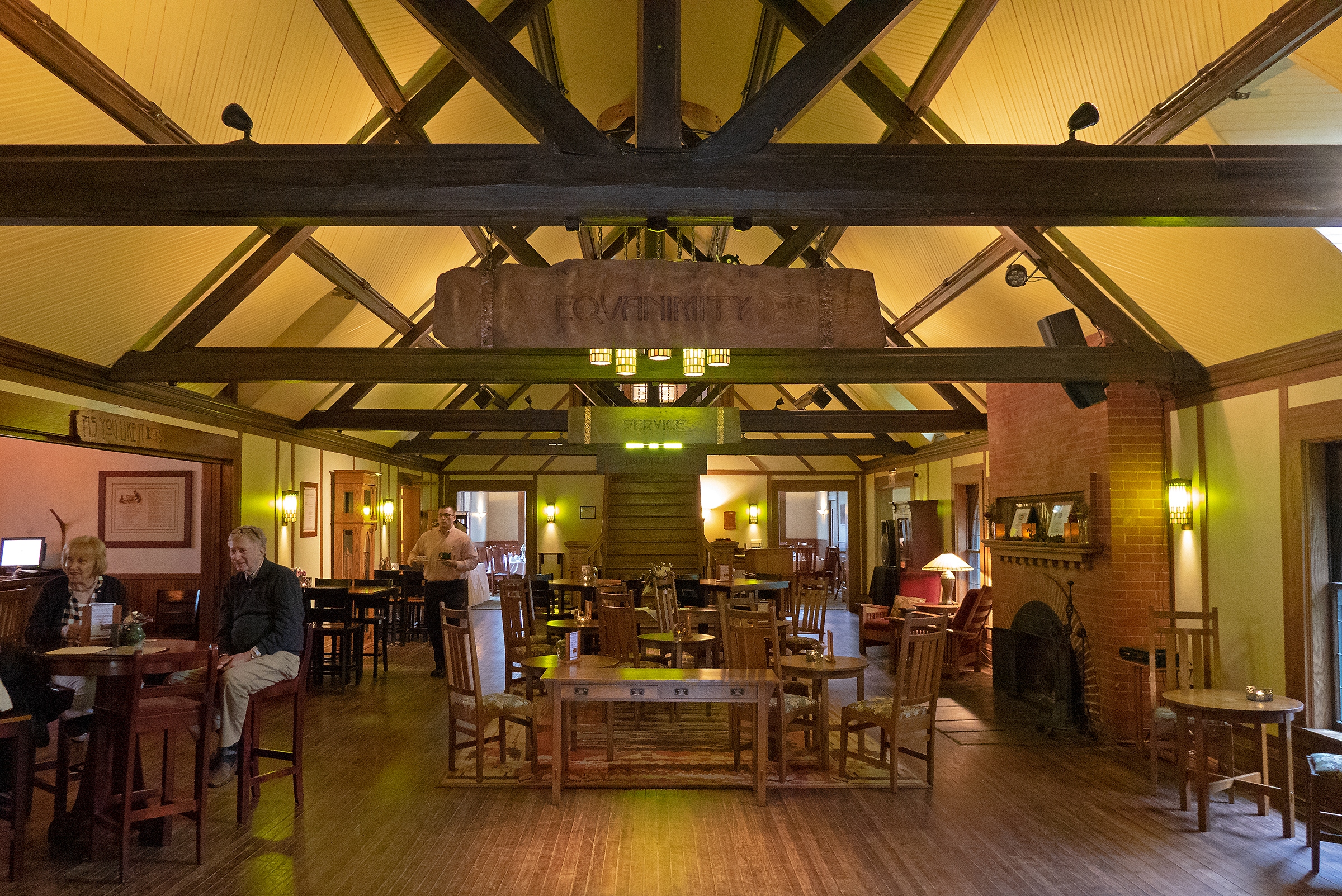
Roycroft Inn, Lobby bar, Roycroft Campus

Part of the Roycroft Campus, the Inn is a hotel with a restaurant and lobby bar across the street from the primary buildings. It first opened for visitors in 1905 and in 1986, as part of the Roycroft Campus, became a National Historic Landmark. A nine-year restoration was completed in 1995, with funding from the Margaret L. Wendt Foundation; the total cost was $8 million. At that time, the facility re-opened. The Salon area contains restored murals by Roycroft artist Alexis Jean Fournier.

The inn also hosted a training camp for the Buffalo Bills from 1960 until 1962.

== Gallery ==
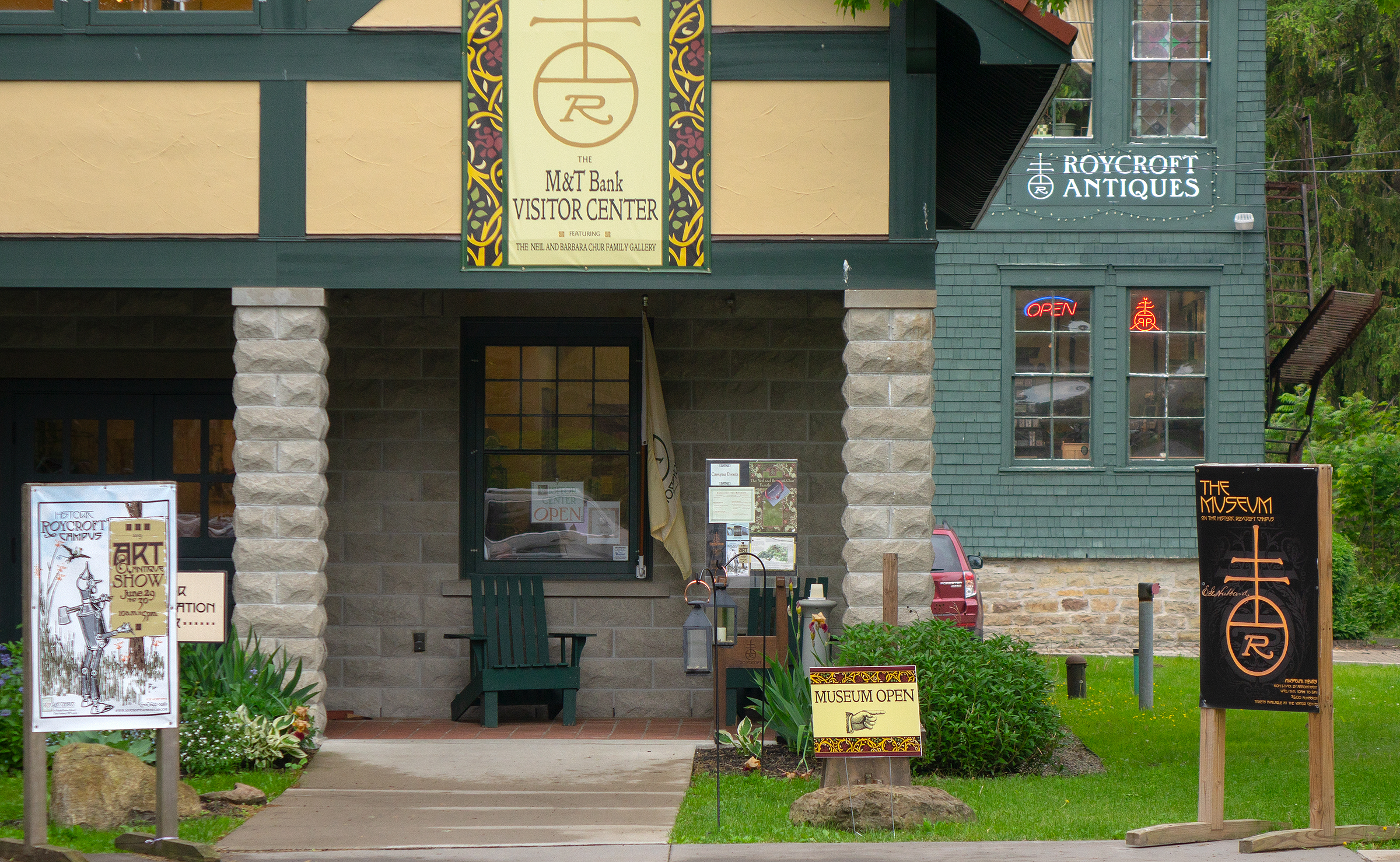
Visitor Center, June 2019

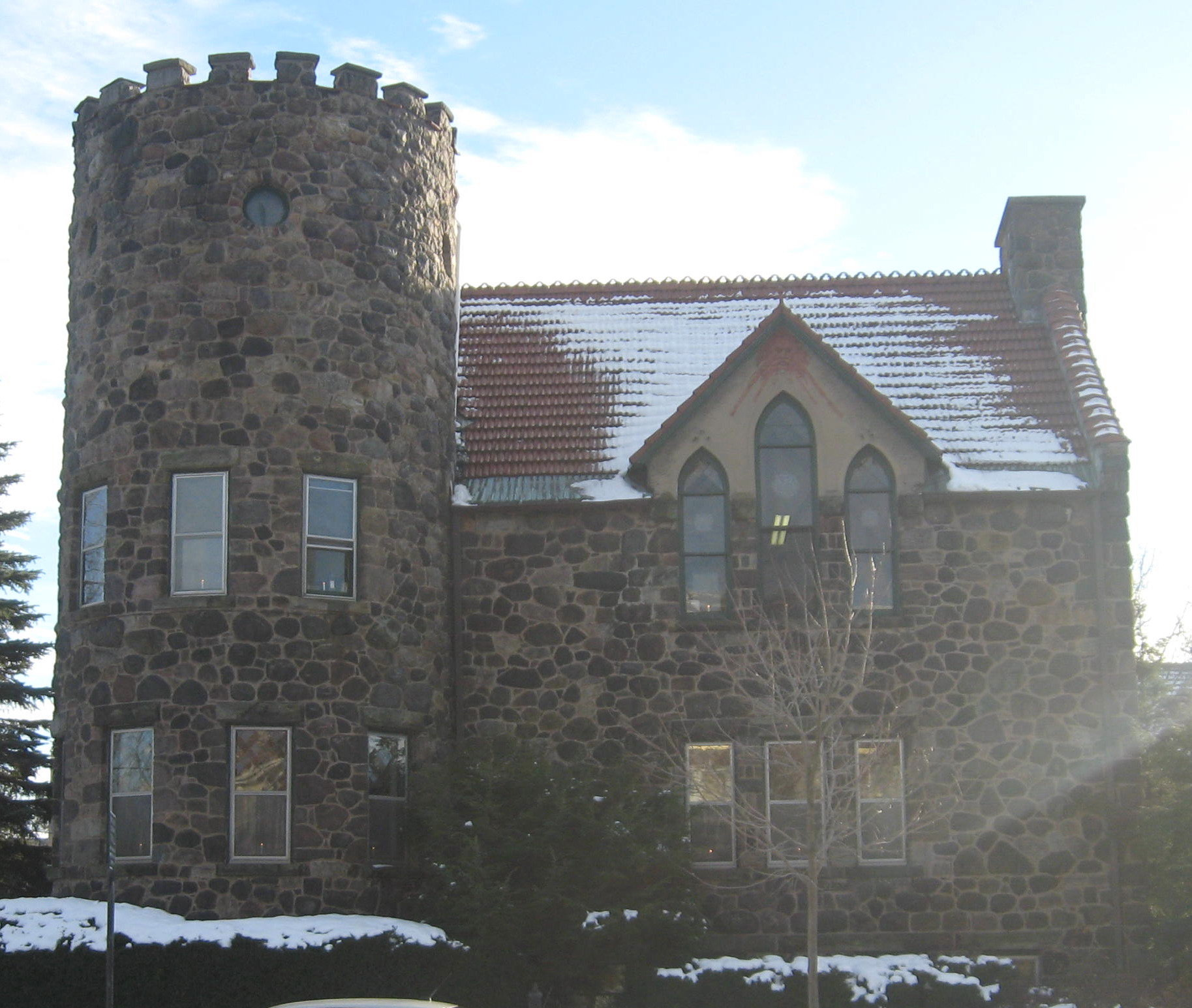
Front of the Chapel

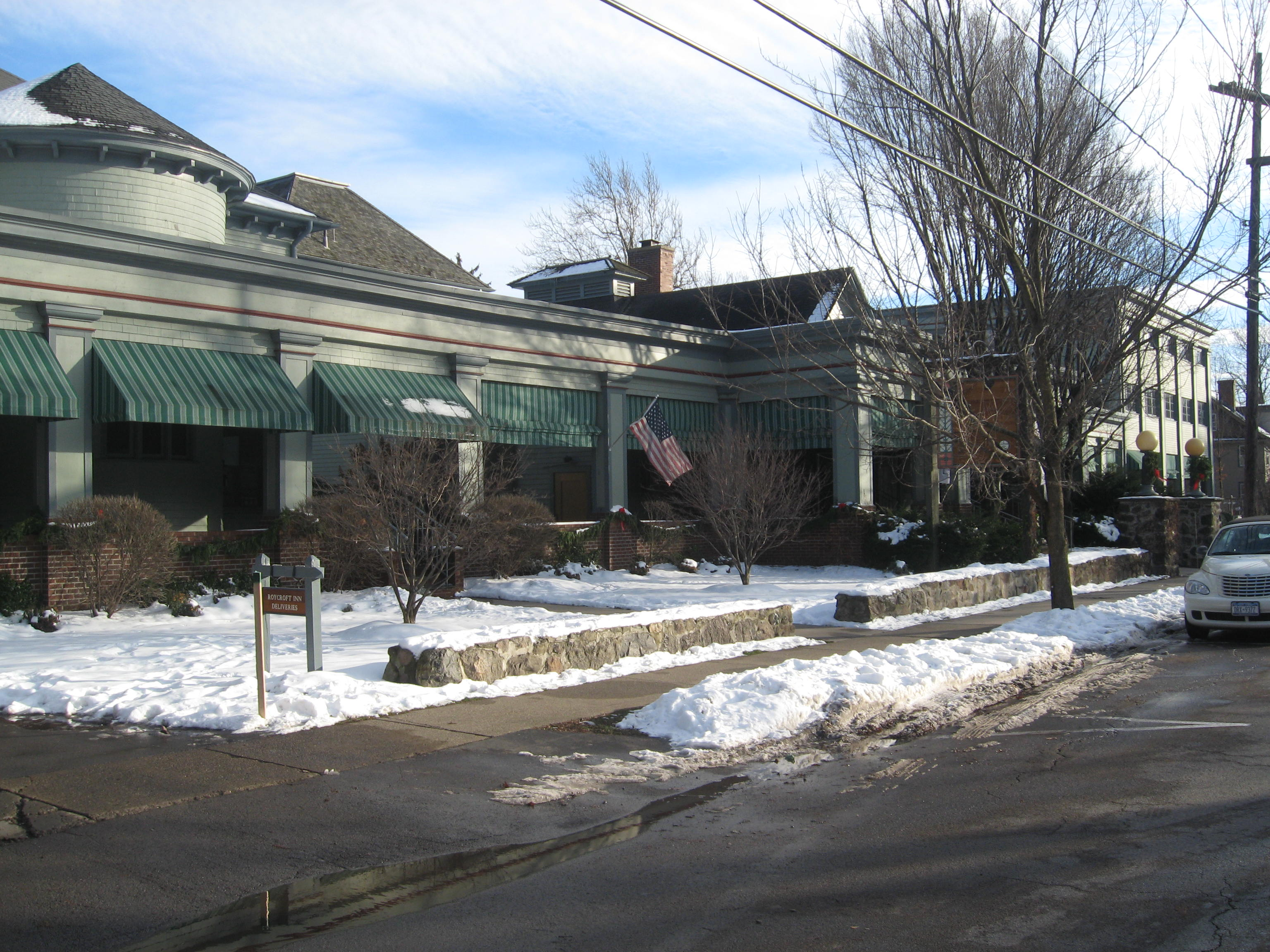
Roycroft Inn

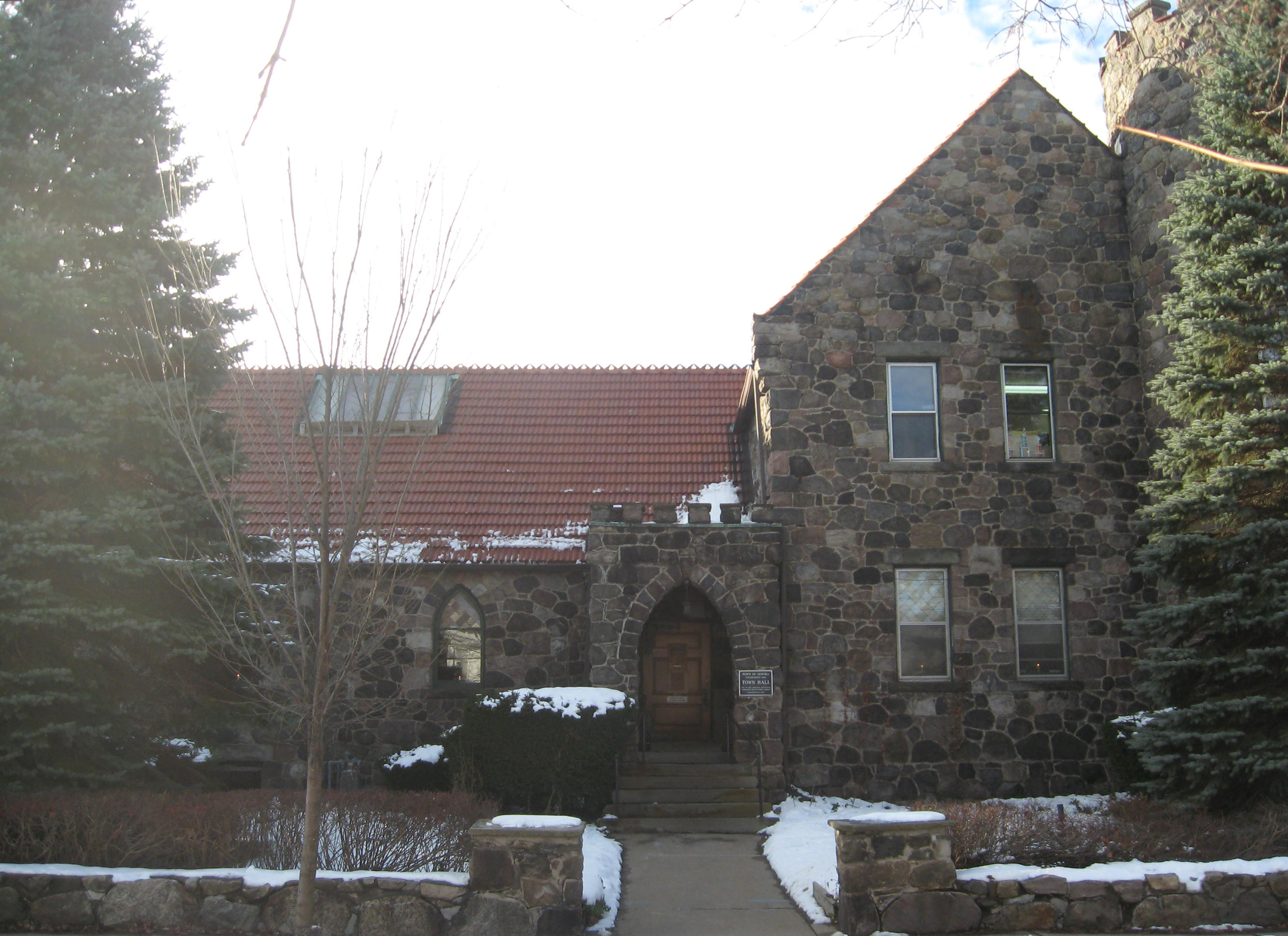
Side of the Chapel

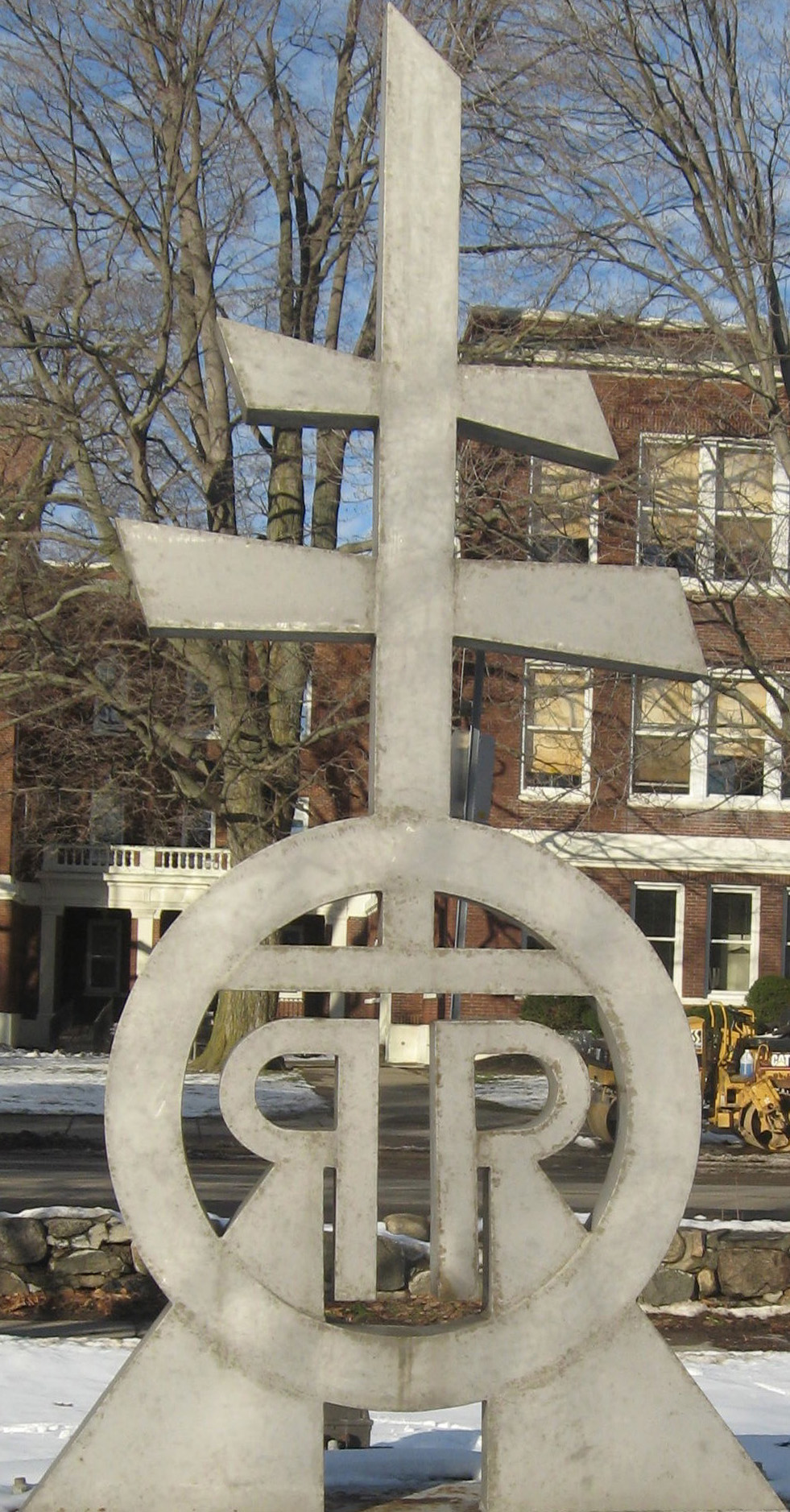
The Roycroft Renaissance Logo

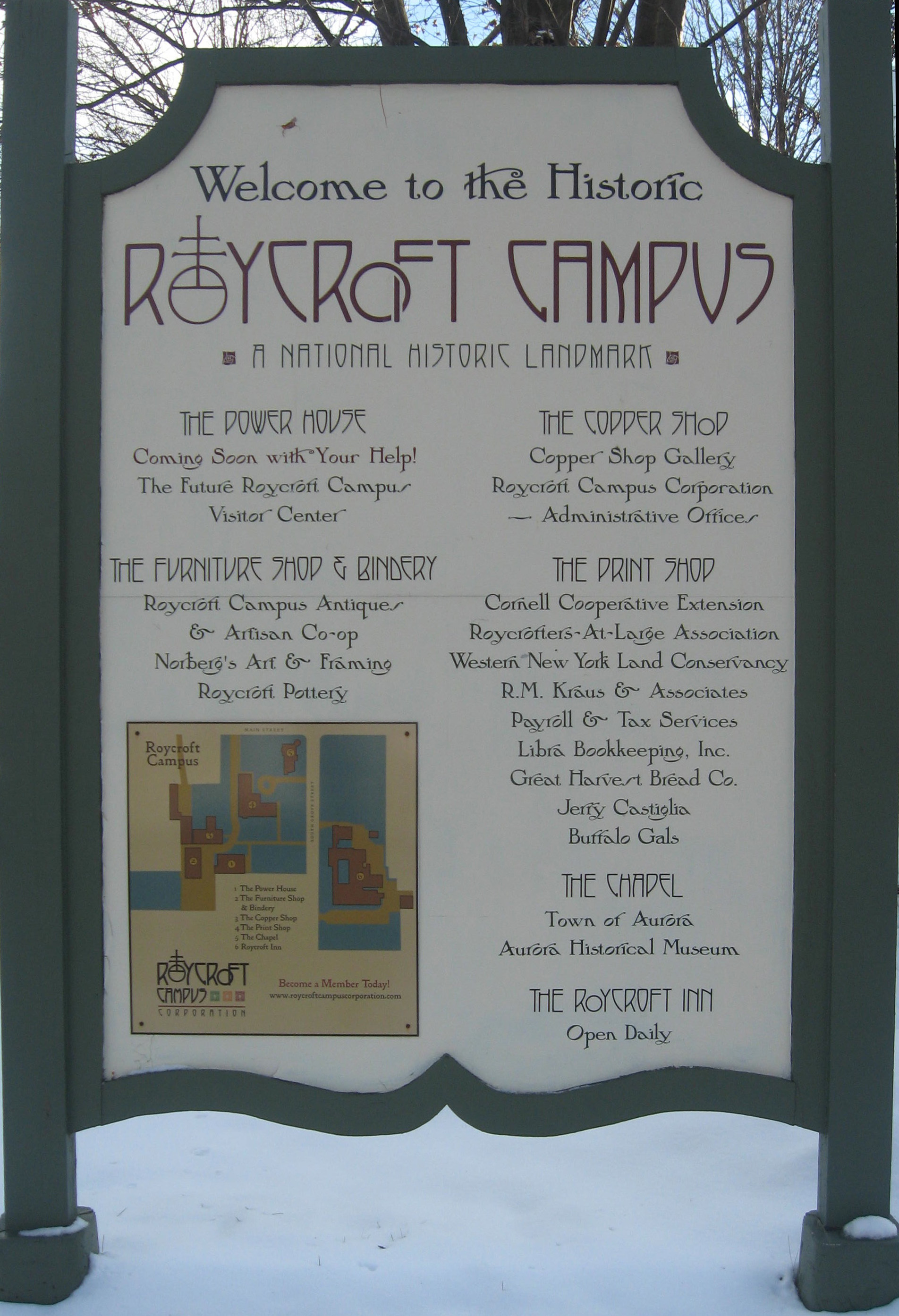
Roycroft Campus welcome sign from the 1990s

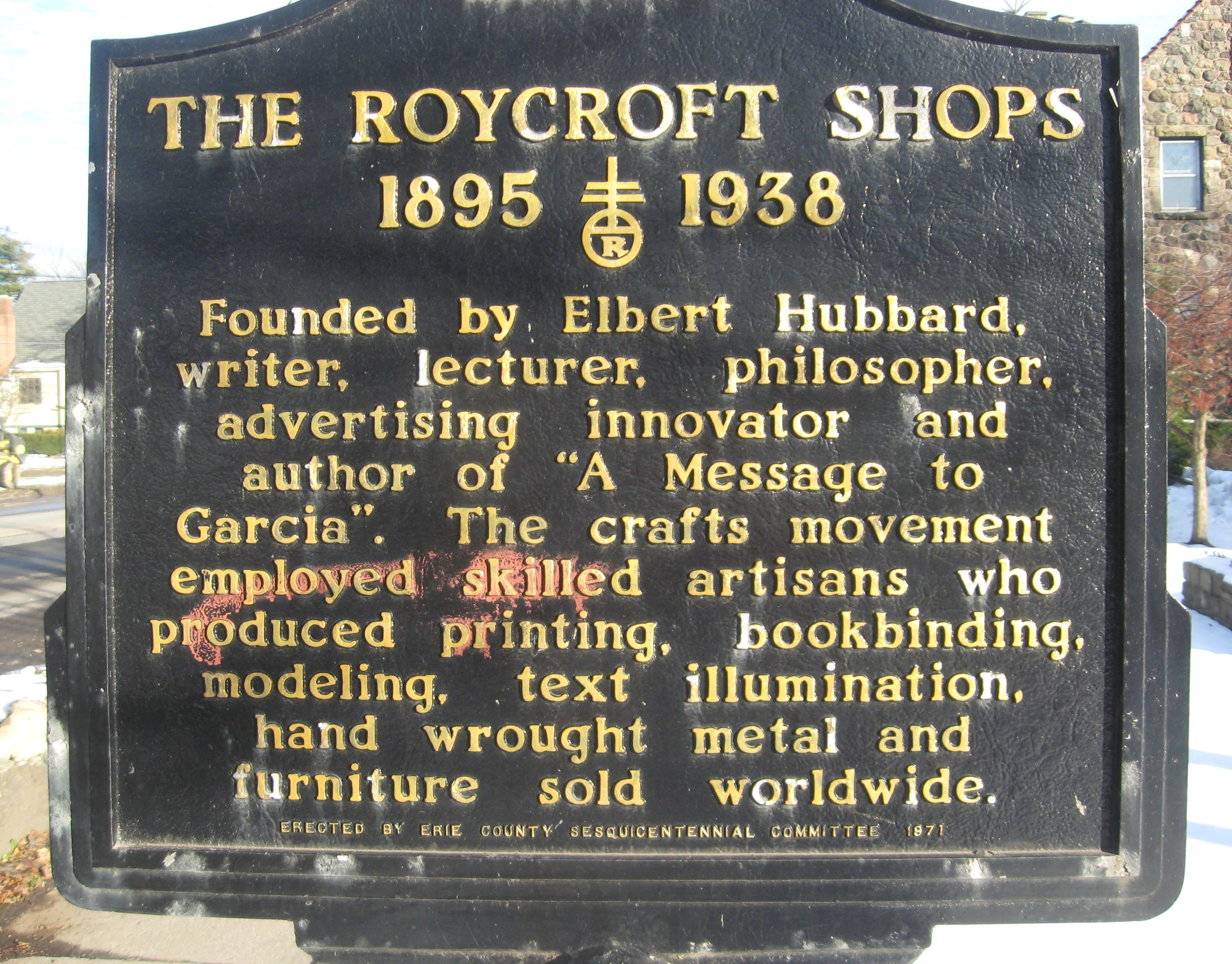
Sign about Elbert Hubbard

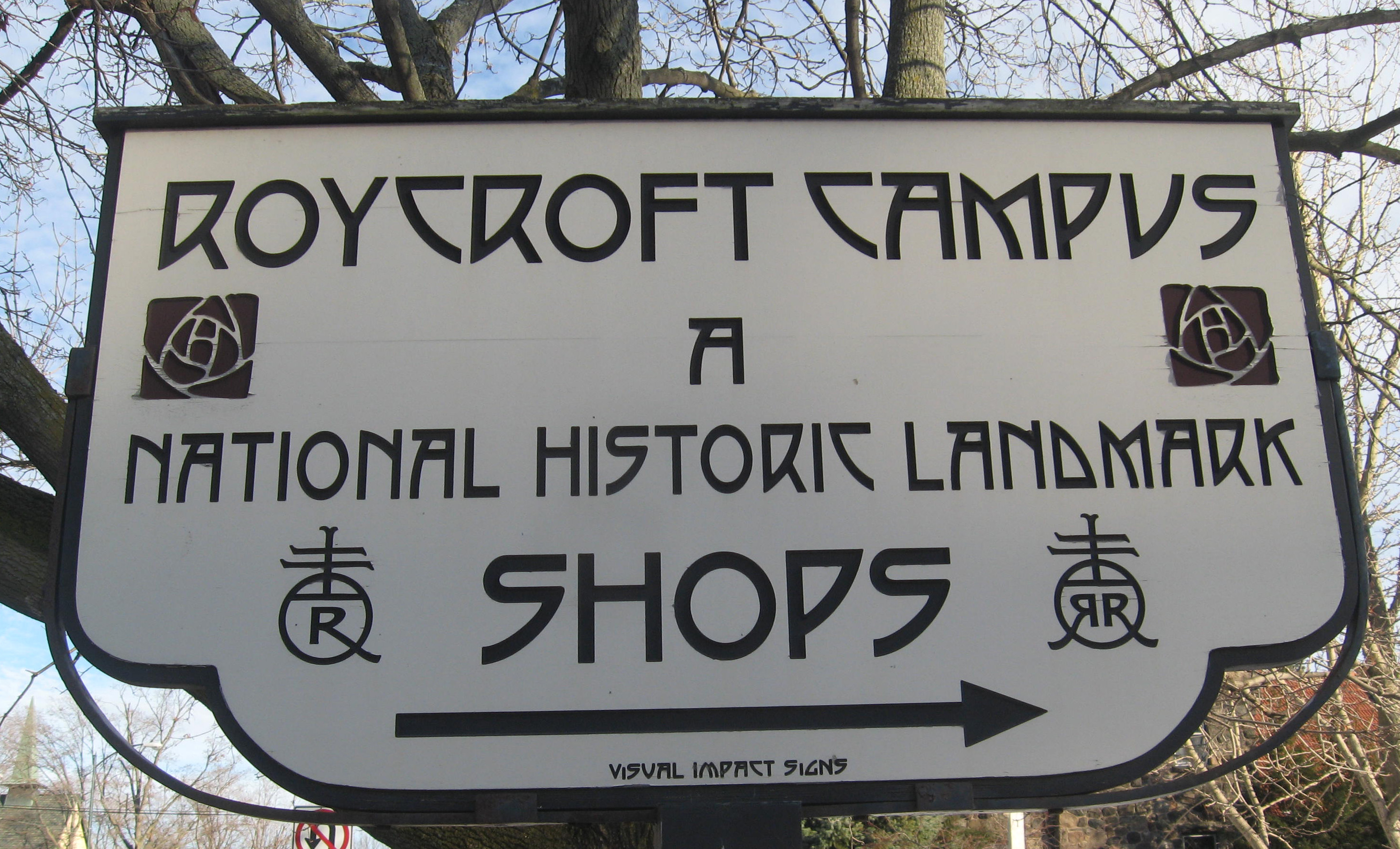
Sign with Roycroft crest and lettering

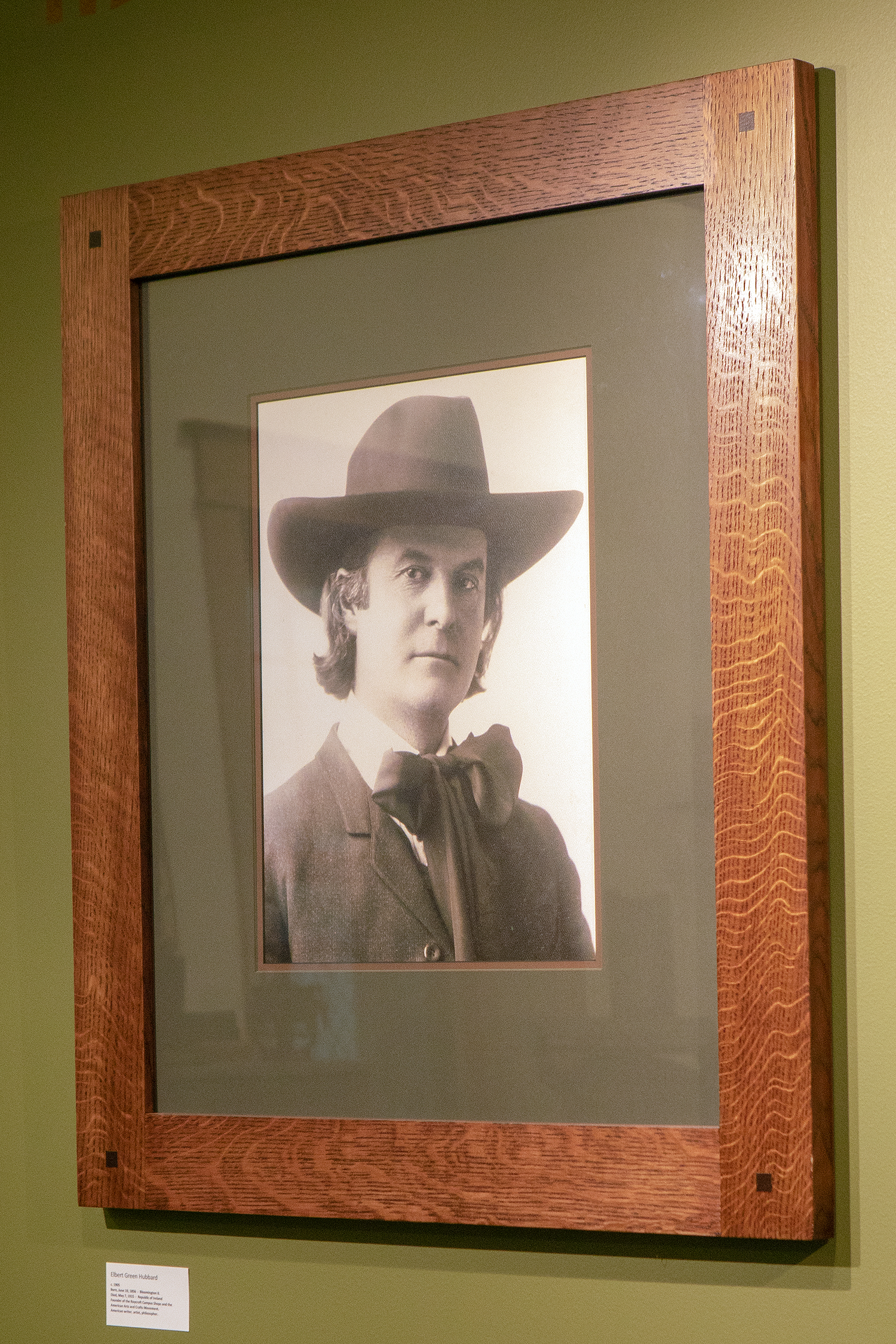
Portrait of Elbert Hubbard at the Visitor Center

== Famous Roycrofters ==
- Arthur H. Cole (1898–1973), coppersmith and later established the independent Avon Coppersmith.
- Jerome Connor (1874–1943), sculptor of Elbert Hubbard statue, North Wind on the Roycroft Chapel, and others.
- William Wallace Denslow (1856–1915), illustrator of The Wonderful Wizard of Oz.
- Alexis Jean Fournier (1865–1948), American painter, including 20 murals at the Roycroft Inn.
- William Joseph "Dard" Hunter (1883–1966), American authority on making paper by hand, as well as printing using handmade type. He published a number of books on traditional, pre-industrial, techniques for making paper.
- Walter Jennings, coppersmith and jeweler
- Karl Kipp (1882–1954), worked in the bindery in 1908 and later established the Roycroft Copper Shop.
- Fredrick Kranz, created fine leather goods.
- Victor Toothaker (1882–1932), coppersmith
- Samuel Warner (1871–1947), book designer, artist and illustrator for many Roycroft books.

== See also ==
- American craft
- Arden, Delaware
- Byrdcliffe Colony
- Elbert Hubbard
- Frank Lloyd Wright
- Gustav Stickley
- Rose Valley, Pennsylvania
- Roy Croft
