= William Headline =

American journalist (1931-2008)

William Headline (December 24, 1931 – October 20, 2008) served as Washington bureau chief for 12 years during the formative years of CNN and headed the Voter News Service during the United States 2000 presidential election. Given his name and his profession, Wolf Blitzer described Headline as having "the best name in news".

== Early life ==
William Headline was born in Cleveland, Ohio, and grew up in East Aurora, New York. The family surname had been Americanized by his Swedish immigrant ancestors. Headline attended Ohio Wesleyan University where he majored in geology. He was an intelligence officer in the United States Navy prior to his career in journalism.

== Career in journalism ==
He worked for Louis Harris and Associates in New York gathering polling information. CBS News in New York hired him to work on coverage of the 1964 presidential election. Headline was promoted to senior vice president and later moved to Washington in 1974 as the network's assistant bureau chief. In his years at CBS News, Headline supervised the network's coverage of political conventions, overseas presidential trips and papal visits, and was the network pool producer during President Richard Nixon's resignation.

Headline was hired by CNN in 1983, and was appointed as the network's bureau chief in Washington, D.C., filling a position that had been occupied by six different individuals in the three years before he was hired. As bureau chief, Headline oversaw the growth of CNN Washington bureau from 80 to 350 staff members. He remained as bureau chief until 1996, when CNN named him to serve as the vice president managing special projects and pool assignments.

He served as the chairman of the Washington-based Radio and Television Correspondents' Association.

Headline left CNN in 1998 and became the executive director of the Voter News Service, a consortium of television networks and newspapers that used exit polling and vote tallies to project election winners. The organization faced criticism after the United States 2000 presidential election, when it incorrectly projected that Vice President Al Gore had won the election. Headline was quoted in 2001 stating that "We were aware some of the computer hardware we have was antiquated", but that "it was actually a good night" when the number of races it projected correctly are considered. The Voter News Service was shut down in January 2003 after it was unable to fix its problems; Headline stated that two years "was much too ambitious" a timeframe for the organization to solve its issues.

== Death ==
Headline died on October 20, 2008, at age 76 after falling in his home in Bethesda, Maryland.
