= East Aurora, New York =

- Village
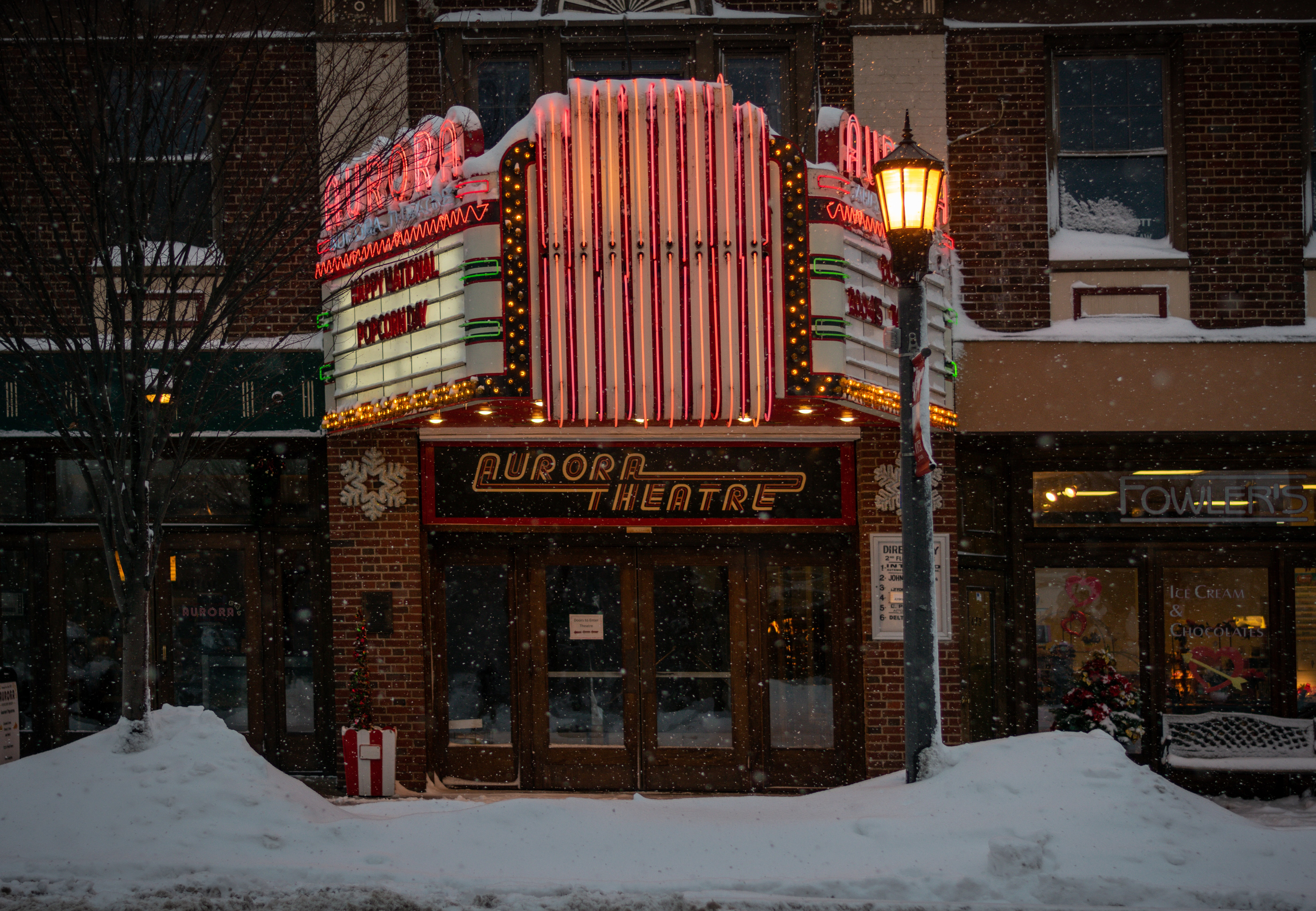
- The Aurora Theatre from Main Street

- Seal

- Location in Erie County and the state of New York.
- Coordinates: 42°46′1″N 78°37′2″W
- Country: United States
- State: New York
- County: Erie
- Town: Aurora

Area
  - Total: 2.52 sq mi (6.53 km^{2})
  - Land: 2.51 sq mi (6.50 km^{2})
  - Water: 0.012 sq mi (0.03 km^{2})
- Elevation: 920 ft (280 m)

Population (2020)
  - Total: 5,998
  - Density: 2,389/sq mi (922.3/km^{2})
- Time zone: UTC-5 (Eastern (EST))
  - Summer (DST): UTC-4 (EDT)
- ZIP code: 14052
- Area codes: 716, 585
- FIPS code: 36-21589
- GNIS feature ID: 0948967
- Website: www.eastaurora.gov

East Aurora is a village in Erie County, New York, United States, southeast of Buffalo. It lies in the eastern half of the town of Aurora. The village population was 5,998 per the 2020 census. It is part of the Buffalo–Niagara Falls metropolitan area. In 2015, East Aurora was rated the third-best town to raise a family in New York State by Niche. According to the National Council of Home Safety and Security, it is also among the safest places to live in New York State. The village is included on the List of Tree Cities USA.

== History ==
The village was founded in 1804, and incorporated in 1874.

Prior to becoming President of the United States, Millard Fillmore lived in East Aurora with his wife Abigail from 1826 to 1830. The house he built there while practicing law in the beginning of his political career is currently maintained by the Aurora Historical Society. The 1825 structure is restored to that period and features some original Fillmore furniture of the era, as well as items from Fillmore's presidential years. The home is currently located at 24 Shearer Avenue in the village of East Aurora.

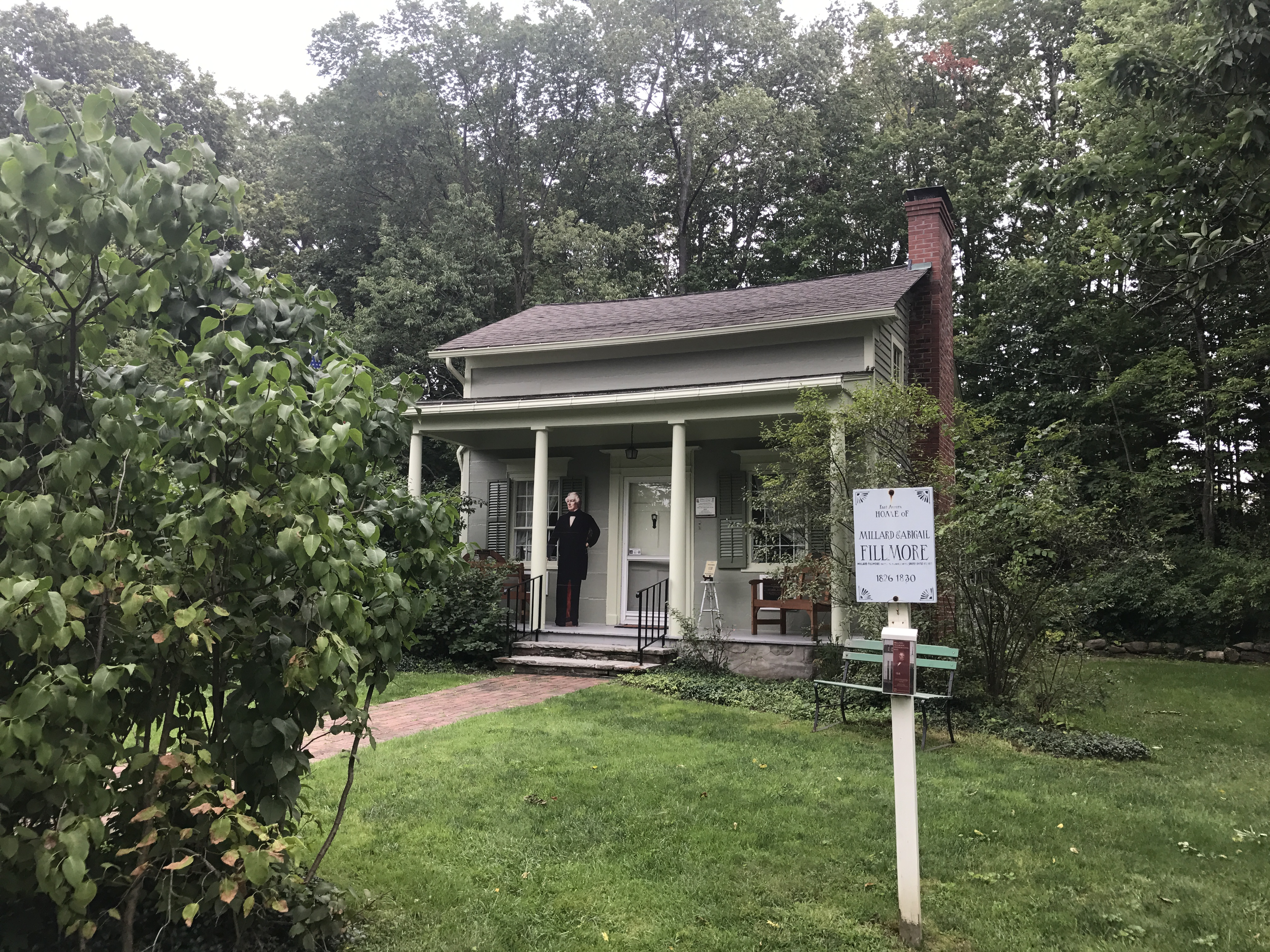
Millard Fillmore Presidential Site

The founder of the Roycroft Movement, Elbert Hubbard, also lived there during the turn of the twentieth century. Hubbard and his wife died on board the RMS Lusitania in 1915. One of the town's most famous landmarks, the Roycroft Inn, was converted from the Hubbards' original print shop and opened as an inn in 1905 to accommodate the influx of famous visitors attracted by Hubbard's ideas as well as the books, Mission-style furniture and metalware produced by the 500 Roycroft artisans on the South Grove Street Roycroft campus. The Roycroft Campus was granted National Landmark Status in 1986. The Roycroft Inn was re-opened in June 1995 through the support of the Margaret L. Wendt Foundation. The inn was completely restored and is open to the public for dining and accommodations. The Elbert Hubbard Museum on Oakwood Avenue features an extensive collection of Roycroft books and Arts & Crafts pieces.

East Aurora is also the birthplace of and home to the corporate headquarters for Fisher-Price. From 1987 through 2007 the village and the Toy Town Museum (an independent non-profit organization located on the Fisher-Price campus) held the Toyfest Festival, which included the Toyfest parade featuring giant replicas of classic Fisher-Price toys. The three-day event was usually held at Hamlin Park and included an amusement park, circus-like attractions and a Fisher-Price play area where young children could play with a variety of toys.

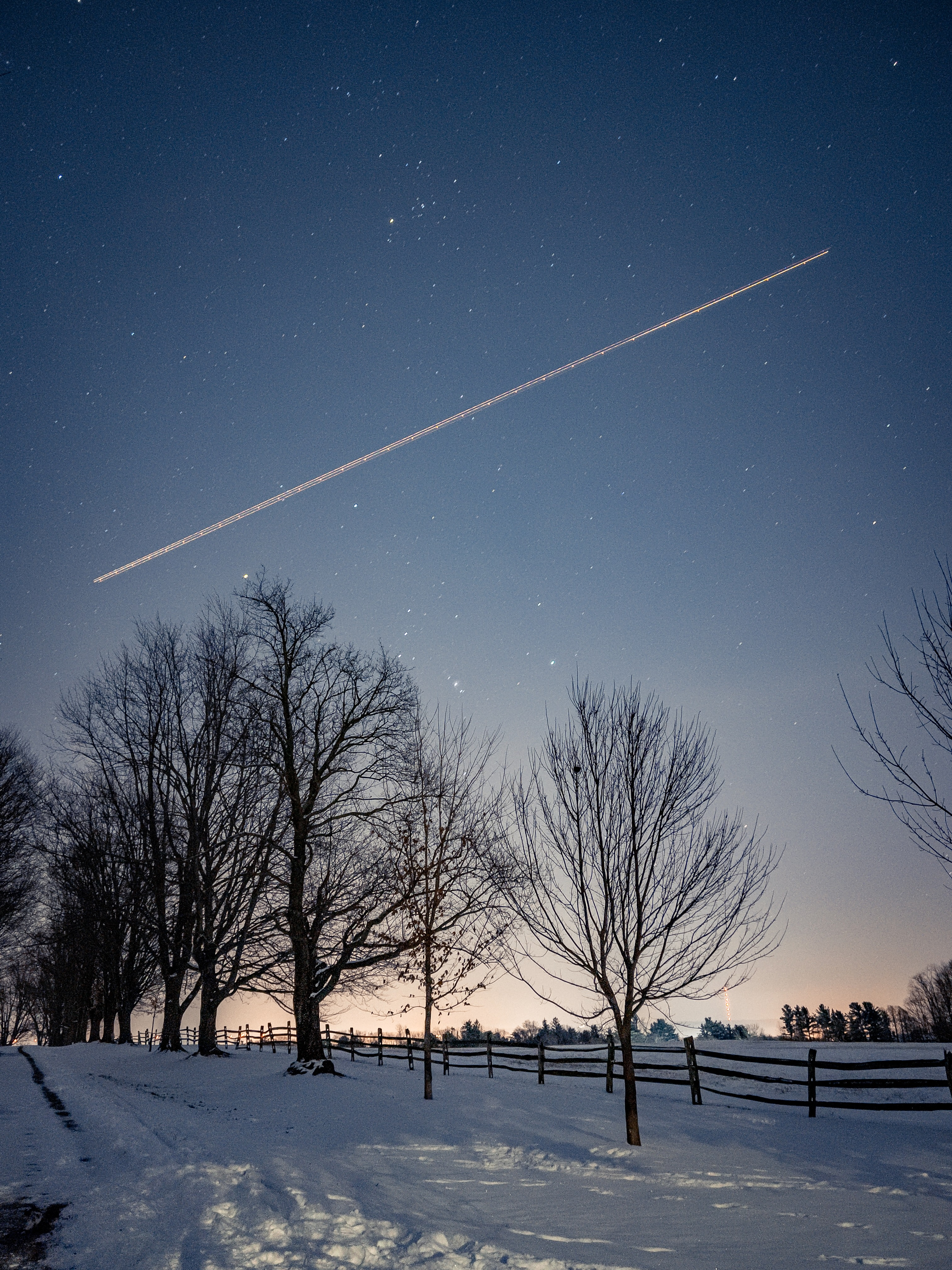
Night view of Knox Farm from Willardshire Road

The town was the home of the inaugural owner of the NHL franchise Buffalo Sabres, Seymour H. Knox III. The Knox Estates, now known as Knox Farm, is a 633-acre (2.56 km^{2}) New York state park. It is located on the northwest edge of the village.

The Millard Fillmore House, George and Gladys Scheidemantel House, and Roycroft Campus are listed on the National Register of Historic Places. The Adams family were the first settlers to stay a winter in East Aurora in 1804 and the family farm still stands today on Olean Road.

== Contemporary issues ==
East Aurora was one of the first communities to successfully block a Walmart store, in 1995 and again in 1999. The act was led by a community group in an attempt to preserve the small town values, and help support privately owned businesses. Wegmans also attempted to come to East Aurora, but it was blocked by Tops, a grocery store in East Aurora.

== Geography ==
East Aurora is located at 42°46′1″N 78°37′2″W (42.766809, -78.617121).

According to the United States Census Bureau, the village has a total area of 2.5 square miles (6.5 km^{2}), all land.

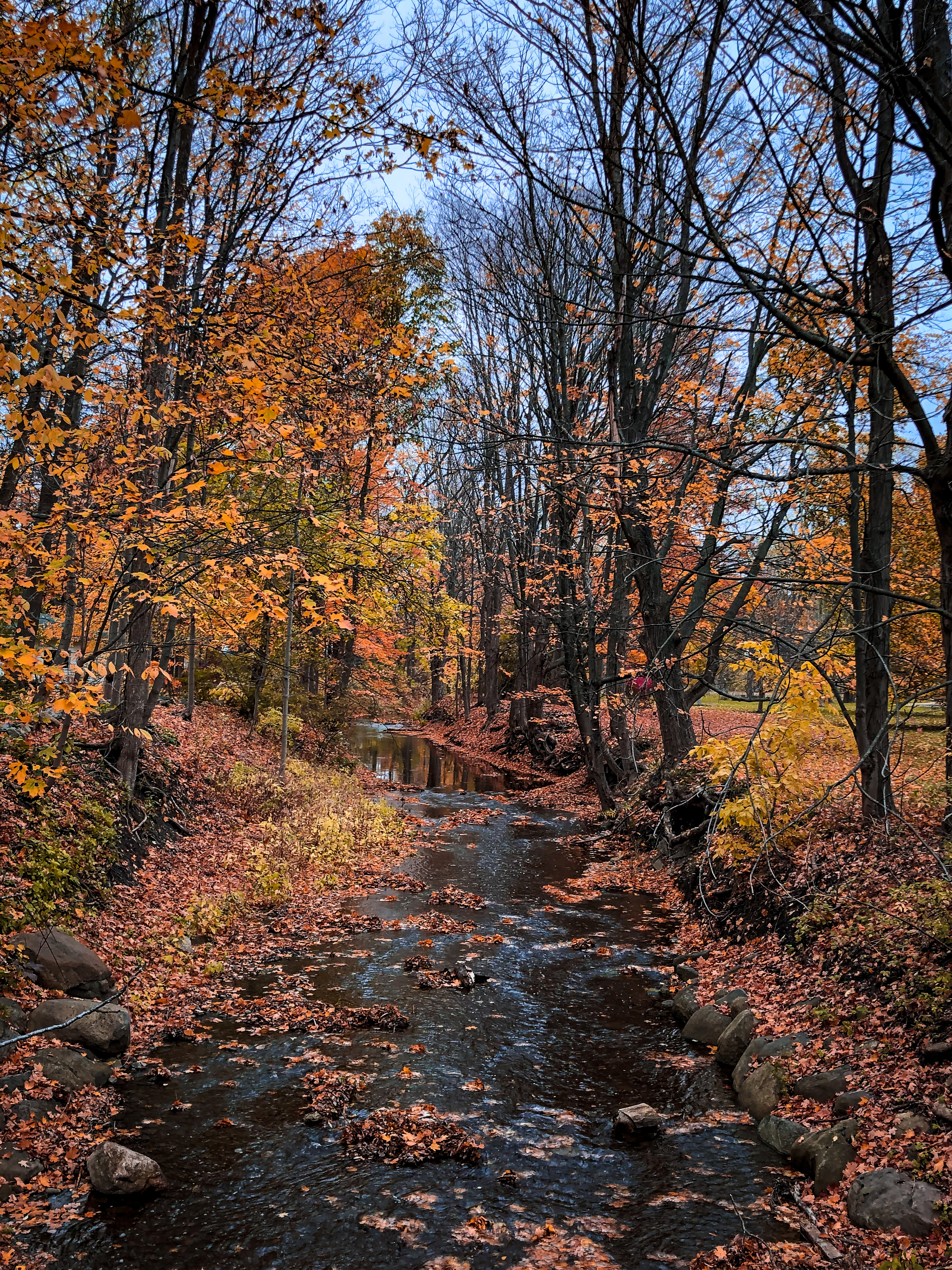
View of Tannery Brook from Maple

Main Street in the village is U.S. Route 20A, New York State Route 16, and New York State Route 78.

The East Branch of Cazenovia Creek flows through the south portion of the village.

=== Points of interest ===
Main Street in East Aurora is lined with a variety of specialty shops, restaurants, churches, municipal buildings and carefully preserved homes. Businesses include The East Aurora Advertiser, the community newspaper since 1872, which has occupied its Main St. office for more than 100 years. On Riley Street sits the East Aurora Classic Rink, which was created by the Aurora Ice Association. The rink’s components such as the boards, glass and refrigeration system were purchased by the Aurora Ice Association and is the same equipment used in the 2008 NHL Winter Classic between the Buffalo Sabres and the Pittsburgh Penguins. Included on the National Register of Historic Places listings in Erie County, New York are seven locations in the village.

== Demographics ==
Historical population
Census	Pop.	Note	%±
1880	1,109		—
1890	1,582		42.7%
1900	2,366		49.6%
1910	2,781		17.5%
1920	3,703		33.2%
1930	4,815		30.0%
1940	5,253		9.1%
1950	5,962		13.5%
1960	6,791		13.9%
1970	7,033		3.6%
1980	6,803		−3.3%
1990	6,647		−2.3%
2000	6,673		0.4%
2010	6,236		−6.5%
2020	5,998		−3.8%
U.S. Decennial Census

=== 2020 census ===
As of the 2020 census, East Aurora had a population of 5,998. The median age was 45.2 years. 20.8% of residents were under the age of 18 and 22.6% of residents were 65 years of age or older. For every 100 females there were 90.8 males, and for every 100 females age 18 and over there were 88.3 males age 18 and over.

100.0% of residents lived in urban areas, while 0.0% lived in rural areas.

There were 2,535 households in East Aurora, of which 29.3% had children under the age of 18 living in them. Of all households, 47.9% were married-couple households, 17.2% were households with a male householder and no spouse or partner present, and 29.0% were households with a female householder and no spouse or partner present. About 32.3% of all households were made up of individuals and 14.9% had someone living alone who was 65 years of age or older.

There were 2,701 housing units, of which 6.1% were vacant. The homeowner vacancy rate was 0.8% and the rental vacancy rate was 5.4%.

Racial composition as of the 2020 census
Race	Number	Percent
White	5,729	95.5%
Black or African American	21	0.4%
American Indian and Alaska Native	11	0.2%
Asian	30	0.5%
Native Hawaiian and Other Pacific Islander	1	0.0%
Some other race	29	0.5%
Two or more races	177	3.0%
Hispanic or Latino (of any race)	89	1.5%

== Schools ==
Children living in the village of East Aurora attend Parkdale Elementary (grades K–4), East Aurora Middle School (grades 5–8), and East Aurora High School (grades 9–12). Children living in the Town of Aurora attend the same public schools, with the notable exception of children living on Highland Drive in the Town of Aurora who attend the Iroquois Central School District due to a decision made in the 1960s. Immaculate Conception Catholic School (grades K-8) is the parochial and the Mandala school, a school that incorporates democratic and hands-on learning, are the alternatives. Children from the ages of one through four can attend nursery school on the Fisher Price campus, at the Duck Duck Goose Childcare Center or at some of the churches in East Aurora. Another option is the East Aurora Montessori School for ages two through five. The former Sprouting Minds Montessori School, which was a school for infants through sixth grade, was located in the Town of Aurora near the West Falls borderline. Although not in East Aurora, the Aurora Waldorf School is a nearby option in West Falls providing an alternative Waldorf education to children from infancy through eighth grade.

In 2008 and 2009 additions and renovations totaling $24 million were made to the district's schools to address space and maintenance issues. Prior to 2009 students attended Parkdale Elementary in grades K–2, and Main Street Elementary for grades 3–8. Elements of the Roycroft style influenced the design of Parkdale Elementary's new entrance.

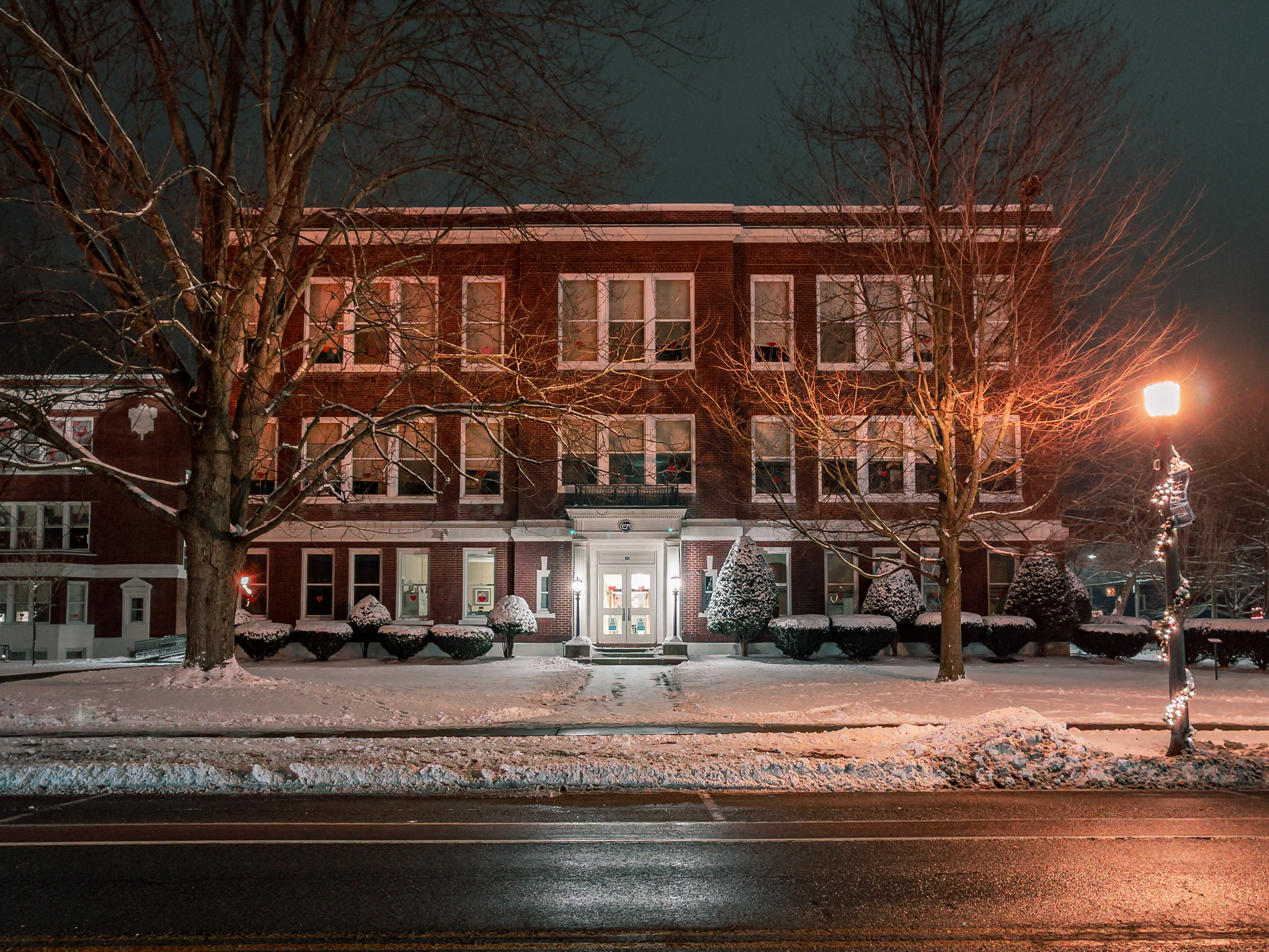
East Aurora Middle School from Main Street

The East Aurora Union Free School District gained approval on January 25, 2011, to begin contracting a roof repair project at the high school that would take place over the summer of 2011. The project did not have any tax impact on the community as it used funds from the district's emergency building repair fund and New York State Building Aid. The work was scheduled to begin on June 27, 2011.

East Aurora Schools have been recognized by the National Blue Ribbon Schools Program, administered by the United States Department of Education. The Middle School in 2012 and the high school in 2017.

The U.S. News & World Report ranked the East Aurora high school #2 in Buffalo, NY Metro Area High Schools.

== Notable people ==
- Randall James Bayer, botanist
- Merritt C. Buxton, U.S. National Champion jockey
- Julie Byrne, singer-songwriter
- Christine Estabrook, actress
- Margaret Evans Price, illustrator, co-founder of Fisher-Price
- Abigail Fillmore, former First Lady of the United States
- Millard Fillmore, 13th President of the United States of America
- Alexis Jean Fournier, painter and art director of Roycroft arts
- William Headline, former Washington bureau chief for CNN
- Elbert Hubbard, writer, publisher, artist, philosopher, and founder of the Roycroft artist community; died aboard the sinking of the RMS Lusitania on May 7, 1915.
- Jeremy Jacobs, owner of the Boston Bruins
- Emily Janiga, Professional Hockey player for the NWHL Buffalo Beauts
- Seymour H. Knox III, original owner of the Buffalo Sabres
- Joseph McKeen Morrow, Wisconsin state assemblyman
- Henry H. Persons, banker, businessman, New York State Senator.
- Irving Price, co-founder of Fisher-Price and former mayor of East Aurora
- Helen Schelle, co-founder of Fisher-Price
- James Schuyler, New York School poet, moved to East Aurora with his family when he was 15 (the town is the setting for two of his poems, "The Morning of the Poem" and "A Few Days")
- Albert Sharpe, All-American college football player
- Luke Tasker, CFL wide receiver
- Joe Slade White, political strategist

== Art ==
East Aurora has been home to a number of regional landscape painters, most notably Carl W. Illig (1910-1987), who grew up and lived in the village for nearly all of his life. He painted landscape scenes along Cazenovia Creek, and fields and hills around East Aurora, in all seasons. His paintings are found in many homes in the village and surrounding towns.

== Economy ==
Astronics is based in East Aurora.

East Aurora is home to the corporate headquarters of Moog, Inc. Moog is a designer and manufacturer of motion and fluid controls and control systems for applications in aerospace, defense, industrial and medical devices. The company operates under three segments: aircraft controls, space and defense controls, and industrial systems.

== Cultural references ==
- In the Whit Stillman movie Metropolitan, Nick Smith (played by Chris Eigeman) says that he will soon be taking a train to East Aurora, where he will meet his "stepmother of untrammeled malevolence, quite possibly to be murdered."
- A Prince for Christmas was filmed in the village of East Aurora and premiered on the ION network on November 29, 2015.
- A Christmas in Vermont was filmed in the village of East Aurora and other locations entirely in western NY. It premiered on the ION network on November 27, 2016.
- Cold Brook was directed by William Fichtner was filmed in the village of East Aurora and other locations in Western NY. The movie was released October 15, 2018.
- Holiday Touchdown: A Bills Love Story was directed by Dustin Rikert was filmed in the village of East Aurora and other locations in Western NY. The movie was released November 22, 2025 on the Hallmark Channel.
