= George and Gladys Scheidemantel House =

Historic house in New York, United States

- U.S. National Register of Historic Places
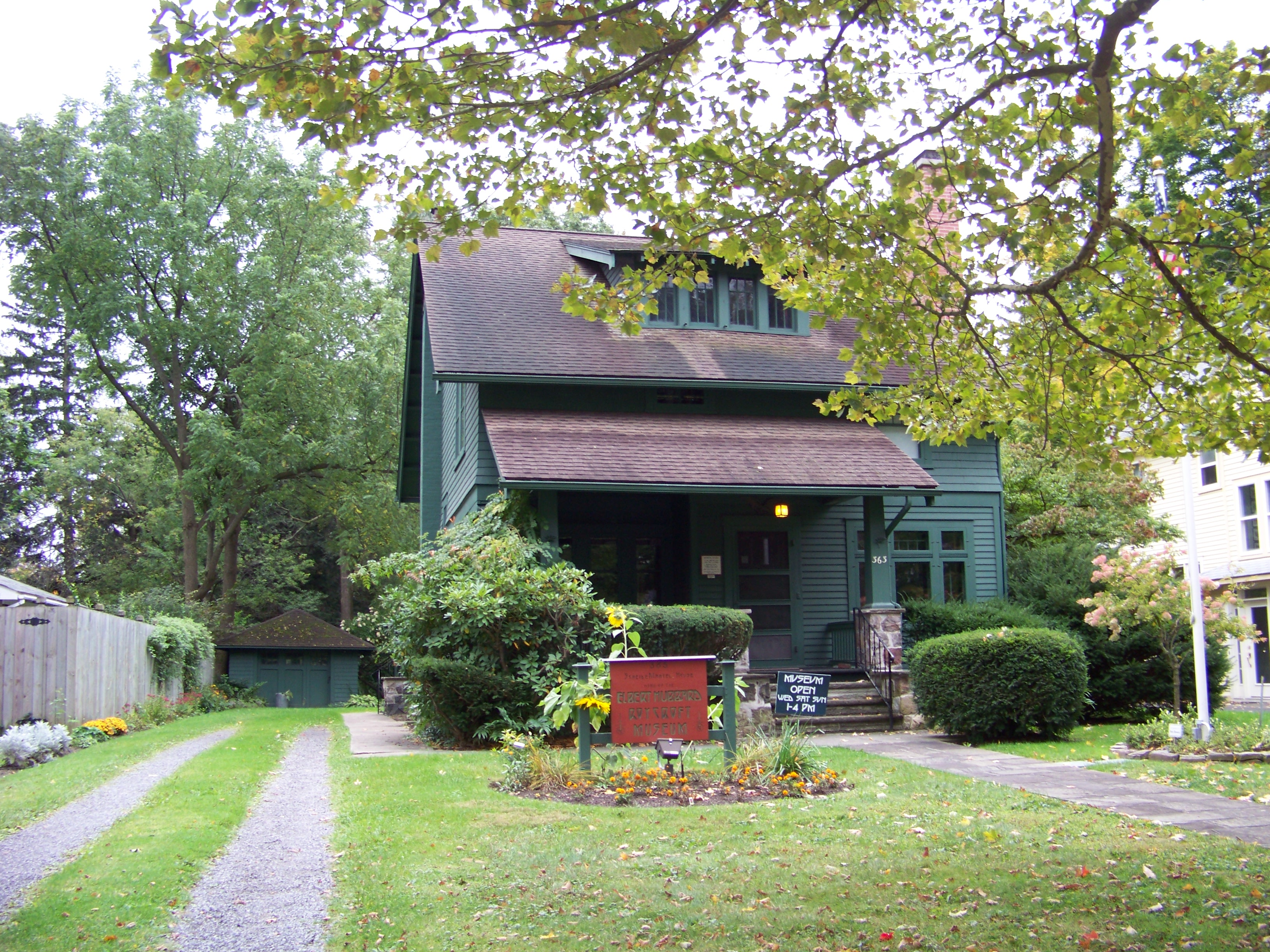
- Elbert Hubbard Roycroft Museum, October 2009

- Location within New York Location within the United States
- Location: 363 Oakwood Ave., East Aurora, New York
- Coordinates: 42°45′56″N 78°37′18″W
- Area: less than one acre
- Built: 1910
- Architect: Roth, William
- Architectural style: Bungalow/Craftsman
- Website: Elbert Hubbard Roycroft Museum website
- NRHP reference No.: 93000778
- Added to NRHP: August 5, 1993

George and Gladys Scheidemantel House is a historic home located at East Aurora in Erie County, New York. It is a locally distinctive example of the Arts and Crafts movement style of architecture built in 1910. It is a two-story, frame, bungalow that combines elements of the American Foursquare and Craftsman styles. George Scheidemantel was for a time head of the Roycroft Leather Shop and the house designer, William Roth, was head Roycroft carpenter.

The house now serves as The Elbert Hubbard Roycroft Museum. The museum features furniture and decorative items produced by the Roycroft community.

It was listed on the National Register of Historic Places in 1993.
