= Roy Croft =

Literary pseudonym

Roy Croft (or Ray Croft) is a pseudonym frequently credited with writing a poem titled "Love" that begins "I love you not only for what you are, but for what I am when I am with you." The poem, which is frequently quoted in Christian wedding speeches and other readings, is actually by Mary Carolyn Davies. It was originally published in the Epworth Herald on October 26, 1918 with the title "To a Friend". It was misattributed to the pseudonym "Roy Croft" in a 1936 anthology entitled Best Loved Poems of American People edited by Hazel Felleman, and published by Doubleday (ISBN 0-385-00019-7) and appears without further attribution in The Family Book of Best Loved Poems, edited by David L. George and published in 1952 by Doubleday & Company, Inc., then of Garden City, New York. Felleman corrected the mistake in her column for the New York Times Book Review, "Queries and Answers", in 1943, where she noted that "Davies is a resident of New York City and is the author of 'Love,' a poem that has been erroneously attributed to Roy Croft." Erich Fried translated the poem into German.

The poem is also known as "Why Do I Love You?" and was popularized by WGN radio personality Franklyn MacCormack in the 1950s. It is the title poem of his anthology, Why Do I Love You? and Other Poems From my Old Book of Memories (1948). MacCormack recorded himself reciting the poem with the orchestral music of Hans Engelmann's "Melody of Love" in 1943. It sold more than 4 million copies.
