= List of cemeteries in New York City =

Although human burials in the area that would become New York City predate European colonial times, the first documented burial in New York City may have been that of English sailor John Colman in 1609 (whose actual burial site is lost to history).

In 1847, the Rural Cemetery Act authorized commercial burial grounds in rural New York state, and in 1852 the Common Council of New York City passed a law prohibiting new burials in the city (which at that time consisted only of Manhattan Island). The two laws caused many cemeteries in Manhattan to be demolished, and spurred the development of a large number of cemeteries in what was then empty land in Queens and Brooklyn, creating a region often called the "Cemetery Belt".

Hundreds of formalized burial locations have been established and disestablished in New York City; one 2020 research effort identified over 500 such sites. The cemeteries listed here should be limited to those satisfying general notability guidelines.

== Manhattan ==
- African Burial Ground National Monument, Civic Center
- First Shearith Israel Graveyard (Chatham Square Cemetery), Chinatown
- New York Marble Cemetery, East Village, the oldest non-sectarian cemetery in New York City.
- Saint Bartholomew's Episcopal Church, Midtown Manhattan
- St. John's Burying Ground
- Second Shearith Israel Cemetery, West Village
- Third Shearith Israel Cemetery, Chelsea
- Trinity Churchyard, Lower Manhattan
- Trinity Church Cemetery and Mausoleum, Hamilton Heights
- Former potter's fields at the following locations:
  - Washington Square Park
  - Randalls and Wards Islands (one on each island)

== Brooklyn ==
- Flatbush African Burial Ground, Flatbush
- Flatbush Reformed Dutch Church Cemetery, Flatbush
- Green-Wood Cemetery, western Brooklyn
- Holy Cross Cemetery, East Flatbush
- Kings County Cemetery (also known as Kings County Farm Cemetery and Potter's Field), East Flatbush
- Maimonides Cemetery, Cypress Hills
- Most Holy Trinity Cemetery (Brooklyn), Bushwick
- Mount Hope Cemetery, Cypress Hills
- New Lots Reformed Church Cemetery, East New York
- Old Gravesend Cemetery, Gravesend
- Salem Fields Cemetery, Cypress Hills
- Washington Cemetery, Mapleton

== Brooklyn and Queens ==
- Beth Olam Cemetery, Cypress Hills
- Cemetery of the Evergreens, at the border of Bushwick and Cypress Hills
- Cypress Hills Cemetery, Cypress Hills
- Cypress Hills National Cemetery, Cypress Hills

== Queens ==
- Acacia Cemetery, Ozone Park
- Bayside Cemetery, Ozone Park
- Calvary Cemetery, Woodside
- Cedar Grove Cemetery, Flushing
- Flushing Cemetery, Flushing
- Linden Hill United Methodist Cemetery, Ridgewood
- Linden Hill Jewish Cemetery, Ridgewood
- Lutheran All Faiths Cemetery, Middle Village
- Machpelah Cemetery, Ridgewood
- Maple Grove Cemetery, Kew Gardens
- Mokom Sholom Cemetery, Ozone Park
- Montefiore Cemetery, Springfield Gardens
- Moore-Jackson Cemetery, Woodside
- Mount Carmel Cemetery, Glendale
- Mount Hebron Cemetery, Flushing
- Mount Lebanon Cemetery, Ridgewood
- Mount Zion Cemetery (Elmweir), Maspeth
- Remsen Cemetery, Middle Village
- St. George Churchyard Cemetery, Astoria
- St. John Cemetery, Middle Village
- St. Michael's Cemetery, East Elmhurst
- Churchyard of Zion Episcopal Church, Douglaston-Little Neck

== The Bronx ==
- Fordham University Cemetery, on the Fordham University campus
- Potter's field at Hart Island
- Pelham Cemetery, City Island]
- St. Peter's Church, Chapel, and Cemetery, Westchester Square
- Saint Raymond's Cemetery, Throggs Neck
- West Farms Soldiers Cemetery, West Farms
- Woodlawn Cemetery, Woodlawn

== Staten Island ==
- Baron Hirsch Cemetery, Graniteville
- Cemetery of the Resurrection, South Shore
- Cherry Lane Cemetery, Westerleigh
- Frederick Douglass Memorial Park, Oakwood Heights
- Moravian Cemetery, New Dorp
- Mount Richmond Cemetery (second cemetery of the Hebrew Free Burial Association), Richmondtown
- Ocean View Cemetery, Richmondtown
- Reformed Church on Staten Island Cemetery, Port Richmond
- St. Andrew's Churchyard, Richmondtown
- St. Joseph's Churchyard, Rossville
- Saint Peter's Cemetery, West New Brighton
- Silver Lake Cemetery (first cemetery of the Hebrew Free Burial Association), Silver Lake
- United Hebrew Cemetery, Richmondtown
- Vanderbilt Family Cemetery and Mausoleum, New Dorp

== See also ==
- 1973 New York City gravediggers' strike
- List of cemeteries in New York
- List of cemeteries in the United States
