= List of Jewish cemeteries in New York City =

This is a list of Jewish cemeteries in New York City. Non-sectarian cemeteries in which Jews are buried are not included in this list.

Name	Borough	Neighborhood	Opened	Closed	Website	Image	Ref.
Acacia Cemetery	Queens	Ozone Park	1891	No	—		
Baron Hirsch Cemetery	Staten Island	Graniteville	1899	No	Yes		
Bayside Cemetery	Queens	Ozone Park	1865	No	—		
Beth El Cemetery	Queens	Ridgewood	1864	No	—		
Beth Olam Cemetery	Brooklyn and Queens	Cypress Hills	1851	No	Yes		
First Shearith Israel Graveyard	Manhattan	Two Bridges	1682	1833	–		
Linden Hill Jewish Cemetery	Queens	Ridgewood	1875	No	—		
Machpelah Cemetery	Queens	Ridgewood	1855	1980	–		
Maimonides Cemetery	Brooklyn	Cypress Hills	1853	1900	—		
Mokom Sholom Cemetery	Queens	Ozone Park	1864	No	—		
Old Montefiore Cemetery	Queens	Springfield Gardens	1908	No	Yes		
Mount Carmel Cemetery	Queens	Glendale	1906	No	Yes		
Mount Hebron Cemetery	Queens	Flushing	1909	No	Yes		
Mount Hope Cemetery	Brooklyn	Cypress Hills	1881	No	—		
Mount Judah Cemetery	Queens	Ridgewood	1908	No	Yes		
Mount Lebanon Cemetery	Queens	Glendale	1914	No	Yes		
Mount Neboh Cemetery	Queens	Glendale	1886	No	—		
Mount Richmond Cemetery	Staten Island	Richmondtown	1909	No	Yes		
Mount Zion Cemetery	Queens	Maspeth	1893	No	Yes		
Salem Fields Cemetery	Brooklyn	Cypress Hills	1852	1900	—		
Second Shearith Israel Cemetery	Manhattan	Greenwich Village	1805	1830	–		
Silver Lake Cemetery	Staten Island	Sunnyside	1892	No	Yes		
Third Shearith Israel Cemetery	Manhattan	Chelsea	1829	1851	–		
Union Field Cemetery	Queens	Ridgewood	1926	No	Yes		
United Hebrew Cemetery	Staten Island	Richmondtown	1908	No	Yes		
Washington Cemetery	Brooklyn	Mapleton	1850	No	—		

== See also ==
- History of the Jews in New York City
- List of cemeteries in New York
  - List of African-American cemeteries in New York
  - List of cemeteries in New York City
