= Maimonides Cemetery =

Jewish cemetery in Brooklyn, New York

- Interactive map of Maimonides Cemetery

Details
- Established: 1853
- Location: 895 Jamaica Ave. Brooklyn, NY
- Country: United States
- Coordinates: 40.6906072°N 73.8712699°W
- Type: Private Jewish cemetery
- Owned by: Maimonides Benevolent Society
- Size: 7.5 acres
- No. of interments: Over 1,700
- Website: https://www.maimonidescemetery.com/
- Find a Grave: Maimonides Cemetery

Maimonides Cemetery is a Jewish cemetery located in Cypress Hills, Brooklyn, within the Cemetery Belt and immediately adjacent to Cypress Hills Cemetery. It was established in 1853 by the Maimonides Benevolent Society. The organization now functions as a nonprofit and continues to conduct the cemetery's administration as well as that of a second location, also referred to as Maimonides Cemetery, in Elmont, New York. It is only accessible by appointment.

== Notable Burials ==
- Dorothy Fields (1904-1974), Broadway librettist and lyricist
- Israel F. Fischer (1858-1940), Congressman and judge
- Marcus Loew (1870-1927), motion picture industry magnate and creator of MGM Studios
- Joseph Schenck (1876-1961), film studio executive and founder of 20th Century Fox
