= Union Field Cemetery =

Jewish cemetery in Queens, New York

Details
- Established: 1878
- Location: 8211 Cypress Avenue, Ridgewood, Queens
- Country: United States
- Coordinates: 40.69134°N 73.88717°W
- Type: Jewish
- Owned by: Congregation Rodeph Sholom
- Find a Grave: Union Field Cemetery

Union Field Cemetery is a Jewish cemetery in Ridgewood, Queens, New York City. Located in the Cemetery Belt, it was chartered in 1846 and dedicated in 1878 and serves the Congregation Rodeph Sholom who purchased the plot of land.

== Notable burials ==
- Roy Cohn, lawyer and prosecutor who handled the case of Julius and Ethel Rosenberg
- Joshua Lionel Cowen, inventor; manufacturer of model railways
- Samuel Dickstein, politician and judge; United States representative from New York from 1923 to 1945, New York State Supreme Court Justice, and a Soviet spy
- Charles Frohman, theatre manager and producer; died in the sinking of the Lusitania during WWI
- Michael Furst, lawyer
- Henry M. Goldfogle, politician; United States representative from New York from 1901 to 1915
- Alan Hewitt, actor
- Samuel H. Hofstadter, lawyer and politician
- Jacob Joseph, Chief Rabbi of New York City
- Bert Lahr, actor and comedian
- Robert Lansing, actor
- Fredericka Mandelbaum, female crime boss in the mid to late 19th-century
- Israel Miller, founder of I. Miller & Co.
- Arnold Rothstein, crime boss in the early 20th-century
- Nahum Meir Schaikewitz, Yiddish and Hebrew novelist and playwright.
- Ludwig Teller, politician; United States representative from New York 1957 to 1961
- Susan Brandeis Gilbert, attorney and daughter of Louis Brandeis

== See also ==
- List of Jewish cemeteries in New York City
