= Machpelah Cemetery (Queens) =

Jewish cemetery in New York City

Coordinates: 40°41′38″N 73°53′11″W

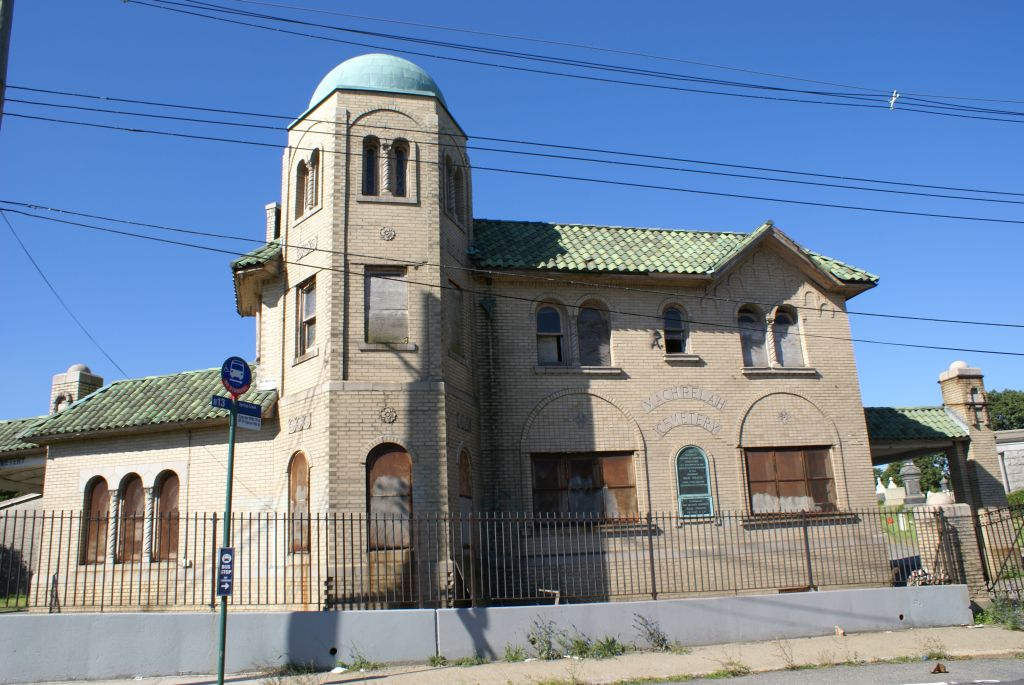
Machpelah Cemetery, Glendale

Machpelah Cemetery is a Jewish cemetery located within the Cemetery Belt in Glendale, Queens, in New York City. It was established around 1855. In addition to managing the 6-acre (2.4 ha) cemetery, the former Machpelah Cemetery Association also managed the adjacent Union Field Cemetery, New Union Field Cemetery and Hungarian Union Field Cemetery. Machpelah Cemetery was abandoned by the late 1980s. The deteriorating entrance building was demolished in 2013.

It is accessible by the New York City Subway's J train via the Cypress Hills station and the B13 New York City Bus.

== Houdini's grave ==
Machpelah Cemetery is the final resting place of magician Harry Houdini, his brother Theodore Hardeen, his mother, father, grandfather, four other brothers, and a sister. Houdini's widow Bess, who died of a heart attack in 1943, had wished to be buried next to her husband, but instead was interred 35 miles north at the Gate of Heaven Cemetery in Westchester County, as her Catholic family refused to allow her to be buried in a Jewish cemetery and as well as Machpelah's rule forbidding non-Jews to be buried there.

During October 1969, the 43rd anniversary of Houdini's death was celebrated on Halloween by The Spellbinder, the Society of American Magicians. Among the members of the society's New York Chapter were one-hundred Long Island magicians, who went to Houdini's grave at Machpelah Cemetery to hold memorial services for the famed escape artist.

Although born Erich Weiss, he changed his name to Harry Houdini at the age of 17. He chose this name because admired the French magician Robert Houdin. There were rumors concerning that there was a secret compartment at Houdini's grave in Queens. In addition, some people believe this cemetery, near Houdini grave, holds a secret compartment: this compartment, revealed by a hidden device, was said to be where dark secrets are waiting to be discovered. Magic historian and Houdini biographer Milbourne Christopher, during an interview, said he did not believe that such a compartment existed and that Houdini would never communicate from beyond the grave; then he said that it might be possible.

The Machpelah Cemetery was visited by many figures. David Copperfield, perhaps the world's best-known contemporary magician, paid his respects at Harry Houdini's grave site. Furthermore, Copperfield donated $15,000 to the Society of American Magicians in order to help undo an act of vandalism which desecrated several graves, along with Houdini's, after speaking with the Society of American Magician's Chairman John Bohannon. Along with Copperfield's donation, the escape artist James Randi donated $2,000, and $8,000 were donated from magicians all over the world; these donations paid for the replacement of two granite benches that were vandalized in 1993 and for casting a permanent Houdini bust.

George Schindler, the dean of the Society of American Magicians, said his group had stopped contributing money toward the maintenance of the site in recent years. "[Cemetery administrator] David Jacobson sends us a bill for upkeep every year but we never pay it." "The Society of American Magicians never paid the cemetery for any restoration of the Houdini family plot in my tenure since 1988," Jacobson said. The money came from the dwindling funds of the Machpelah Cemetery, he said.

The Society of American Magicians performed a "broken wand" ritual on October 31, 1996, the anniversary of Houdini's death. This ritual in which a "magic wand" is broken symbolizes the end of the magician's power.

The granite monuments of Houdini's sister, Gladys, and brother, Leopold, are missing. Some members of the society say they believe that Jacobson has hidden them, or worse, sold them off to collectors. "I have them," Jacobson has said. "They are broken." The Houdini grave site is no longer cared for by the Society of American Magicians, but by The Houdini Museum in Scranton, Pennsylvania.

A bust of Harry Houdini was smashed or stolen four times from his family plot at Machpelah between 1975 and 1993. The Society of American Magicians gave up trying to replace it. Houdini was president of this society at the time of his death in 1926. On September 27, 2011, a group from the Harry Houdini Museum in Scranton secretly installed a reproduction of the bust, made from durable statuary cement. Among the group were Dorothy Dietrich and Dick Brookz, museum directors, and retired escape artist Stephen Moore. The officials of the cemetery and The Society, despite the unorthodox approach, stated they were pleased with the result. "When someone offers to repair something that's broken — in a charitable spirit — any cemetery would be thrilled," Jacobson, the cemetery director, said.
