= West Farms Soldiers Cemetery =

Cemetery in the Bronx, New York City

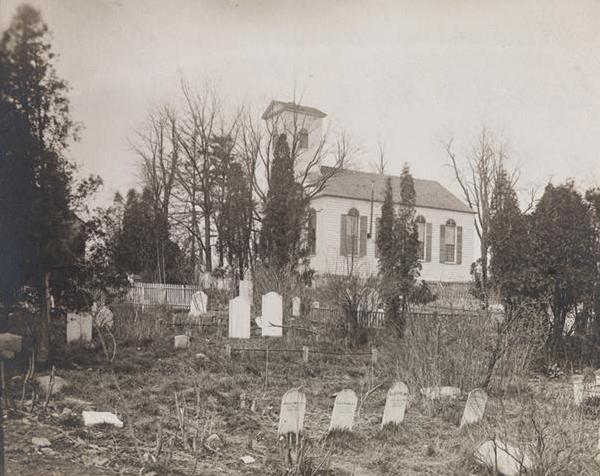
- West Farms Presbyterian Church, looking uphill from the graveyard. Circa 1885.
- Interactive map of West Farms Soldiers Cemetery

Details
- Established: 1827
- Abandoned: 1927 or earlier
- Location: West Farms, The Bronx, New York City
- Country: United States
- Coordinates: 40°50′37″N 73°52′45″W
- Type: Military
- Owned by: City of New York
- Size: 0.68 acres (0.28 ha)
- No. of graves: approximately 40
- Website: www.nycgovparks.org/parks/west-farms-soldiers-cemetery
- Find a Grave: West Farms Soldiers Cemetery

The West Farms Soldiers Cemetery is located at 2103 Bryant Avenue and 180th Street in the West Farms section of the Bronx in New York City. It is the oldest public veterans' burial ground in the Bronx. The cemetery contains the remains of 40 US veterans including 2 from the War of 1812, 35 from the Civil War, 2 from the Spanish-American War, and 2 from the First World War. The cemetery is a New York City landmark, designated by the Landmarks Preservation Commission on August 2, 1967.

== History of the church and cemetery ==
The earliest known cemetery in the vicinity was the Lawrence Family Burial Ground, located on the south side of Samuel Street (now 180th Street). The Lawrence family maintained a farm in the area.

In 1814 The First Presbyterian Church of West Farms (also known as the West Farms Presbyterian Church) was formed. The Lawrence family donated a 295 ft × 100 ft (90 m × 30 m) lot (which included the burial ground) to the new church, retaining burial rights for the Lawrence family. At the same time, the church acquired an 80-by-175-foot (24 m × 53 m) parcel opposite the Lawrence property on the north side of Samuel Street. A church with a surrounding graveyard was built atop a hill on the north parcel the next year.

In 1827 John Butler, a farmer, purchased a 100-by-200-foot (30 m × 61 m) parcel directly to the east of the northern churchyard, to be used for private burials. Butler's property, originally known as the Butler Cemetery became the West Farms Cemetery, later renamed the West Farms Soldiers Cemetery. Butler sold the property to his son, John Butler Jr. in 1872.

John Jr sold the cemetery to undertaker Alfred Pettit in 1873. In 1882, Pettit sold the land to another undertaker, Isaac Butler (not related to the original owners) who owned it until his death in 1913, after which the property was inherited by his son, William. When William died in 1925, the undertaking business was inherited by his sons Frank and Roy. Ownership of the cemetery itself passed to Frank, Roy, and their sister, Florence Crooker.

== Abandonment ==
By 1907, the property had been abandoned. The Bronx Committee of the One Hundred passed a resolution that the Old West Farms Presbyterian Cemetery should be turned into a public park. Doing so would help protect the graves of the soldiers who had been buried there, many of which were now unmarked and desecrated. In the December 31, 1908 quarterly report, the Bronx president's office reported having spent $25 (equivalent to $630 in 2025) to erect a fence around the cemetery.

The New York Evening Telegram reported in 1908 that the cemetery, “abandoned and almost forgotten”, contained the graves of a dozen or more civil war soldiers. These graves were reported to be covered by “thick brambles and the accumulated litter of the city’s streets”. The paper noted the “almost indescribable conditions of neglect and desecration into which [the graves] have fallen”. One grave, that of William J. Raspberry, was reported to be spoiled by “rusty tin cans, bottles, and worse”.

By 1927, vegetation was growing over the cannons and the Civil War monument. Community groups such as the Boy Scouts and the Veterans of Foreign Wars undertook periodic cleanup efforts.

In 1988, it was reported that adherents of Santeria and other traditional religions with African or Caribbean roots were conducting animal sacrifices in the vicinity and dumping the headless bodies of the animals over the fence into the cemetery. Frank Mastrandrea, director of field operations for the Unit of Inactive Cemeteries at the New York City Department of General Services said the animals included chickens, dogs, and cats, and would sometimes be found in cardboard boxes or plastic bags.

== New York City ownership ==
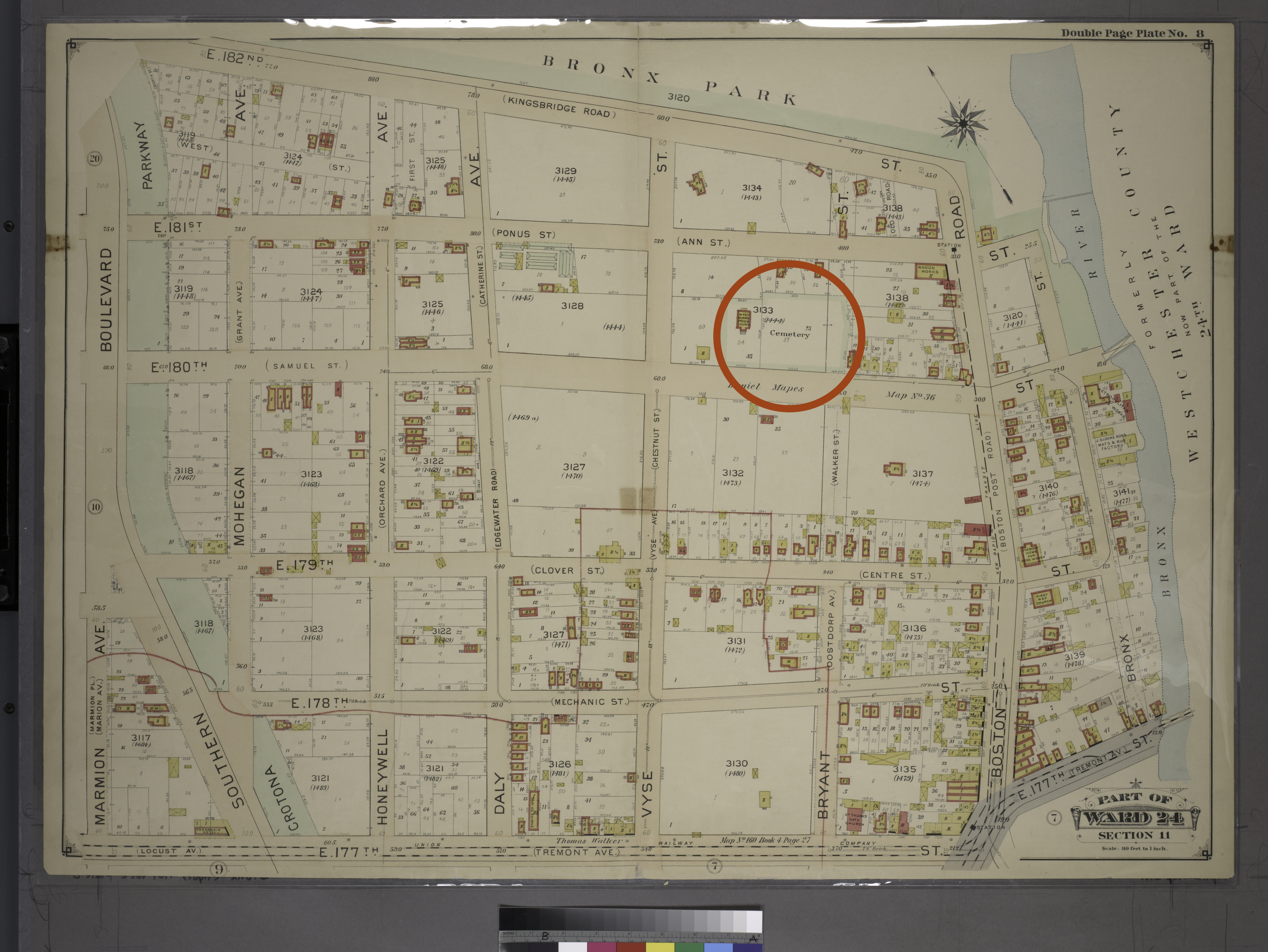
1901 map with location of cemetery indicated by red circle. Map is oriented with north-east at the top.

The portion of the property which was not owned by the West Farms Presbyterian Church was transferred to New York City in 1954 after a period of time when the ownership of the property was uncertain. The ownership question was cleared by a year-long research project undertaken by Tony Marotta, a Bronx resident and past commander of Frank H. Corbett Post 1144 of the American Legion.

Corbett's research through municipal records found a letter by Henry Bruckner, Bronx borough president from 1918 to 1933, which referenced a deed which had conveyed the property to the city. A 1935 letter from the New York City controller's office to the city corporation counsel's office asked about the legality of the deed. A reply in 1936 stated that since the Board of Estimate had not officially accepted the deed, the city did not own the property. A further search located the heirs of previous owners; Florence T. Crooker, Franks R. Butler, and Roy E. Butler, who were all still living in the area. At the urging of Marotta and several other representatives of the American Legion, the heirs agreed to transfer the property to the city in 1954.

As of 2022, the property is under the control of the Parks Department.

== Beck Memorial Presbyterian Church ==
After the church bought the Lawrence property on the south side of Samuel Street, it was used as "a graveyard for strangers and black slaves". In 1905, the church built a new building on this lot, converting the original building on the north property into a gymnasium and recreation hall. This building was lost to fire in 1948. The new building on the south side of the street became known as the Beck Memorial Presbyterian Church. Charles Bathgate Beck had left $100,000 (equivalent to $180,000,000 in 2025) in his will to fund the construction as a memorial to his mother, Janet B. Beck. In 1908, the Presbyterian Historical Society wrote:

Some have questioned the economic wisdom of building this particular type of church in West Farms, where there is a rapidly growing population, largely of the class for which institutional effort is effective. Be that as it may, the new West Farms church stands as a fine example of the family church, and it has also facilities for much aggressive work in its neighborhood

— William T. Demarest, A Great Year of Presbyterian Church Building in New York City, Journal of the Presbyterian Historical Society

== Interments ==
In 1815, Samuel Adams, a veteran of the War of 1812 from a landowning family in the area, was the first person buried in the cemetery. Burials continued until after World War I when Pvt. Valerie Tulosa was buried.

On May 28, 1916, the remains of six unclaimed bodies which had previously been buried on Hart Island (Bronx) were reinterred at West Farms. At the time, there were an additional twenty-five civil war veterans buried on Hart Island which were intended to be reinterred when funds could be raised.

== Monuments ==
In 1909, a cemetery committee erected a monument consisting of a bronze statue of a Union Army soldier on a pedestal. Three nineteenth-century field pieces were also placed on the grounds at the same time. The statue suffered from the weather and vandalism and was removed around 1950. It was in an unknown location for the next several years. It was repaired and restored to the monument on November 18, 1959. A Civil War Memorial Committee made additional improvements. The statue was located in a New York City Department of Public works warehouse by Bert Sack, an aficionado of Civil War history and a World War I veteran; Sack had it moved to the shop of Andrew Betz, a coppersmith in nearby Yonkers where it underwent repairs.

On October 16, 1977, a memorial plaque was installed honoring Mary Bowser, a black woman from the American south who worked as a spy for the Union army during the Civil War. Bowser, pretending to be illiterate, worked as a domestic servant for Confederate President Jefferson Davis. Her duties gave her access to military reports, which she memorized and passed the information on to Elizabeth Van Lew, who in turn sent it to Union General Ulysses S. Grant. The dedication ceremony included a 21-gun salute from the National Guard.

== Gallery ==
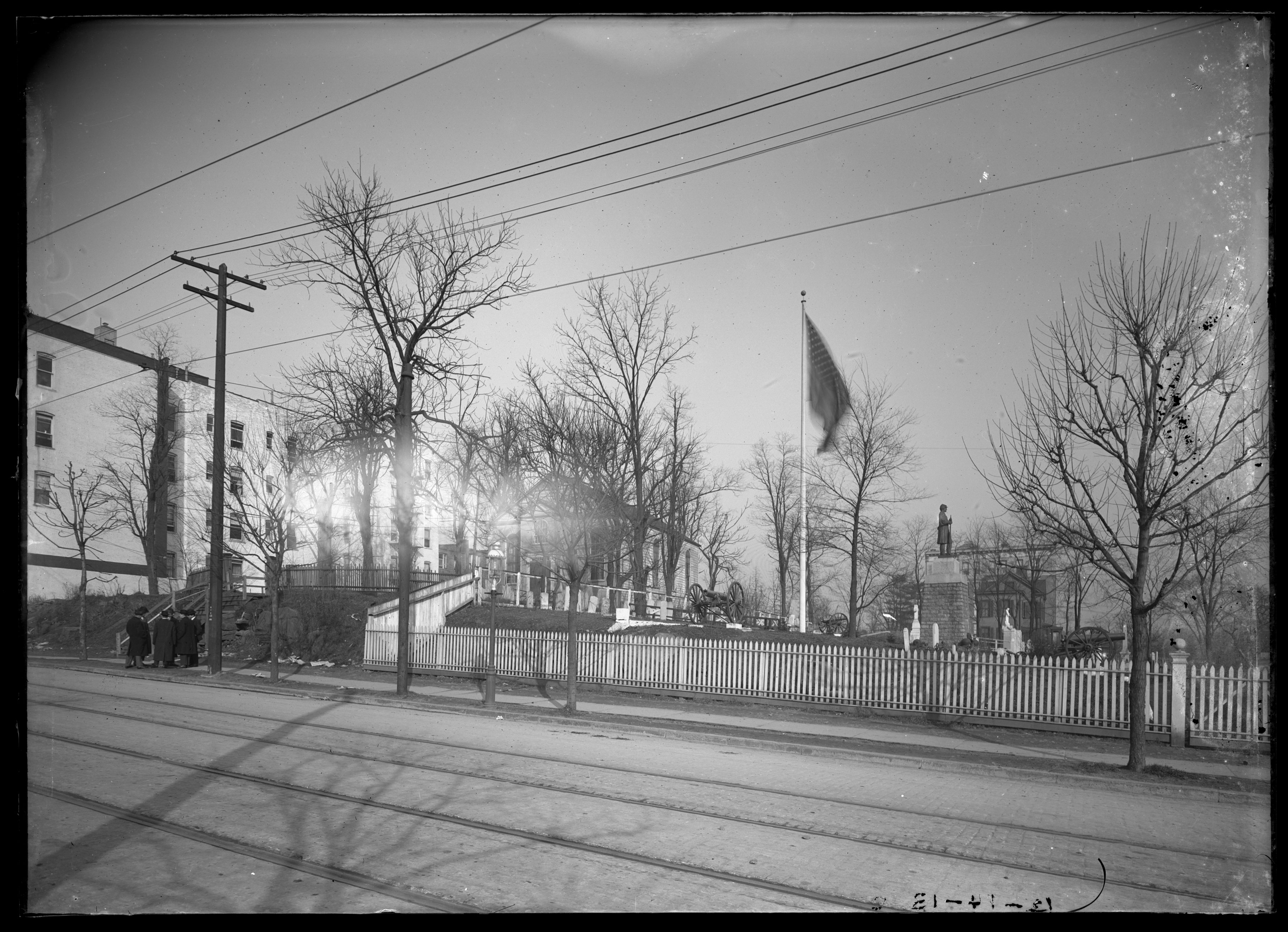
View from street

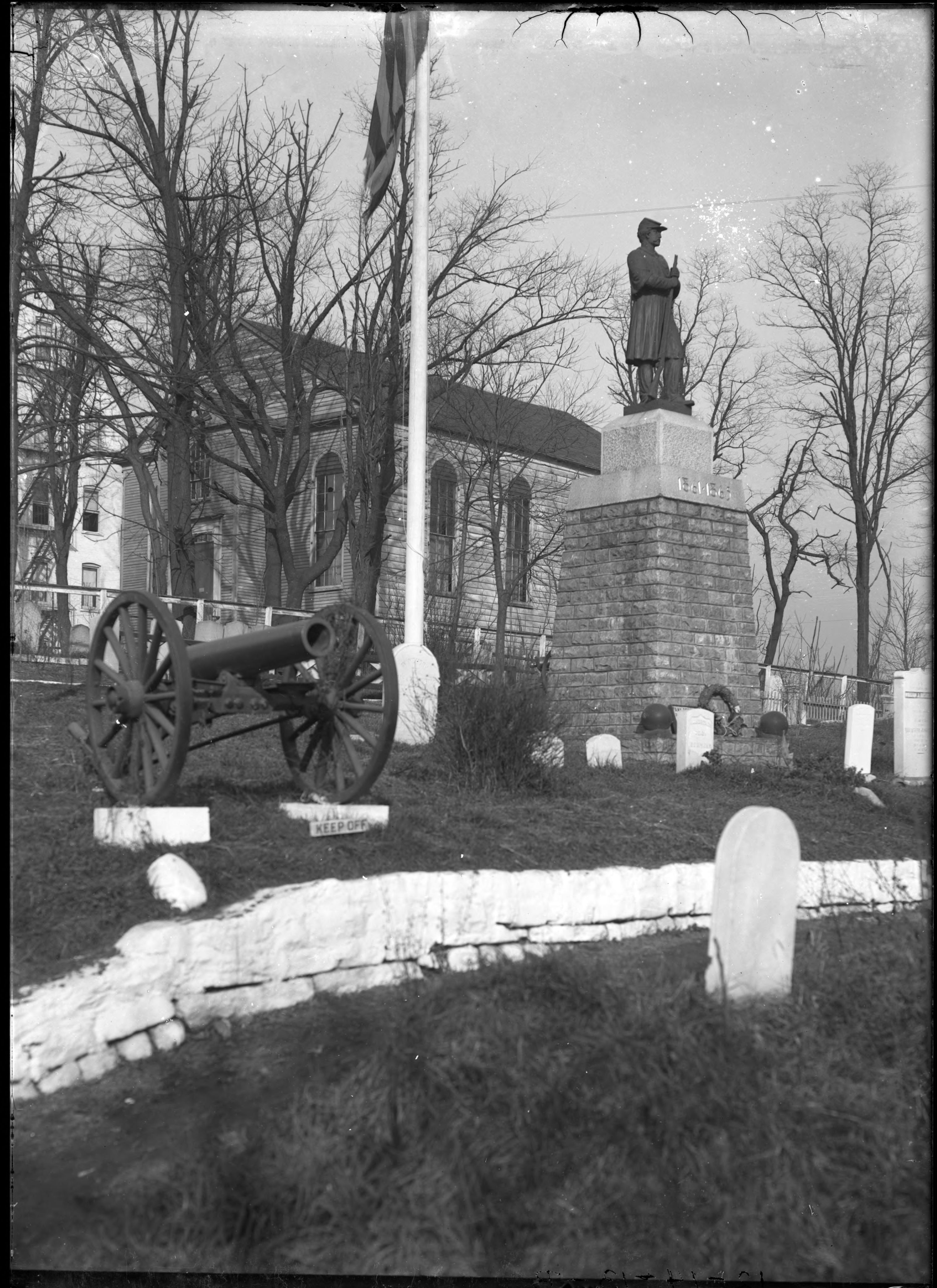
View looking up the hill towards the 1814 church building

1907 church building.
