= Peter Houseman House =

Historic house in Staten Island, New York

- U.S. National Register of Historic Places
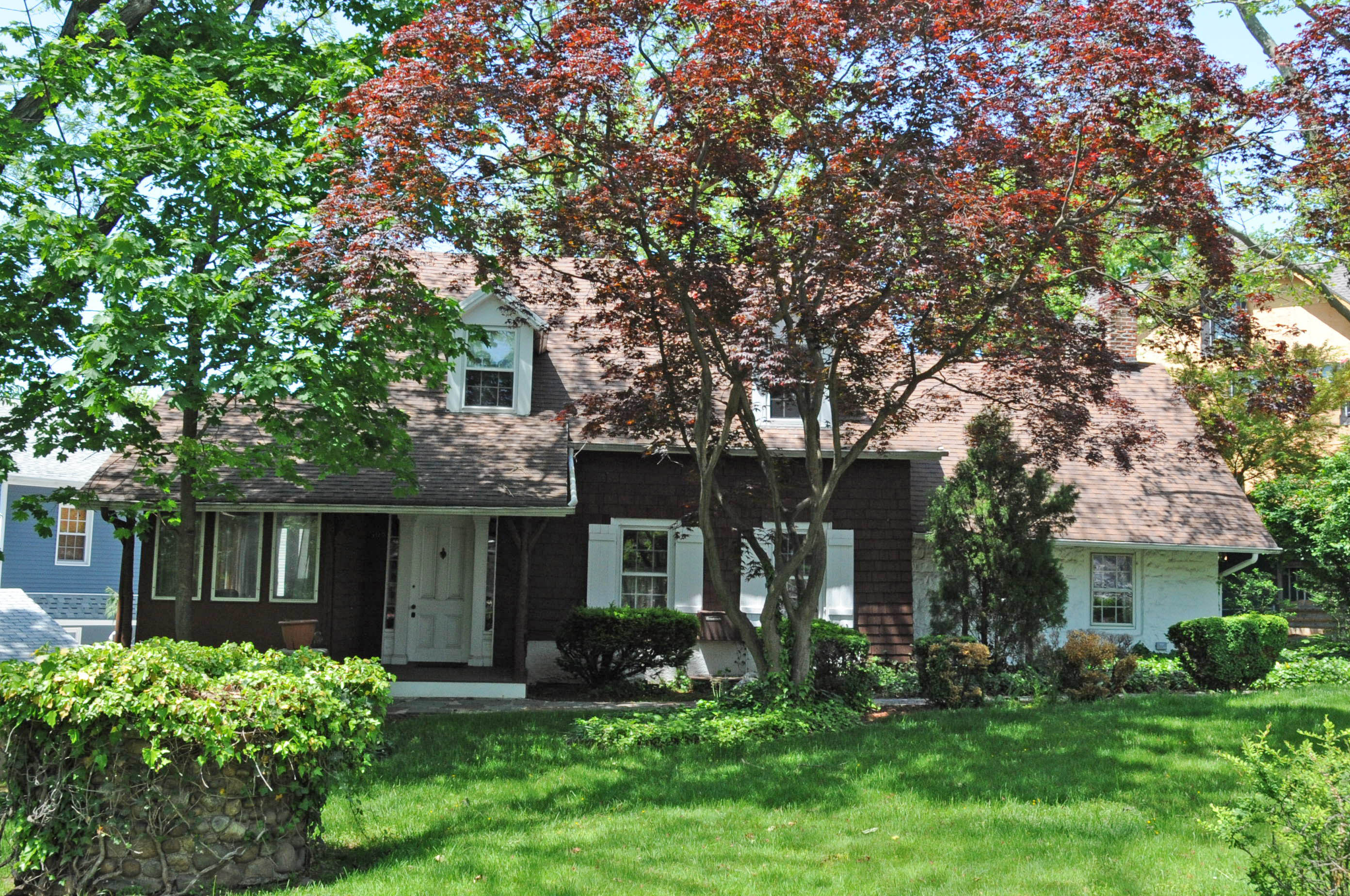

- Location within New York City Location within New York Location within the United States
- Location: 308 St. John Ave., Staten Island, New York
- Coordinates: 40°36′57″N 74°8′12″W
- Area: less than one acre
- Built: 1730
- Architectural style: Colonial
- NRHP reference No.: 82001261
- Added to NRHP: October 29, 1982

Peter Houseman House is a historic home located at Westerleigh, Staten Island, New York. It consists of two sections, one built about 1730 and the second about 1760. The older section is a 1 1/2-story, stone wing built of fieldstone painted white. The newer section is a 1 1/2-story, large frame section with a gable roof.

It was added to the National Register of Historic Places in 1982.
