= Moore-Jackson Cemetery =

Historic cemetery in Queens, New York

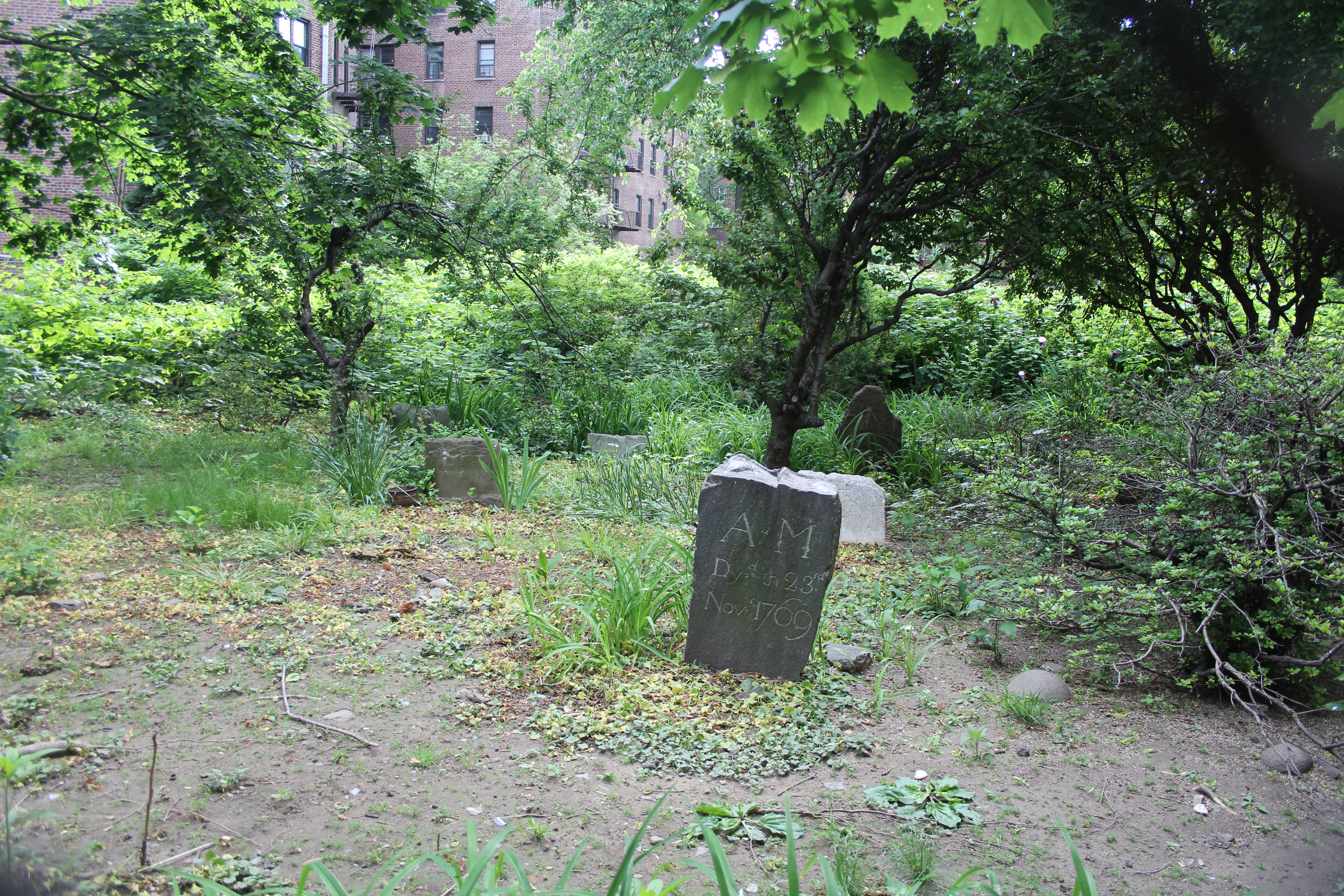
- The cemetery in 2014
- Interactive map of Moore-Jackson Cemetery

Details
- Established: 1733–1868
- Location: Queens, New York, US
- Coordinates: 40°45′22″N 73°54′28″W
- Size: 104.5 ft × 223.3 ft (32 m × 68 m)
- No. of interments: approximately 48

New York City Landmark
- Designated: March 18, 1997
- Reference no.: 1956

The Moore-Jackson Cemetery is a historic cemetery in the Woodside neighborhood of Queens in New York City, United States. Active from 1733 to about 1868, it is one of New York City's few remaining 18th-century cemeteries and is a New York City designated landmark. The burial ground occupies a five-sided site on 51st and 54th Streets between 31st and 32nd Avenues. While the cemetery spans about 20,000 square feet (1,900 m^{2}), all of the surviving tombstones are placed along 54th Street. The cemetery was part of the estate of Samuel and Charity Moore, members of one of Queens's oldest families, and contains approximately 48 corpses.

The Moores bought the land in 1684 and owned it for over a century. Many of the cemetery's interments are family members of John, Nathaniel, and Mary Moore, three of the Moores' ten children. The tombstone of Augustine Moore (d. 1769) is the oldest that still retains an inscription, as many of the 18th-century tombstones have degraded to the point of illegibility. Though the family estate was sold several times after 1827, interments continued until 1869. John C. Jackson, a member of the Moore family, bought additional land near the cemetery in 1867.

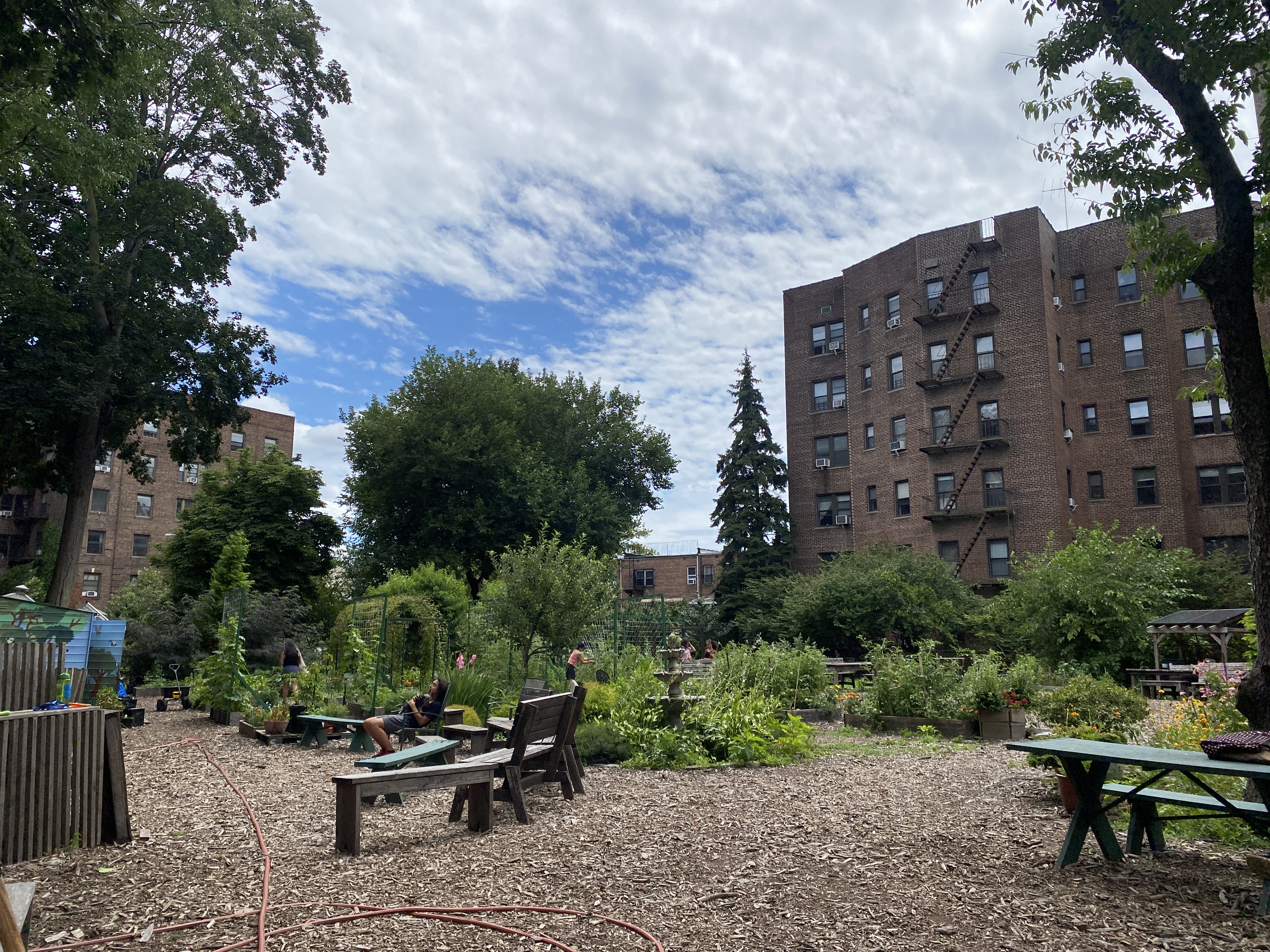
Moore Jackson Community Garden in 2025

The Moore/Jackson family continued to care for the site until about 1910, after which the cemetery fell into severe disrepair. A survey in 1919 found 42 gravestones. After the cemetery underwent a period of disrepair, Works Progress Administration workers relocated the remaining tombstones in 1935 and raised the land. The New York City government seized the cemetery in 1954, and a fence was erected around it two years later. The cemetery deteriorated yet again through the late 20th century, though local resident Cecile Pontecorvo maintained it starting in 1974. The New York City Landmarks Preservation Commission designated the graveyard as a landmark in 1997 following an unsuccessful attempt in the 1970s. The Queens Historical Society bought the Moore-Jackson Cemetery from the Moores' last remaining descendant in 1999 and subsequently restored it. A community garden was established in the cemetery in 2018.

== Site ==
The Moore-Jackson Cemetery is in the Woodside neighborhood of Queens in New York City. The cemetery is bounded by 51st Street to the west and 54th Street to the east, in the middle of the block between 31st Avenue to the north and 32nd Avenue to the south. The site is perpendicular to 51st Street, which runs diagonally to the other three streets; it was originally rectangular. When 54th Street was constructed, the northeast corner was trimmed by a chamfer. The cemetery has a frontage of 104.5 feet (32 m) to the west, 194.8 feet (59 m) to the north, 73.3 feet (22 m) to the northeast, 37.3 feet (11 m) to the east, and 223.3 feet (68 m) to the south. The cemetery is surrounded by a fence. Across 51st Street are the Woodside Houses.

The cemetery is geographically on the northern shore of Long Island in a lowland area north of the Harbor Hill Moraine. Prior to the development of the surrounding area, a river ran along Northern Boulevard, south of the cemetery's site. The area to the east was a marshland known as Trains Meadow, which existed until the 1920s. The site is near Bowery Bay; as a result, 31st Avenue had historically been known as Bowery Bay Road.

== Estate and burials ==
The cemetery is the burial plot of the Moore family, one of Queens's oldest families; its descendants included writer Clement Clarke Moore. The family is descended from John Moore, the first minister of the First Presbyterian Church of Newtown; he was one of the earliest settlers of Newtown, now Elmhurst, after the town was established in 1642. After John Moore's death in 1657, Newtown officials had granted land to his son, captain Samuel Moore (died 1817), who bought land around Bowery Bay in 1684 for a family estate, including a house on Bowery Bay Road. The estate was divided in 1701 between the captain's sons Joseph (1679–1756), who took the northern half, and Samuel (died 1858), who took the southern half. The younger Samuel Moore married Charity Hallett in 1705, and they had ten children. Many of the cemetery's interments are related to three of Samuel and Charity's children: John, Nathaniel, and Mary.

=== 18th and early 19th centuries ===
The first recorded burial on the Moore family's land had a tombstone dated May 29, 1733. The initials and death date did not correspond to any known immediate family member. Since Long Island was largely formed from glacial outwash, the stone from the surrounding area was unusable, and there were no professional tombstone makers in Queens until 1800. As a result, many of the cemetery's 18th-century tombstones were made from fieldstone or wood and have degraded to the point of illegibility. Charity (d. 1753) and Samuel (d. 1768) were also interred, though their tombstones are no longer legible. The earliest legible tombstone is that of Augustine Moore (d. 1769), the 17-year-old son of John Moore and his wife Patience. Nathaniel Moore bought about 100 acres (40 ha) of land on the estate from his father in 1756. Nathaniel, a Loyalist during the American Revolutionary War, used the family estate to shelter British troops. Though most Loyalists had their land seized after the Revolutionary War, the Moores were not among them.

Nathaniel's only son Nathaniel Moore Jr. took over the family estate in 1802 after his father's death. John (d. 1806) and Patience (d. 1781) were both buried in the cemetery, as were their other sons David (d. 1823) and Samuel (d. 1813). Nathaniel, his wife Rebecca Blackwell Moore (d. 1790), and their daughter Mary Berrian (d. 1788) were also interred in the cemetery. The younger Nathaniel continued to live on the estate until his own death in 1827. In his will, Nathaniel Jr. had stipulated that, in case the Moore homestead was sold, the 0.25-acre (0.10 ha) cemetery would remain in the family's ownership. Though Nathaniel Jr. and his wife Martha Gedney Moore were also interred in the Moore Cemetery upon their deaths, a descendant later relocated their corpses to the St. James Church graveyard. Martha's sister Deborah Gedney Rapelye, Deborah's husband Bernard Rapelye, and their children were all buried in the cemetery as well.

=== Mid- and late 19th century ===
Nathaniel Jr.'s son-in-law Robert Blackwell acquired the estate but died in 1828. Afterward, the estate passed between multiple owners. Jacob Bindernagel bought the property from Blackwell's executors and sold it to Samuel B. Townsend in 1832. Townsend lived on the farm with his wife until he sold it to Charles Kneeland in the mid-1850s. Kneeland sold a section of the farm in 1859 to the Hunters Point Newtown & Flushing Turnpike Company, which built what is now Northern Boulevard. The remainder of the farm was acquired by John A. Mecke in 1863. Mecke had planned to divide the site for development, but he died in 1867, having gone into bankruptcy. The receiver, George Mosle, sold the farm in September 1867 to carpenters Emil Cuntz and Henry G. Schmidt. Though Cuntz and Schmidt laid out the surrounding lots in a grid by 1871, the surrounding area remained undeveloped through the 20th century; the Moore farmhouse was destroyed in 1901.

John C. Jackson, the husband of one of Nathaniel Moore's granddaughters, bought a plot to the north of the cemetery in June 1867. The move reasserted the family's ownership over the site when Mecke had gone into bankruptcy. Afterward, the cemetery became known as the Moore-Jackson Cemetery. The last interment was in 1868, (Note: One source cited the last interment as being in 1867.) when a member of the Dustan family (into which Nathaniel Moore Jr.'s daughter had married) was buried there. At its peak, the cemetery was recorded as having 46 tombstones with inscriptions, though Queens's borough historian Stanley Cogan cited the cemetery as having 48 tombstones. According to the New York City Landmarks Preservation Commission (LPC), there were 51 tombstones made of fieldstone, brownstone, and marble.

== Later history ==
=== Deterioration ===
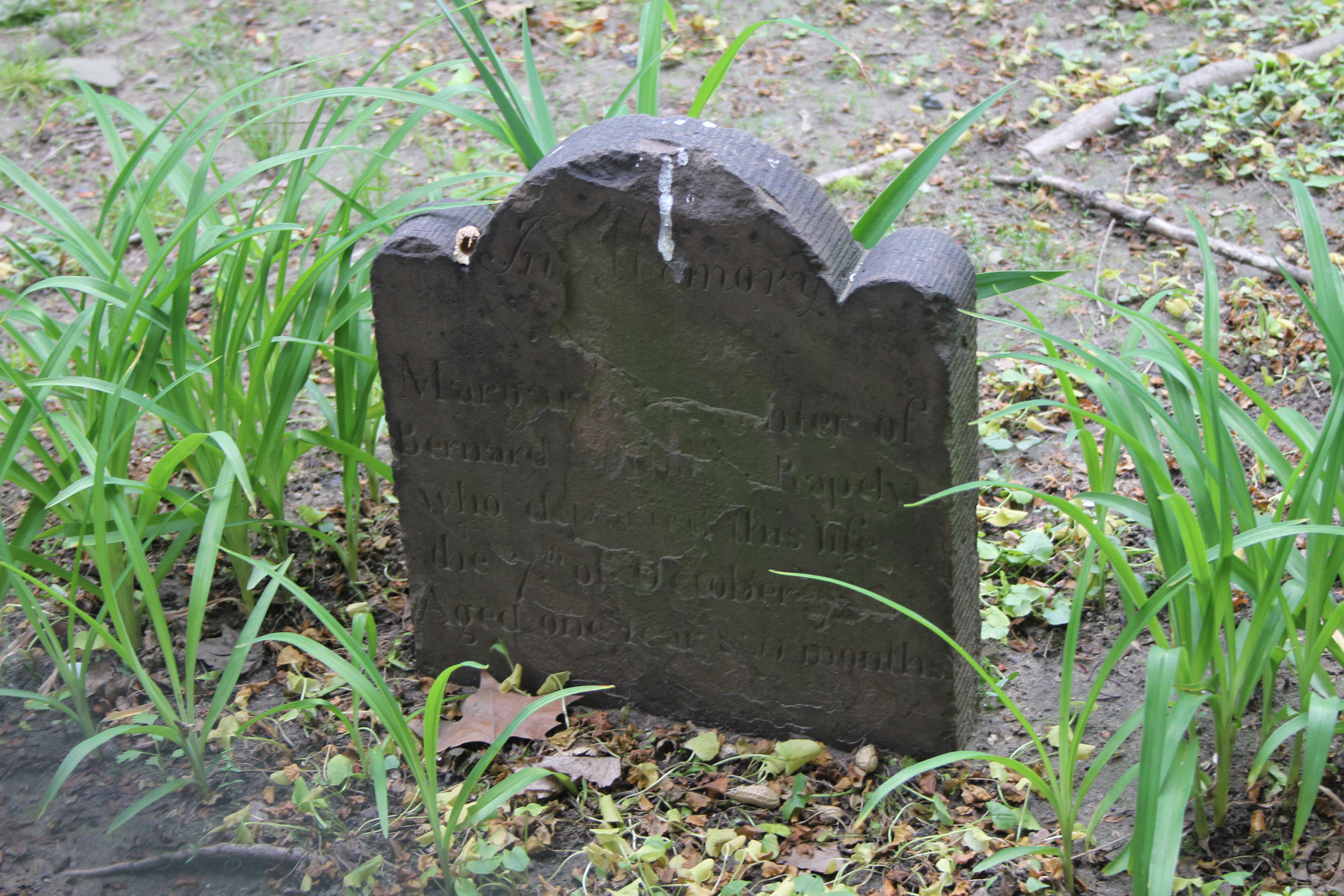
Tombstone in Moore-Jackson Cemetery

The cemetery continued to be maintained by the Moore-Jackson family until about 1910. Jackson's only child, Mary Ann Riker, lived in a nearby mansion until her death in 1909, after which Riker's daughter Margaret Haskell disassembled the old Riker mansion and rebuilt it in New Jersey. The borough president of Queens was planning a street grid for the borough by the late 1910s. Engineer-in-charge Charles U. Powell surveyed the borough's remaining small cemeteries, of which only about two dozen remained. (Note: Sources cite either 22 or 23 remaining cemeteries.) The Moore-Jackson Cemetery was one of the first cemeteries examined, in July 1919, when Powell's survey identified 42 tombstones. The cemetery was further documented in photographs by Eugene Armbruster in 1925 and the Topographical Bureau in 1927.

The Moore-Jackson Cemetery was then neglected and treated as a dump, as noted in a 1931 New York Times article. It was not until 1935 that Works Progress Administration workers, hired to clear weeds from the site, rediscovered the cemetery. The next year, the burial plot was restored and the surviving tombstones were rearranged. All of the remaining tombstones were placed on a section of the cemetery, measuring 40 by 50 feet (12 by 15 m), near the eastern part of the site. The corpses were not moved, which resulted in some of the corpses being unmarked and some tombstones being placed atop nothing. The land was raised to the height of the surrounding streets and a concrete-post fence was erected around the plot.

In 1954, a developer tried to acquire the Moore-Jackson Cemetery on the basis that it had not paid taxes, but he stopped his efforts after learning that cemeteries were tax-exempt by law. The city government had already seized the land for nonpayment of taxes, an action that city officials were unable to explain. The officials found there would not be enough money to even build a fence unless special legislation were passed. By then, children were described as "playing among high weeds" and 16 remaining tombstones. This prompted a "patriotic organization" to install a chain-link fence around the cemetery in 1956, measuring 10 feet (3.0 m) tall. There was an effort to restore the graveyard in 1963, but the burial ground still remained derelict in the late 1960s. Neighbors continued to care for the cemetery, which by the 1970s only had four or five remaining tombstones. Meanwhile, neighbors also advocated for the LPC to protect the cemetery as a city landmark in 1974. However, the city could not identify the holder of the cemetery's title, and the owner had to be identified before a landmark status could be granted.

=== Preservation ===
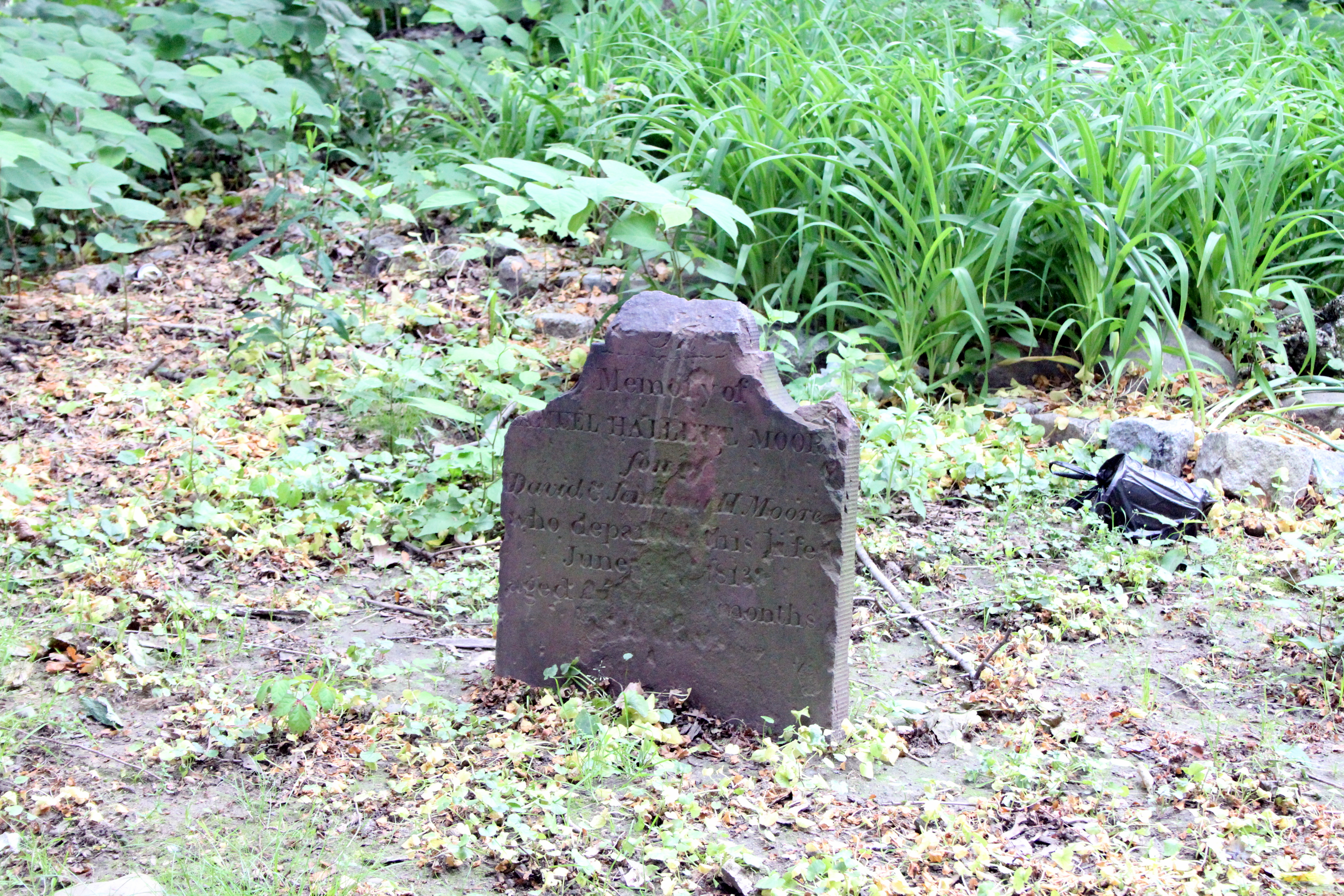
Another tombstone in Moore-Jackson Cemetery

During the last quarter of the 20th century, local resident Cecile Pontecorvo maintained the cemetery, removing garbage and placing plantings. Pontecorvo, who had first seen the cemetery from her house in 1974, generally cleaned the plot two to three times a week. In the 1990s, the eastern half of the cemetery was restored. A volunteer placed a T-shaped brick-and-stone walkway on the eastern part of the site, but he ran out of materials after 10 feet (3.0 m). The LPC considered the cemetery for landmark status in January 1997, following two years of advocacy from Woodside residents. New York City Council member Walter McCaffrey and U.S. Representative Thomas J. Manton both supported landmark designation, as did local residents. Initially, the commission could not vote on the landmark designation because of unclear ownership; only one descendant could be identified. On March 22, 1997, the LPC designated the cemetery as a city landmark, making it the sixth small cemetery in Queens to be designated as such.

Despite the landmark designation, the sidewalk outside the cemetery remained in disrepair, and no landmark plaque was installed for over a year. Nonetheless, the cemetery was in better shape than other designated landmarks in Queens such as St. Monica's Church, the RKO Keith's Theater, or the New York Architectural Terra-Cotta Company Building. The sidewalk along 54th Street was constructed outside the cemetery's fence in September 1998. The Queens Historical Society bought the cemetery from the Moores' last remaining descendant for $1 in 1999. By then, the cemetery only had 15 remaining tombstones. The western part was overgrown and was used at a dumping ground, blocked off by a bamboo fence. Local elementary school students helped restore the cemetery in 2000, during which the Queens Historical Society found three tombstones. and New York City Council member Margaret Markey secured a $3,000 grant for the cemetery's restoration in 2002.

The cemetery again fell into disrepair, and local residents started a campaign to restore the cemetery in October 2017. The cemetery was restored from 2018 to 2022 and a community garden was placed in the space. The community garden spans 20,000 square feet (1,900 m^{2}). Its entrance is on 51st Street while the cemetery's remaining tombstones are on 54th Street.

== See also ==
- List of cemeteries in New York City
- List of New York City Designated Landmarks in Queens
