= Michael Furst =

Jewish-American lawyer

- Born: July 15, 1856; Brooklyn, New York, U.S.
- Died: June 27, 1934 (aged 77); Brooklyn, New York, U.S.
- Resting place: Union Field Cemetery
- Education: Brooklyn Polytechnic Institute; Yale College (BA); Columbia Law School (LLB)
- Occupation: Lawyer
- Employer(s): Furst & Furst; Furst, Schwartz & Schwager
- Known for: Real estate law, civic reform in New York City
- Parent(s): Solomon Furst; Bertha Jaffe

Michael Furst (July 15, 1856 – June 27, 1934) was a Jewish-American lawyer from Brooklyn, New York.

== Life ==
Furst was born on July 15, 1856, in Brooklyn, New York, the son of Solomon Furst and Bertha Jaffe. His parents were German Jews who immigrated to America in 1851 from Rawicz, Prussia. His father was a merchant tailor on Atlantic Avenue, a veteran of the New York State Militia who helped quell the 1863 New York City draft riots, and president of Congregation Baith Israel.

Furst attended P.S. No. 6 and the Brooklyn Polytechnic Institute. After graduating from there, he went to Yale College, making him the first Brooklyn Jew to attend college. The only Jew in his class, he spoke at the graduation exercise on "The Modern Jew." He was a member of Kappa Sigma Epsilon at Yale. He graduated from there with a B.A. in 1876. He began attending Columbia Law School that year, graduating with an LL.B. in 1878. He also read law in the office of Philip S. Crooke and N. H. Clement. He was admitted to the bar in 1878, after which he began practicing law in Brooklyn. He was at one point examining counsel of the Lawyers' Title Insurance Company, as which he certified tracts and farms in old New Utrecht. He also helped develop the Van Pelt Manor suburb.

Furst worked in Crooke's law office until 1881. He then practiced law independently until 1907, after which he and his nephew Arnold Furst were part of the law firm Furst & Furst. In 1918, he became the senior member of the firm Furst, Schwartz & Schwager. In 1894, Corporation Counsel Albert G. McDonald appointed him assistant counsel and put him in charge of a new real estate bureau. He was reappointed to that position by Corporation Counsel Joseph A. Burr in 1896. He served in that position until the consolidation of New York City in 1898.

Furst was considered an authority on real estate matters, especially appraisals. In February 1910, Mayor William Jay Gaynor appointed him Aqueduct Commissioner, an old commission of nominal importance Gaynor sought to eliminate. The commission ended its own existence in June 1910, transferring its powers to the New York City Department of Water Supply. He was a commissioner in the condemnation proceedings to widen Livingston Street, serving on the commission with J. Edward Swanstrom and Luke D. Stapleton. The commission saved the city two million dollars. During World War I, he was chairman of the Local Board No. 49.

Furst was involved with a number of civic reforms under Mayor Gaynor, a close friend of his. He served on a commission that drafted an ordinance to regulate motion picture theaters. He was also involved in taxicab rate regulations, pushcart peddler rules, theater ticket speculation, and licenses for all-night hotels and restaurants. He was a member of the Tricentenary Commission and chairman of a commission to codify laws governing the Municipal Court. The latter commission prepared a code that went into effect in 1915. He was also an executive committee member of the Brooklyn committee on city plans, an Advisory Commission member on city planning in New York City, and a member of the Board of Child Welfare. Mayor John Purroy Mitchell appointed him to the latter board.

Furst died at home from pneumonia on June 27, 1934. He never married. His funeral at Union Temple was conducted by the temple's rabbi Sidney Tedesche and rabbi emeritus Simon R. Cohen. His funeral was attended by distinguished legal figures and other notable Brooklynites. He was buried in Union Field Cemetery.
