= Cherry Lane Cemetery =

Cemetery in New York City (c. 1850–1954)

- Interactive map of Cherry Lane Cemetery

Details
- Established: c. 1850
- Closed: 1954
- Location: Westerleigh, Staten Island, New York City, US
- Country: United States
- Coordinates: 40.6243°N 74.1366°W
- Type: African-American church burial ground (obliterated)
- Owned by: Second Asbury African Methodist Episcopal Zion Church (historical)

Cherry Lane Cemetery was a 19th-century burial ground located in the Westerleigh section of Staten Island, New York, United States. Established by members of the Second Asbury African Methodist Episcopal Zion Church, the cemetery was the final burial place of free and formerly enslaved black Staten Islanders until the 1950s, when the land was redeveloped into a Shell station, and then in the 1980s as a shopping plaza.

Although the cemetery was never formally registered under the name "Cherry Lane", that designation has been adopted in modern historical and media accounts. In the 2020s, the site became the focus of descendant-led preservation efforts and scholarly research. It was co-named "Benjamin Prine Way" in 2023 after the most renowned of the interred, and a memorial garden was dedicated to the former burial ground in 2024.

== History ==
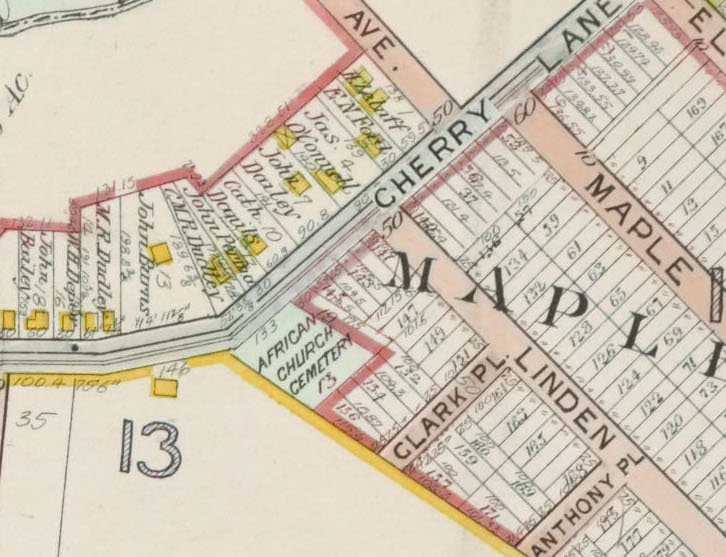
1907 E. Robinson Atlas showing the site labeled "African Church Cemetery"

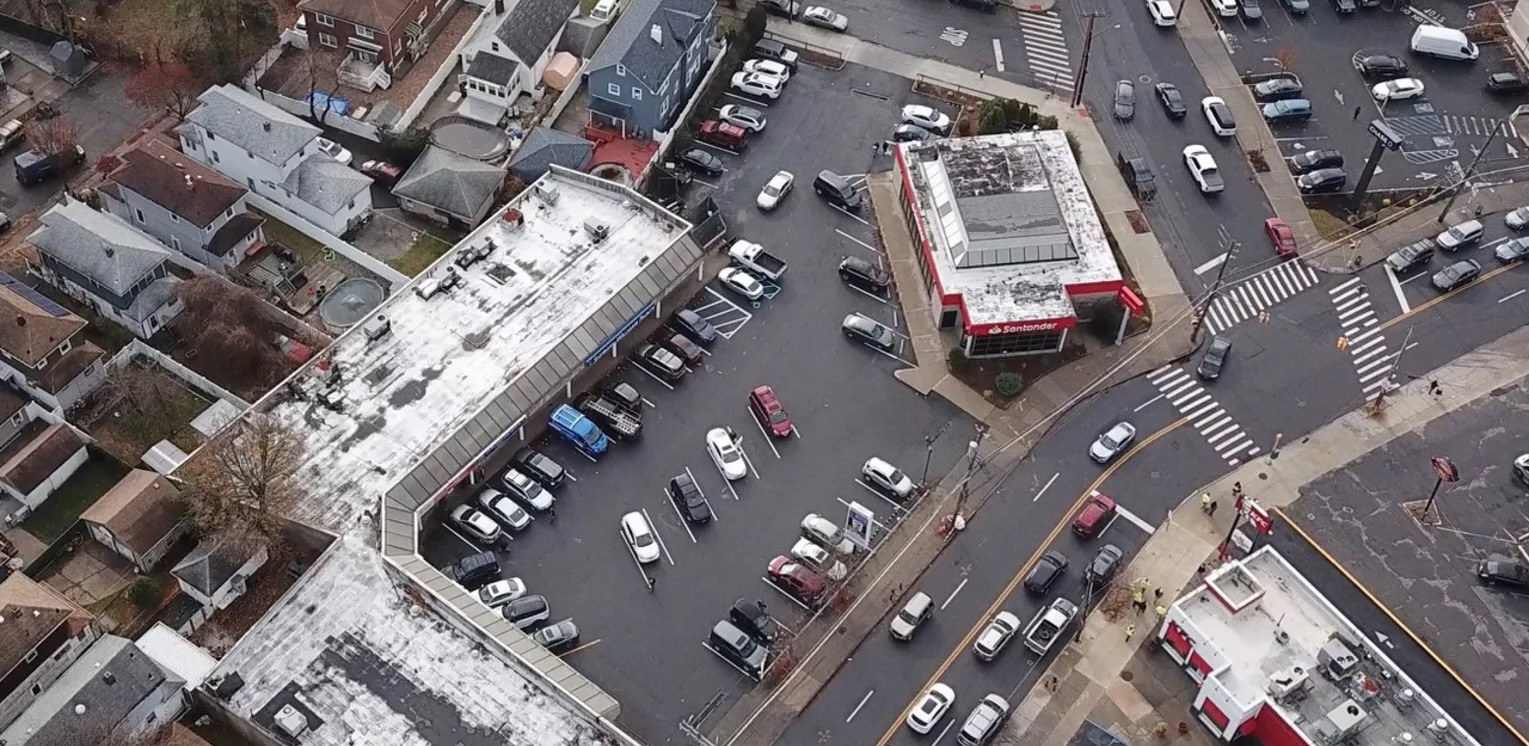
2021 overhead view of the former site at 1440 Forest Avenue

The cemetery was established in the mid-19th century by members of the Second Asbury AME Zion Church, one of Staten Island's earliest black congregations. The church, founded by African-Americans in the Mariners Harbor area, served a growing community of laborers, oystermen, and farmers who were free or formerly enslaved from Staten Island and New Jersey, or originally from states like Maryland and Virginia.

Documentation compiled by the Friends of Abandoned Cemeteries of Staten Island (FACSI) indicates that the land was acquired in 1850 by trustees of the Second Asbury AME Zion Church via a deed from John W. and Tabitha Merrill Blake. The site served as the primary burial ground for the congregation and nearby African-American residents throughout the 19th century, with the last recorded burial being that of Rachel Van Buren, age 100, on December 30, 1903.

Staten Island naturalist and historian William T. Davis referenced the site in his 1889 work Homestead Graves, which described the destruction of Second Asbury AME Zion Church and predicted Cherry Lane's demise.

Records show that by the early 1900s the cemetery was recognized as a tax-exempt burial ground under church ownership. Among those interred were Benjamin Prine, believed to be Staten Island's last surviving person who was born enslaved, as well as members of the DeHart, Crocheron, and Lawrence families.

During the 1950s the property was foreclosed upon for unpaid taxes; since the deed did not specify a cemetery, it was argued that the property was not technically a cemetery, and therefore not tax-exempt. Sidelle Mann, who was born and raised on Staten Island, bought the property at auction in 1954 for $1,000, then sold it to her brother, real estate developer Edward Menden, for $100. It was turned into a Shell station, and then in the 1980s converted into a shopping plaza. No public notice was given to the descendants of those buried there, and the graves were not formally relocated.

== Rediscovery and research ==
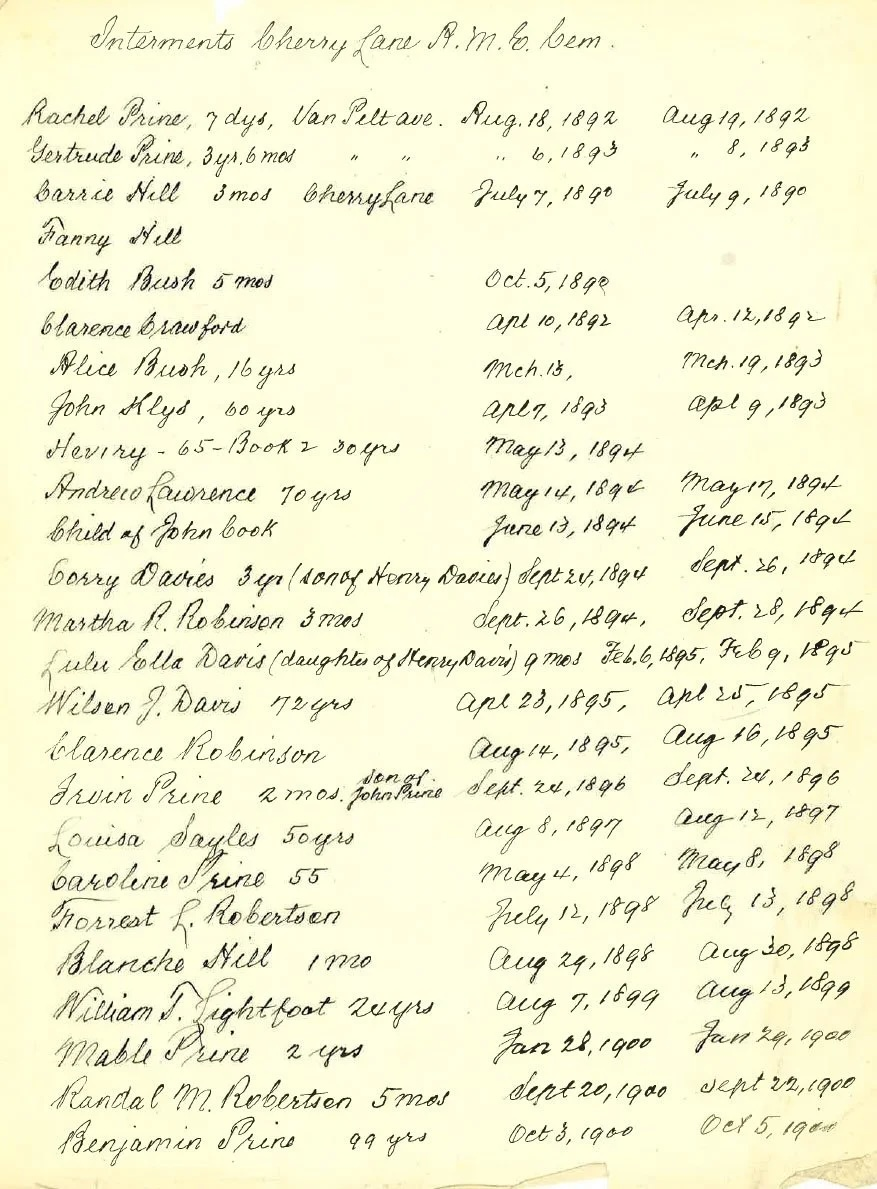
First of two manuscript pages titled Interments Cherry Lane A.M.E. Cem., compiled circa 1920 by Charles W. Leng, Staten Island historian and naturalist. Part of the Collection of the Staten Island Museum.

Interest in the lost burial ground re-emerged in the 2020s through the work of local historians, journalists, and descendant families.

Archival documents, land deeds, and death certificates confirmed that the parcel once functioned as a burial site for members of Second Asbury AME Zion Church and the surrounding community.

Media coverage drew widespread attention to the cemetery's history and the ongoing efforts to acknowledge it publicly. (Note: NowThis, NY1, 1010 WINS, Untapped Cities, PBS/WNET, Atlas Obscura, and Staten Island Advance.)

Community organizers, historians, and descendants collaborated with local officials to document the site's story. Their work highlighted both the historical significance of Staten Island's black history and the pattern of African-American burial grounds being erased through urban development.

== Commemoration ==
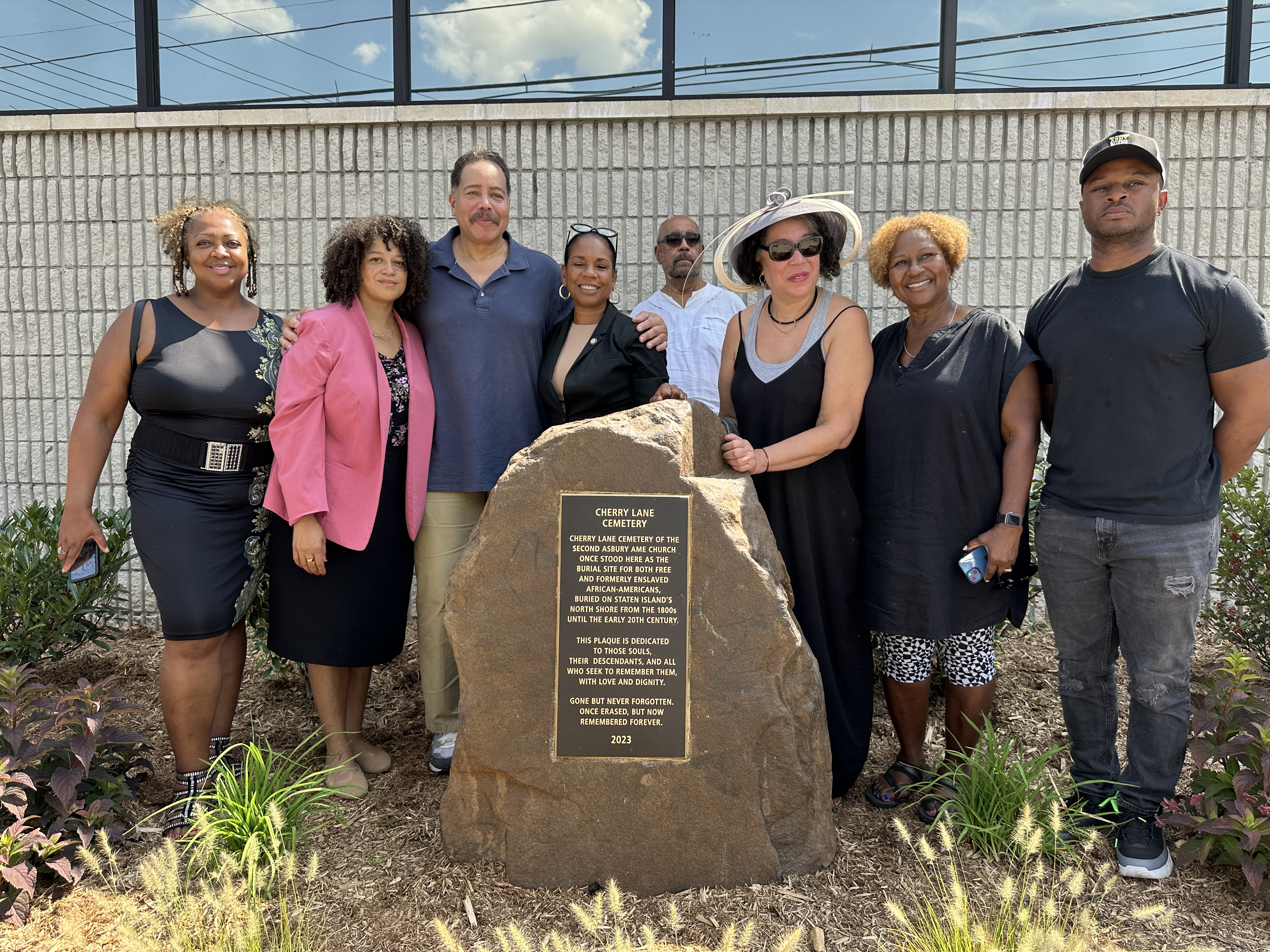
Dedication of the Cherry Lane Cemetery Memorial Garden, Staten Island, August 24, 2024, with descendants, Assembly member Michaelle C. Solages and Councilmember Kamillah Hanks

In 2023, the New York City Council co-named a nearby street "Benjamin Prine Way" in honor of one of the cemetery's best-known interred residents. To date it is the only street in New York City co-named for a formerly enslaved person.

The following year, a memorial garden was dedicated on the grounds of the former cemetery, featuring signage recognizing those buried there and the descendant community's preservation work.

== In media ==
The history of the cemetery is the subject of the documentary American Graveyard, directed by filmmaker Heather Quinlan. It chronicles the rediscovery of the site and the efforts of descendants and community advocates to memorialize it. The film is set to be released in 2027, coinciding with the 200th anniversary of slavery's abolition in New York State.

== See also ==
- African Burial Ground National Monument
- Flatbush African Burial Ground
- Harlem African Burial Ground
- Old Town of Flushing Burial Ground
