= Heather Quinlan =

American filmmaker and writer

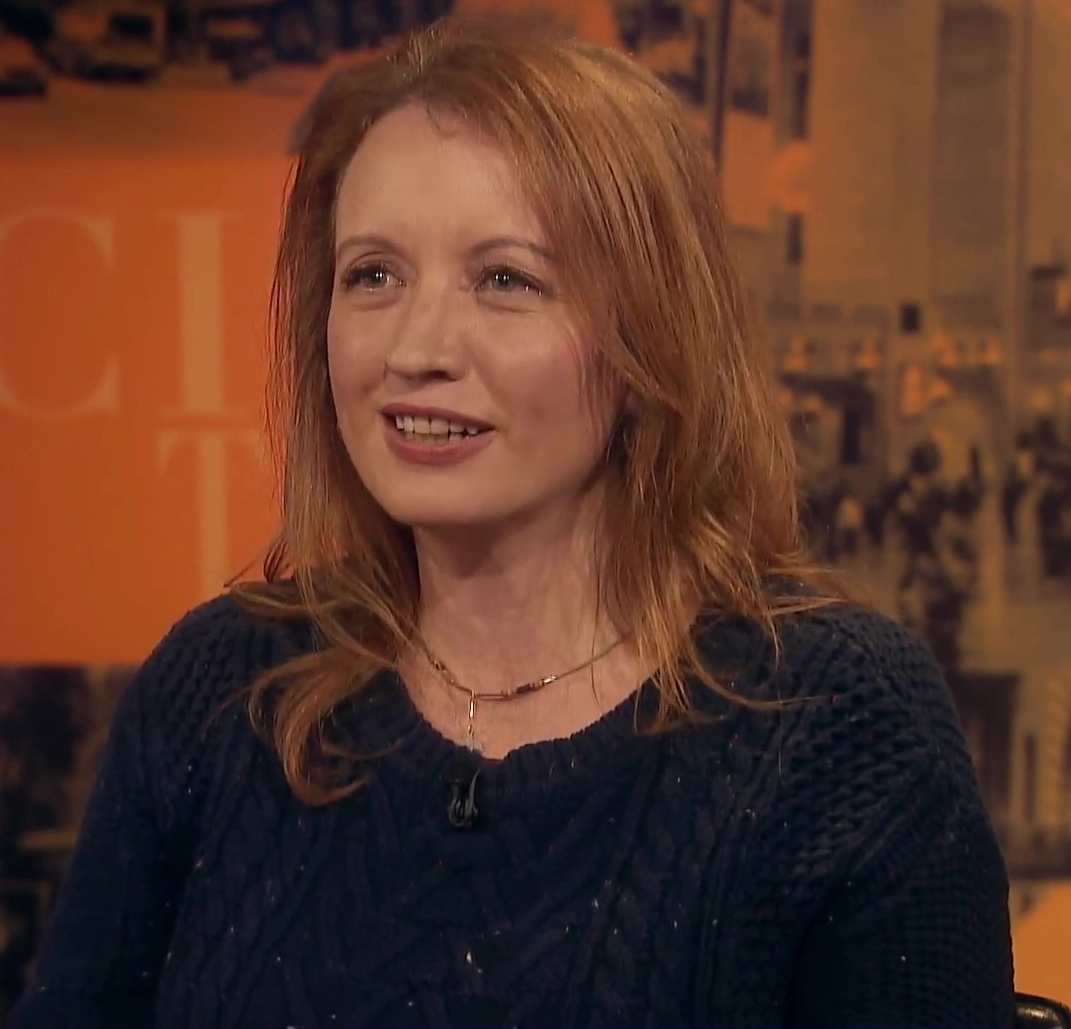
- Quinlan on CUNY TV's City Talk, 2013
- Born: Heather Elizabeth Quinlan; October 12, 1974 (age 51); Bronx, New York, U.S.
- Education: Ithaca College
- Occupations: Director; Writer; Producer
- Years active: 1997–present
- Spouse: Adam McGovern (m. 2020)

Heather Quinlan is an American writer, producer, and documentary filmmaker.

== Early career ==
Quinlan began her career in digital media as an associate web producer for TLC, developing online content for early network specials. She subsequently served as an acquisitions editor for Sterling Publishing's children's book division, helping launch their line of picture books and a middle-school biography series. She later returned to network digital production as a web producer for Discovery Health and the Science Channel, producing content for event coverage such as Punkin Chunkin and live reporting for the inaugural 2008 World Science Festival. In 2010 she returned to TLC to film web-only content for the Cake Boss spin-off, Kitchen Boss.

== Filmmaking ==
In 2011, Quinlan established her independent production company, Canvasback Kid Productions, named after her grandfather, a former bare-knuckle boxer. Her debut short film, O Brooklyn! My Brooklyn!, was called "Charming... an endearing way of making an old poem more relevant" by J. David Goodman of The New York Times.

Two years later, Quinlan released her feature-length documentary If These Knishes Could Talk: The Story of the NY Accent, featuring Pete Hamill, James McBride, Penny Marshall, Amy Heckerling, and Joe Franklin. Funded in part through a campaign recognized as a Kickstarter "Project of the Day," Knishes screened at film festivals nationally and the Library of Congress, and was covered in the "Talk of the Town" section of The New Yorker. It chronicles the evolution of the New York accent and if it is really disappearing.

Following Knishes, Quinlan directed SPOKE: A Short Film About NYC Bikes, which was partially filmed on Google Glass and screened at the Williamsburg International Film Festival.

Quinlan subsequently launched a crowdfunding campaign to direct a feature documentary on the 1986 New York Mets titled Swagger, with television producer Michael Weithorn attached as executive producer. Despite again being named "Project of the Day" on Kickstarter and receiving coverage in national sports media, the project was shelved when Major League Baseball declined to license archival game footage.

In addition to directing, Quinlan served as a producer for the documentary For the Love of Their Brother, which aired on PBS, and production manager for American River, which premiered at the 2022 Montclair Film Festival and aired on WNET. She has also worked in location management on film and television productions, including Woody Allen's Café Society and A Rainy Day in New York; FX's The Americans; HBO's Paterno; and CBS's FBI: Most Wanted.

Her latest feature documentary, American Graveyard, uncovers the history of Cherry Lane Cemetery, a 19th-century African-American cemetery on Staten Island that was paved over in the 1950s. The project has been featured on NowThis and NPR's All Things Considered.

== Books and podcasts ==
In 2018, Quinlan was commissioned by Visible Ink Press to write a history of epidemics, coinciding with the early months of the COVID-19 pandemic. The resulting book, Plagues, Pandemics & Viruses: From the Plague of Athens to Covid-19, was published in 2020 and named an Outstanding Reference Source by the American Library Association in 2021.

Quinlan also hosts the podcasts 86'd: A Podcast About the '86 Mets Film that Didn't Get Made and Cold Storage: The Life and Death of Tom Carvel.

== Filmography ==
Year	Title	Director	Producer
2009	Dinner with Wise Guys	Yes	Yes
2010	O Brooklyn! My Brooklyn!	Yes	Yes
2013	If These Knishes Could Talk: The Story of the NY Accent	Yes	Yes
2013	SPOKE: A Short Film About NYC Bikes	Yes	Yes
2016	For the Love of Their Brother	No	Yes
TBA	American Graveyard	Yes	Yes

== Published works ==
- Quinlan, Heather (2020). Plagues, Pandemics & Viruses: From the Plague of Athens to Covid-19. Visible Ink Press. ISBN 978-1-578-59704-8.
