= Ingram Woods =

Public park in Staten Island, New York

Coordinates: 40°36′33″N 74°08′12″W

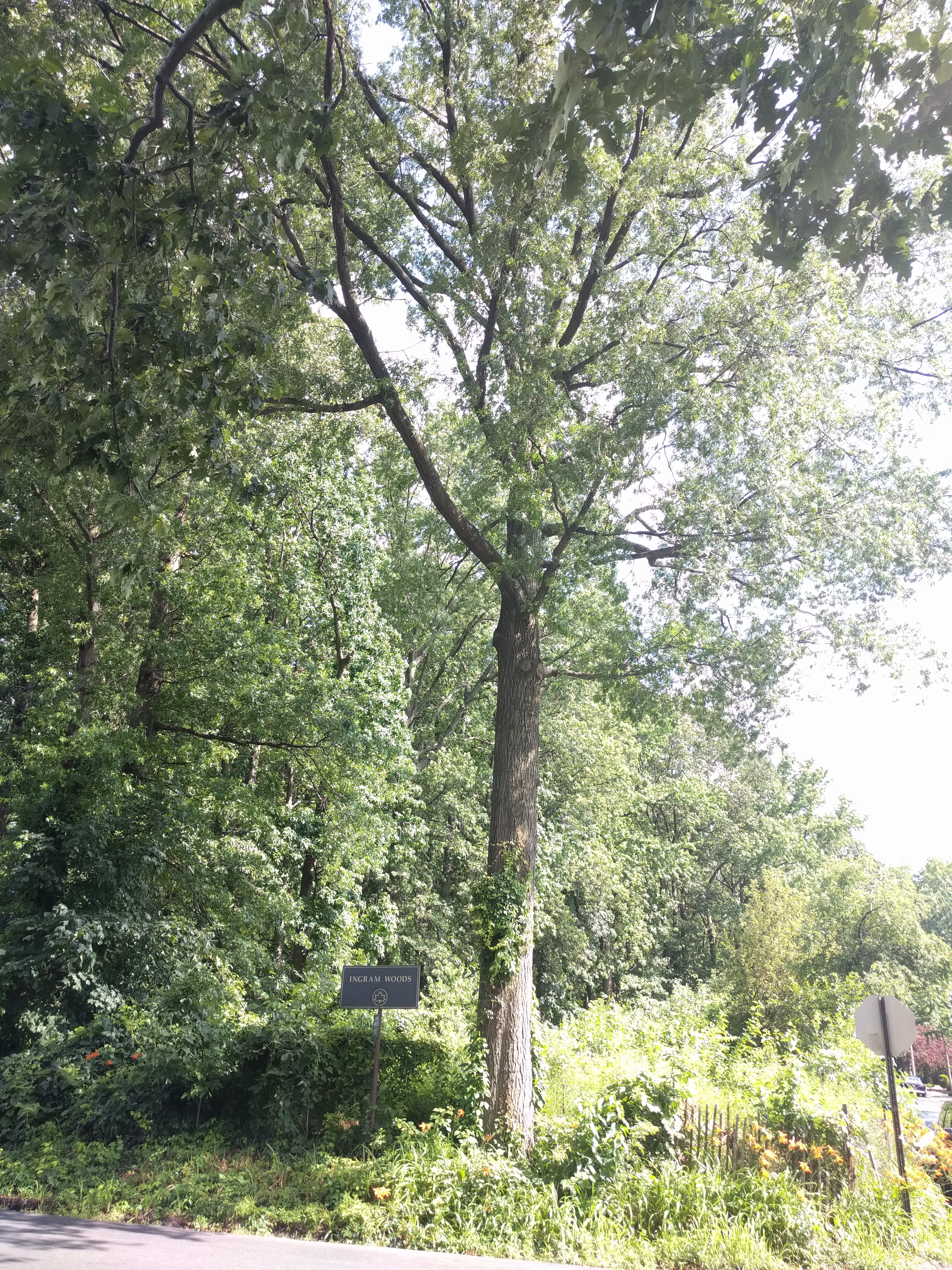
Oak tree in Ingram Woods

Ingram Woods is a 3.7-acre forest preserve in the Westerleigh neighborhood of Staten Island, New York, bound by Warwick Avenue, Purdy Avenue, Ingram Avenue, and Gannon Avenue North. The streets around Ingram Woods Park were laid out in 1907 by the firm of Wood, Harmon & Co. for the planned community of South New York. The properties were offered at the bargain price of $190, but because of the neighborhood's isolated location, only a few homes were built by the time that the City began laying out the Staten Island Expressway.

The property was acquired by the city in 1957 as part of constructing the Expressway. Along the highway's path, four other parks were designated along with Ingram Woods: Bradys Pond Park, Sports Park, Father Macris Park, and Westwood Park. The park contains a lush forest planted with pin oaks, sweetgum, and sugar maple trees.
