= Baron Hirsch Cemetery =

Cemetery on Staten Island, New York City

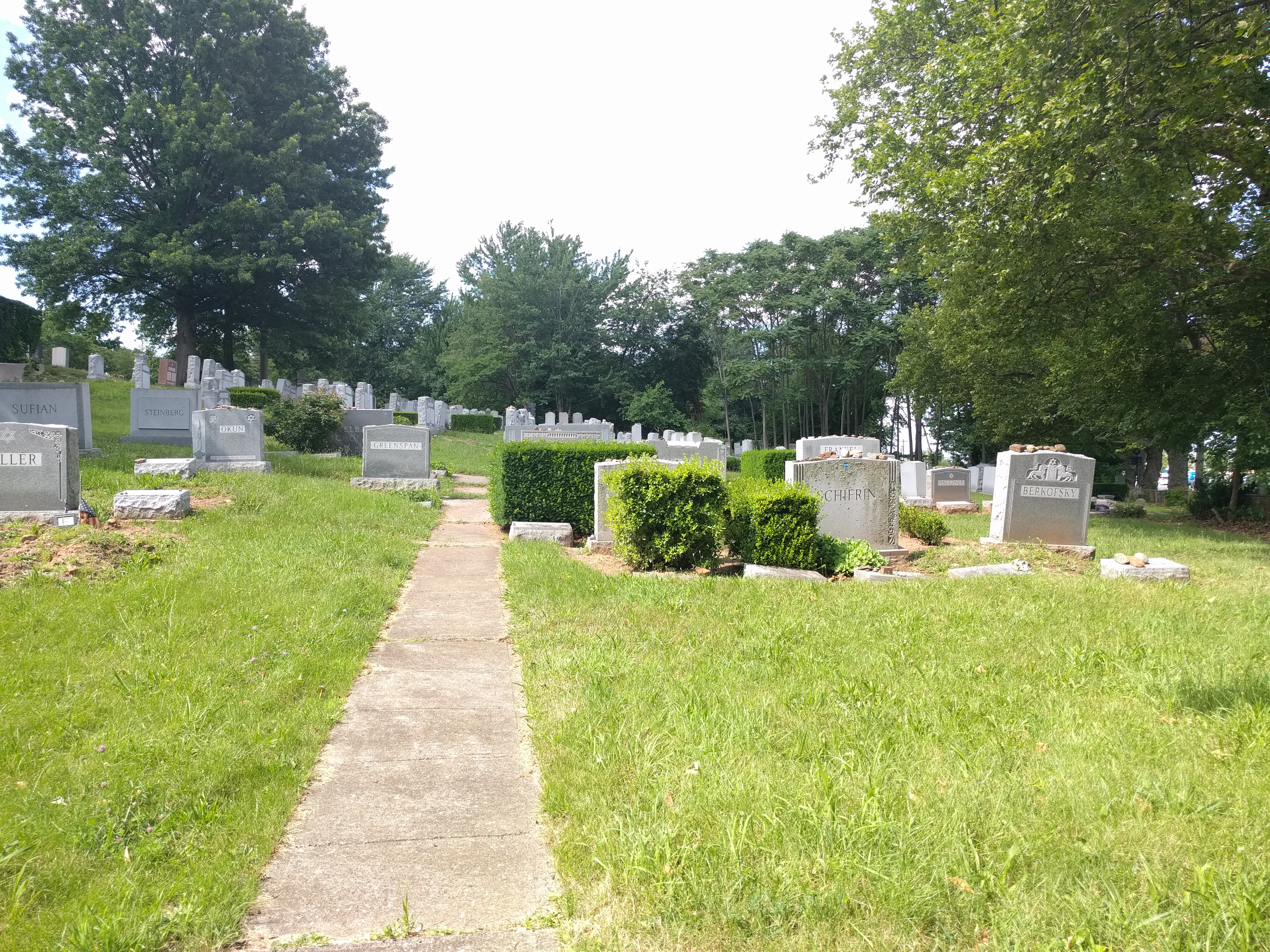
- Interactive map of Baron Hirsch Cemetery

Details
- Established: 1899
- Location: 1126 Richmond Avenue, Graniteville, Staten Island, New York
- Country: United States
- Coordinates: 40.6221°N 74.1549°W
- Type: Jewish
- Size: about 80 acres (0.32 km^{2})
- Find a Grave: Baron Hirsch Cemetery

Baron Hirsch Cemetery is a large Jewish cemetery in the neighborhood of Graniteville, on Staten Island, in New York City, and named for Baron Maurice de Hirsch.

== History ==
Baron Hirsch was established in 1899.

In January 1960, the cemetery drew national attention when 87 headstones were smeared with yellow paint and the words “Fuhrer,” and the German words for death and fatherland. That incident and others led President Dwight D. Eisenhower to declare that freedom and decency could be destroyed everywhere if Americans ignored the "virus of bigotry" or permitted it "to spread one inch."

Nevertheless, continued vandalism, as well as apathy and neglect remained problems at Baron Hirsch for decades, resulting in numerous overturned grave markers.

A major cleanup of the grounds was started in March 2011 with the help of the Community Alliance for Jewish-affiliated Cemeteries, and a fence was built to enclose the cemetery. The 121st precinct house of the New York Police Department, which is adjacent to the cemetery and overlooks it, opened in 2013 and may have helped curb vandalism as well.

The cemetery is composed of about 500 plots or sections belonging to synagogues, Jewish associations, family circles, and most commonly, landsmanshaftn. Most plots are entered via gates or pairs of stone columns. Some of the landsmanshaftn plots have monuments dedicated to Holocaust victims of the Nazis in their ancestral town, including plots for immigrants from Wodzislaw, Poland; Gvardeyskoye and Nadvirna, Ukraine; and Hlusk, Belarus.

== Notable burials ==
- Samuel Irving Newhouse Sr. (1895–1979), newspaper publisher, founder of Advance Publications; and other members of the Newhouse publishing family.
- Joseph Papp (1921–1991) – theater producer, theater director, and founder of The Public Theater
- William Shemin (1896–1973) – Medal of Honor and Purple Heart recipient
- Elliot Willensky (1943–2010) – composer, lyricist, and music producer
- Rabbi Herman Steiner (1850?–1916) – famous brother of Rabbi Yeshayale Steiner of Kerestir, Hungary
