= First Shearith Israel Graveyard =

Historic cemetery in Manhattan, New York

- U.S. National Register of Historic Places
- U.S. Historic district – Contributing property
- New York State Register of Historic Places
- New York City Landmark
- Location: 55-57 Saint James Place, Manhattan, New York, US
- Coordinates: 40°42′45″N 73°59′54″W
- Area: Less than 1 acre (0.40 ha)
- Built: 1682
- Part of: Two Bridges Historic District (ID03000845)
- NRHP reference No.: 80002689
- NYSRHP No.: 06101.000069
- NYCL No.: 0091

Significant dates
- Added to NRHP: April 17, 1980
- Designated CP: August 29, 2003
- Designated NYSRHP: June 23, 1980
- Designated NYCL: February 1, 1966

First Shearith Israel Graveyard, also known as Chatham Square Cemetery, is a tiny Jewish graveyard located in the Two Bridges neighborhood of Lower Manhattan in New York City. It is the oldest of three Manhattan graveyards currently maintained by Congregation Shearith Israel (Hebrew, "Remnant of Israel"), which is itself the oldest Jewish congregation in North America. (The Congregation was formed by Spanish and Portuguese Sephardic Jewish immigrants in 1654.) Today, the cemetery is a mere fragment of its original extent. Only about a hundred headstones and aboveground tombs can still be seen in what remains of the old burial ground, which rises slightly above street level. It is the only remaining 17th-century structure in Manhattan.

== History ==
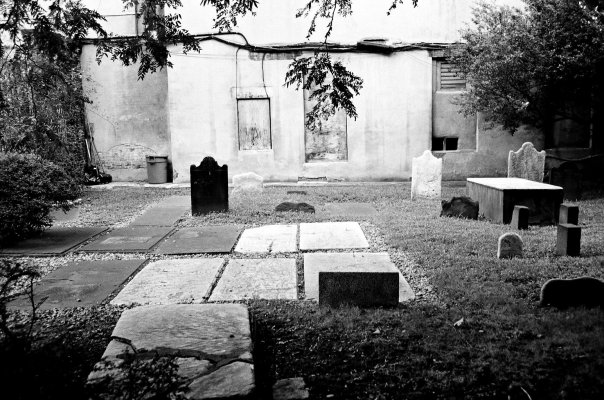
Graveyard

What is now called the "First Shearith Israel Graveyard," near Chatham Square in Lower Manhattan, was in use from 1683 to 1833. An older cemetery called "Beth Haim," dated to 1656 — two years after the community arrived, was located around the corner of Madison and Oliver streets. The site for First Shearith Israel Graveyard was originally on a hill overlooking the East River in an open area at the northern periphery of the British–Dutch colonial settlement. The plot was purchased in 1682 by Joseph Bueno de Mesquita, and its first interment was for his relative, Benjamin Bueno de Mesquita, the following year. The cemetery expanded in the 1700s so that at one point it extended from Chatham Square over what is now the upper part of Oliver Street down to Bancker (now Madison) Street.

In a letter in 1776, a staff officer of General George Washington recommended emplacing an artillery battery "at the foot of the Jews' burying ground" to help secure Long Island Sound. American prisoners of war were buried en masse in entrenchments beyond the graveyard. In 1823, a city ordinance prohibited burials south of Canal Street, compelling the congregation to rely on its second burial ground, consecrated in 1805 at West 11th Street in Greenwich Village. (Notwithstanding this, a few more burials took place at Chatham Square up to 1833.) Much of this burden was alleviated in 1829, when Shearith Israel's third cemetery was consecrated at 21st Street just west of 6th Avenue.

Encroaching development and erosion necessitated several instances over the years in which the congregation was forced to reduce the size of the Chatham Square Cemetery and disinter bodies, which were moved to their three other graveyards. In 1851, city public health officials prohibited burial south of 86th Street and in partnership with other synagogues, the congregation purchased a large plot of land in Ridgewood, Queens as a fourth cemetery. The most notable of these instances was in 1855, when a large portion of the cemetery was seized by eminent domain. This accommodated expansion of the Bowery — including the cut-through of today's St. James Place — and some 256 graves were removed.

Today, access to the cemetery is by appointment only.

== Burials ==
From 1656 until 1825, all of the practicing Jews of New York City belonged to the Shearith Israel congregation and were buried here, including 22 who fought in the Revolutionary War. Among the notable burials (which may include those whose bodies were later removed) were:

- Reverend Gershom Mendes Seixas (1745–1816), the first American born Jewish spiritual leader
- Dr. Walter Jonas Judah, the second Jew known to attend an American medical school (King's College, now Columbia University) and the first native-born Jew to do so; he died at age 20 of yellow fever
