= Charles Bathgate Beck =

Charles Bathgate Beck (1853–1893) was a wealthy lawyer who lived in what is now the West Farms section of the Bronx.

He left in his will $300,000 (equivalent to $10,500,000 in 2024) to Columbia University to endow the law school's Charles Bathgate Beck prize. He also left $100,000 (equivalent to $150,000,000 in 2021) to The First Presbyterian Church of West Farms for the construction of a new building. Bathgate, a trustee of the church, left the money in memory of his mother.

Charles had inherited his estate from his uncle, Alexander Bathgate. Alexander was not known to have any legitimate children until after his death when his housekeeper, Delia Malloy, claimed to be his wife and the mother of his two children. The children contested the will.

In 1904, 391 lots which had been part of the Beck estate were sold by J. Clarence Davies to Henry Morgenthau. (Note: The source gives the last name as "Morgenthal"; this is probably a typo.) During the title search, it was discovered that title to the lots, worth $240,000 (equivalent to $8,100,000 in 2024) had previously been transferred by one of the last three Bathgate heirs to his daughter, Miss Margaret Bathgate during a period of financial trouble. It had subsequently been intended that the title be transferred back, but this second transfer had never been properly filed.
