= Westerleigh, Staten Island =

Neighborhood in New York City

Coordinates: 40°37′05″N 74°08′13″W

Westerleigh is a residential neighborhood in the north-western part of Staten Island in New York City.

== Geography ==
Westerleigh is in the north-west quadrant of the borough and is bordered by Castleton Corners to the east at Jewett Avenue, by Graniteville to the west at Stewart Avenue, by Meiers Corners to the south at Victory Boulevard, and by Port Richmond to the north at Forest Avenue.

Westerleigh occupies high ground on Staten Island. While not as high as Todt Hill (the city's tallest point), from certain vantage points Westerleigh affords views of Newark, New Jersey, and farther afield on a clear day. The neighborhood has an abundance of coniferous and deciduous trees; including acacia, blue spruce, cedar, chestnut, elm, honey locust, paulownia, pin and royal oak, sweet gum, sycamore, tulip poplar, yew and many types of pine, some of which reach 75 feet (23 m) or more in height. On the neighborhood's southern side near the Staten Island Expressway is Ingram Woods, a remnant of a larger forest that has been preserved as an undeveloped park.

== History ==
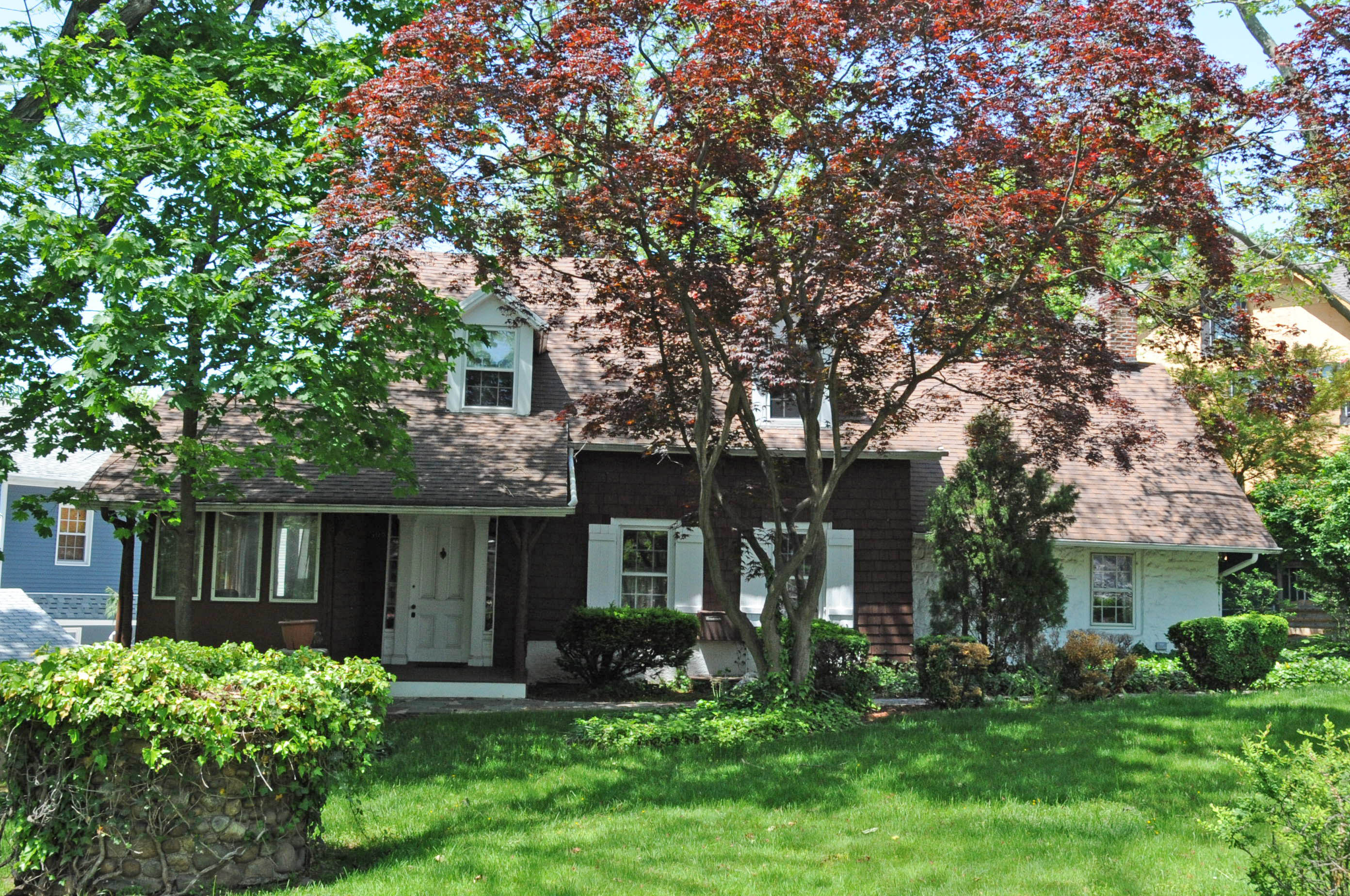
House built in 1730

Westerleigh attracted notice when a temperance group, the National Prohibition Campground Association, bought 25 acres (10 ha) of land there in 1877, and named the property Prohibition Park — noted chiefly today for the fact that the official climate records for Staten Island are compiled at the site. Many of the local streets are named after early leaders of the Prohibition movement (Neal Dow, Clinton B. Fisk), or for states that supported anti-liquor laws (such as Maine and Ohio).

Some of Westerleigh's earliest residents excelled in letters including Isaac K. Funk, co-founder of Funk and Wagnalls, and poet Edwin Markham. Heiress Amy Vanderbilt also once lived there. The neighborhood gained much local attention for the abundance of patriotic decorations festooned on its homes in the aftermath of the September 11, 2001 attacks.

One of the oldest Boy Scouts of America groups, Troop #2, was formed in 1912 and operates out of the Immanuel Union Church on Jewett Avenue.

Westerleigh is also home to the oldest tennis club in the US, tennis having been introduced to the US (from England, via Bermuda) at the home here of Mary Ewing Outerbridge. She played the first game in the US at the Staten Island Cricket Club on an hourglass shaped court. The location, on College Avenue, still sports a tennis court.

The Peter Houseman House was listed on the National Register of Historic Places in 1982.

== Demographics ==
For census purposes, the New York City Department of City Planning classifies Westerleigh as part of a larger Neighborhood Tabulation Area called Westerleigh-Castleton Corners SI0105. This designated neighborhood had 31,458 inhabitants based on data from the 2020 United States Census. This was an increase of 1,642 persons (5.5%) from the 29,816 counted in 2010. The neighborhood had a population density of 17.9 inhabitants per acre (14,500/sq mi; 5,600/km^{2}).

The racial makeup of the neighborhood was 62.8% (20,597) White (Non-Hispanic), 4.1% (1,348) Black (Non-Hispanic), 19.8% (6,486) Asian, and 3% (971) from two or more races. Hispanic or Latino of any race were 10.4% (3,420) of the population. However, In recent years; more racial diversity has been seen in southeastern sections also with tracked youth crime and offensive activity in proximity to the Watchogue Rd curve, despite not reaching as high of levels compared to other areas of the North Shore.

According to the 2020 United States Census, this area has many cultural communities of over 1,000 inhabitants. This include residents who identify as Mexican, Puerto Rican, English, Polish, German, Irish, Italian, and Chinese.

The largest age group was people 50-64 years old, which made up 21.5% of the residents. 71.8% of the households had at least one family present. Out of the 11,386 households, 53.8% had a married couple (21.8% with a child under 18), 3.9% had a cohabiting couple (1.2% with a child under 18), 16.1% had a single male (1.4% with a child under 18), and 26.1% had a single female (3.6% with a child under 18). 31.4% of households had children under 18. In this neighborhood, 27.6% of non-vacant housing units are renter-occupied.

== Notable people ==
- Edwin Markham Poet Laureate of Oregon and school principal

== Education ==
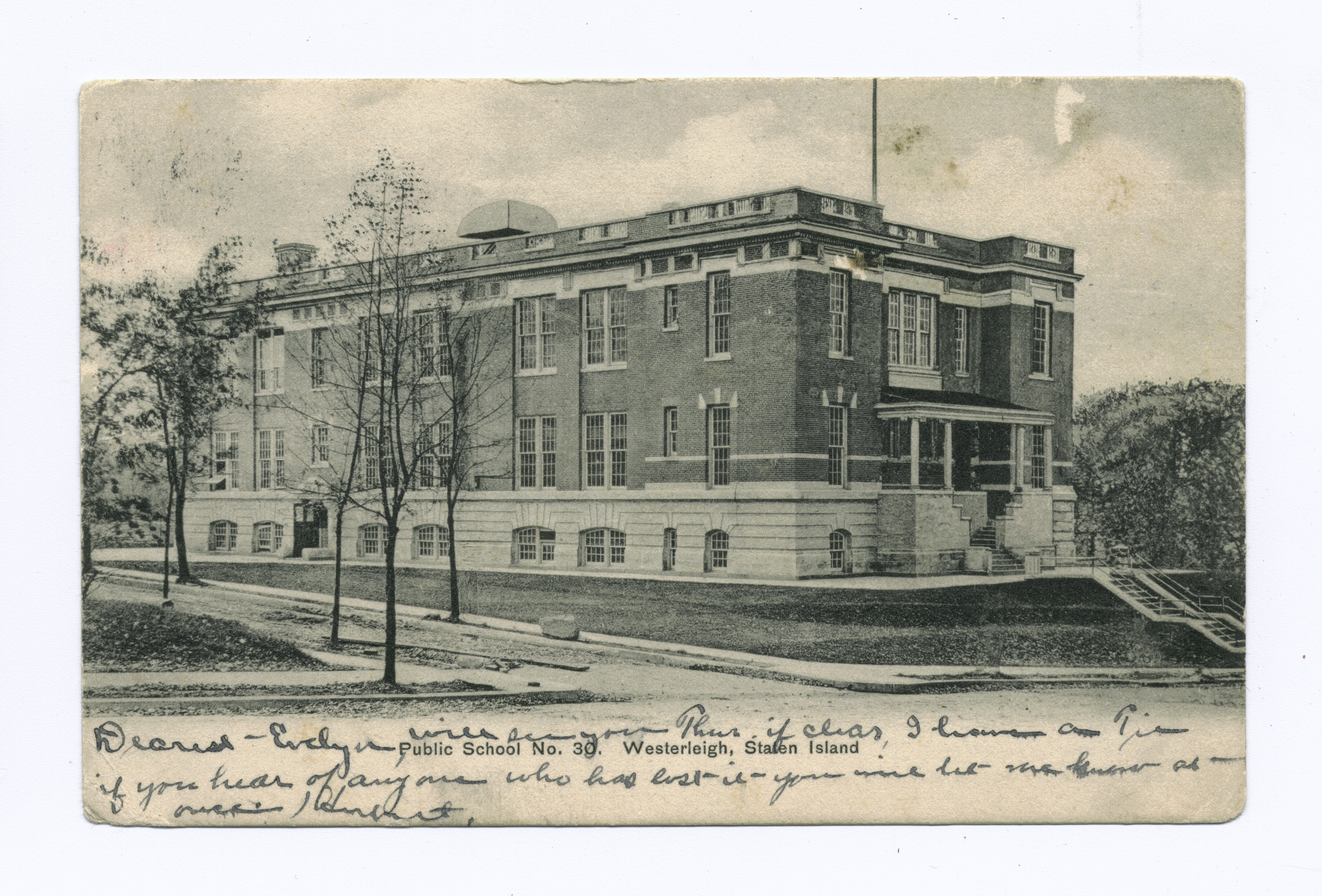
Public School No. 30, Westerleigh, early 20th century

=== Schools ===
Many Westerleigh residents are zoned for PS 30, IS 51, Susan E. Wagner High School and Port Richmond High School.

=== Library ===
The New York Public Library (NYPL)'s Todt Hill-Westerleigh branch is located at 2550 Victory Boulevard on the border between Willowbrook and Westerleigh. The three-story branch opened in 1991.

== Transportation ==
Westerleigh is served by a number of local and express buses. The S57 local bus and the SIM3 and SIM34 express buses to Manhattan run along Watchogue Road. The S62, S92 and S93 local buses travel along Victory Boulevard, while the S66 local bus travels along Jewett Avenue. Farther north, the S48 and S98 local buses and the SIM30 and SIM35 express buses serve Forest Avenue, and the SIM35 also serve Manor Road at Westerleigh's eastern edge.
