= Linden Hill Jewish Cemetery =

Cemetery in Ridgewood, Queens

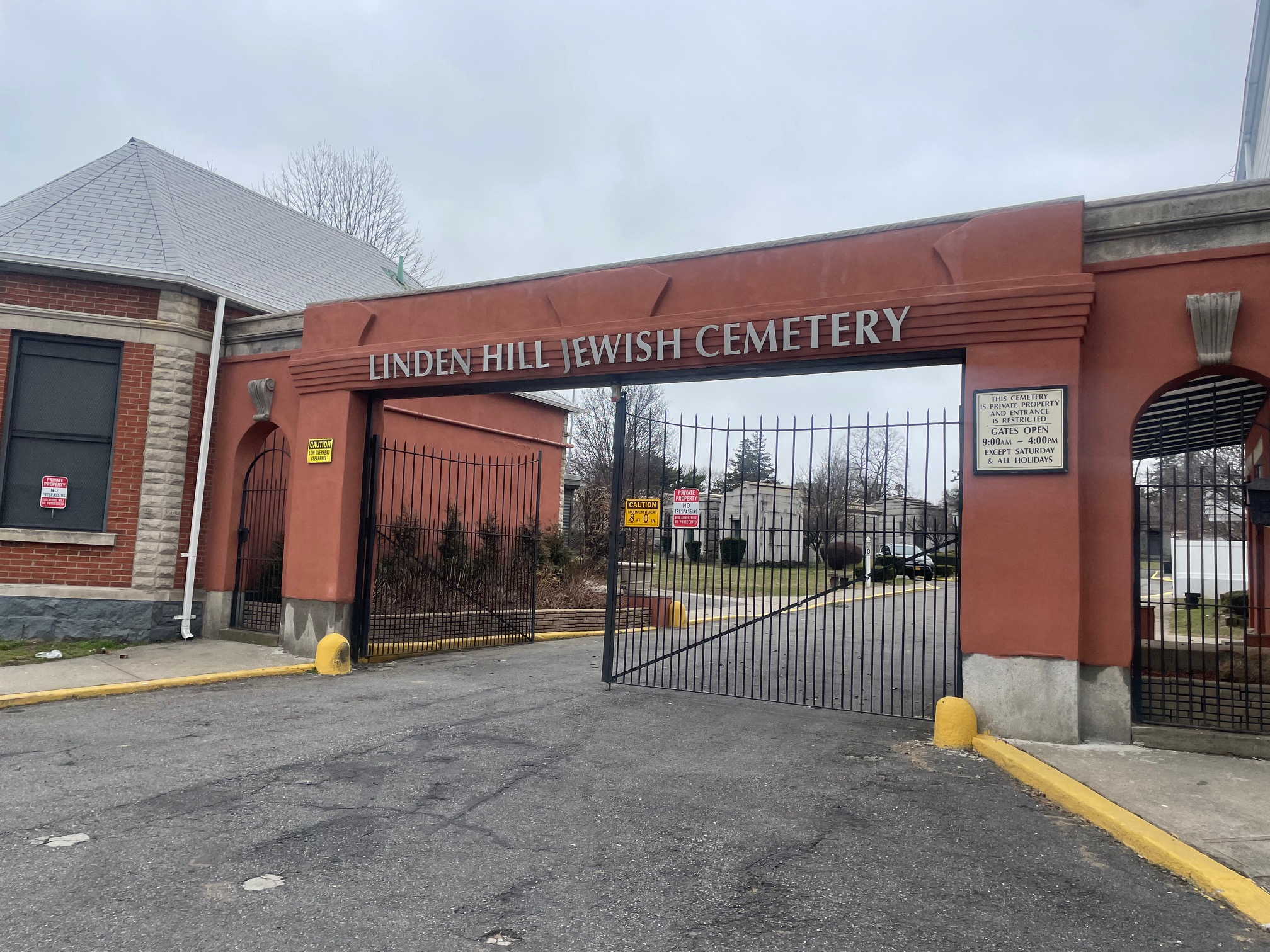
- Interactive map of Linden Hill Jewish Cemetery

Details
- Established: c. 1850
- Location: Ridgewood, Queens
- Country: United States
- Coordinates: 40°42′44″N 73°54′49″W

Linden Hill Jewish Cemetery is a cemetery in Ridgewood, Queens, New York, United States. It was founded by Congregation Ahavat Chesed, now known as the Central Synagogue.
