= Rural Cemetery Act =

New York cemetery statute

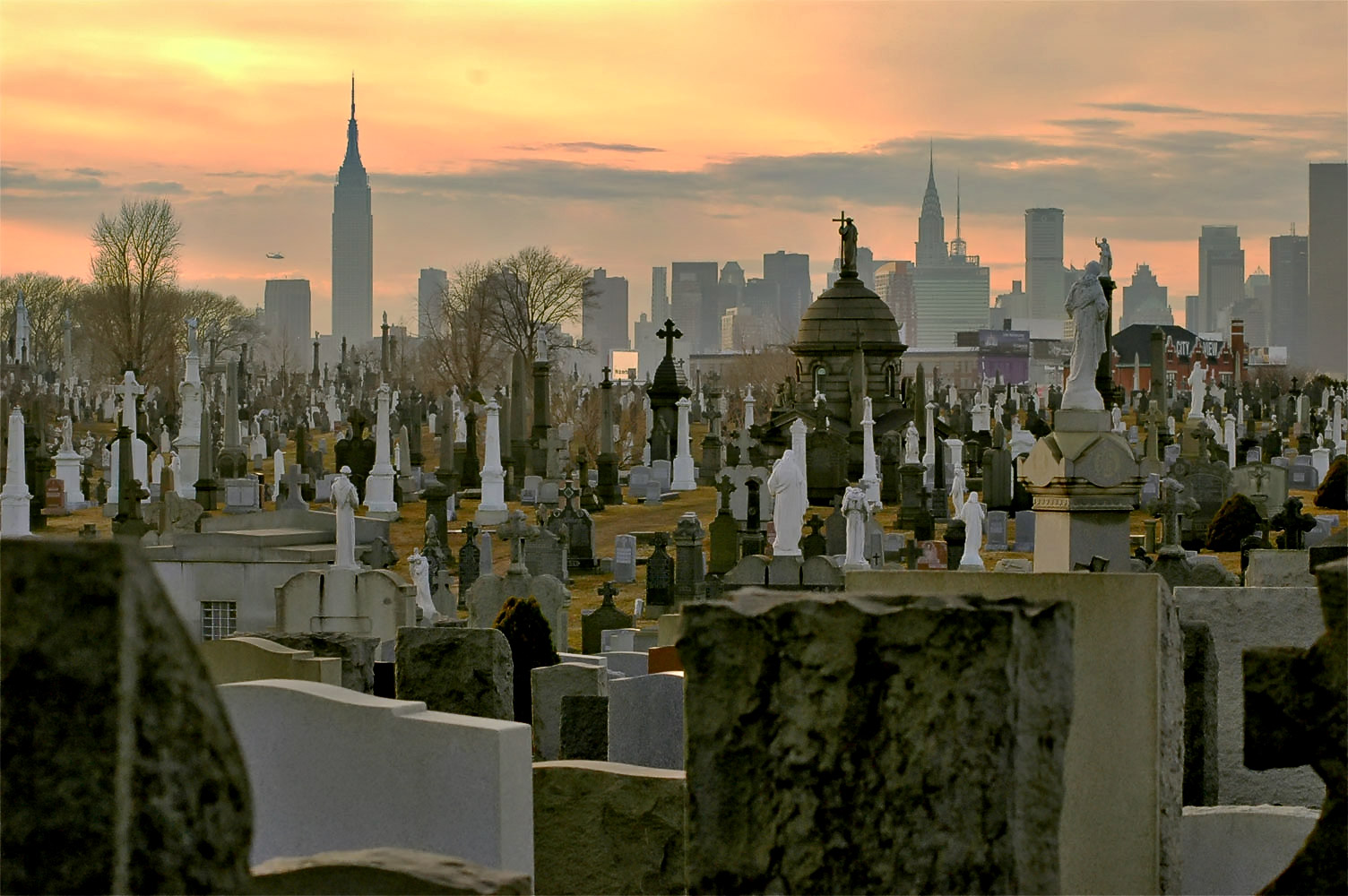
Calvary Cemetery in Queens (Manhattan skyline in background) was one of the first new cemeteries established after passage of the Rural Cemetery Act.

The Rural Cemetery Act was a law passed by the New York Legislature on April 27, 1847, that authorized commercial burial grounds in rural New York state. The law led to burial of human remains becoming a commercial business for the first time, replacing the practice of burying the dead in churchyards and on private farmland. One effect of the law was the development of a large concentration of cemeteries along the border between the New York City boroughs of Queens and Brooklyn, often called the "Cemetery Belt".

The law's enactment came during an era when a burgeoning urban population was crowding out Manhattan churchyards traditionally used for burials and the concept of the rural cemetery on the outskirts of a city was becoming stylish.

== Provisions and effects of the law ==
The law authorized nonprofit entities to establish cemeteries on rural land and sell burial plots, and it exempted from property taxation land that was so used. A few rural cemeteries had been established in New York before the new law was passed (including Green-Wood Cemetery in 1838 and Albany Rural Cemetery in 1844), but the law's passage soon led to the establishment of more new cemeteries near Manhattan, particularly in western Queens. The Act was significant because it was made easier to establish charitable corporations for rural cemeteries. This Act was part of the larger movement for general incorporation statutes, so that those wishing to form corporations no longer needed to get a special act passed by the state legislature. The ease of incorporation facilitated the development of charitable corporations. Both churches and land speculators responded to the new law by purchasing rural land for cemeteries. The move to rural burial grounds was accelerated by public suspicion that contamination from graveyards had been a cause of the epidemics of cholera that occurred in New York City in 1832 and 1849. In 1852 the Common Council of New York City passed a law prohibiting new burials in the city, which then consisted only of Manhattan Island. The City of Brooklyn (which comprised a small area of what is now Brooklyn) had passed a similar law in 1849.

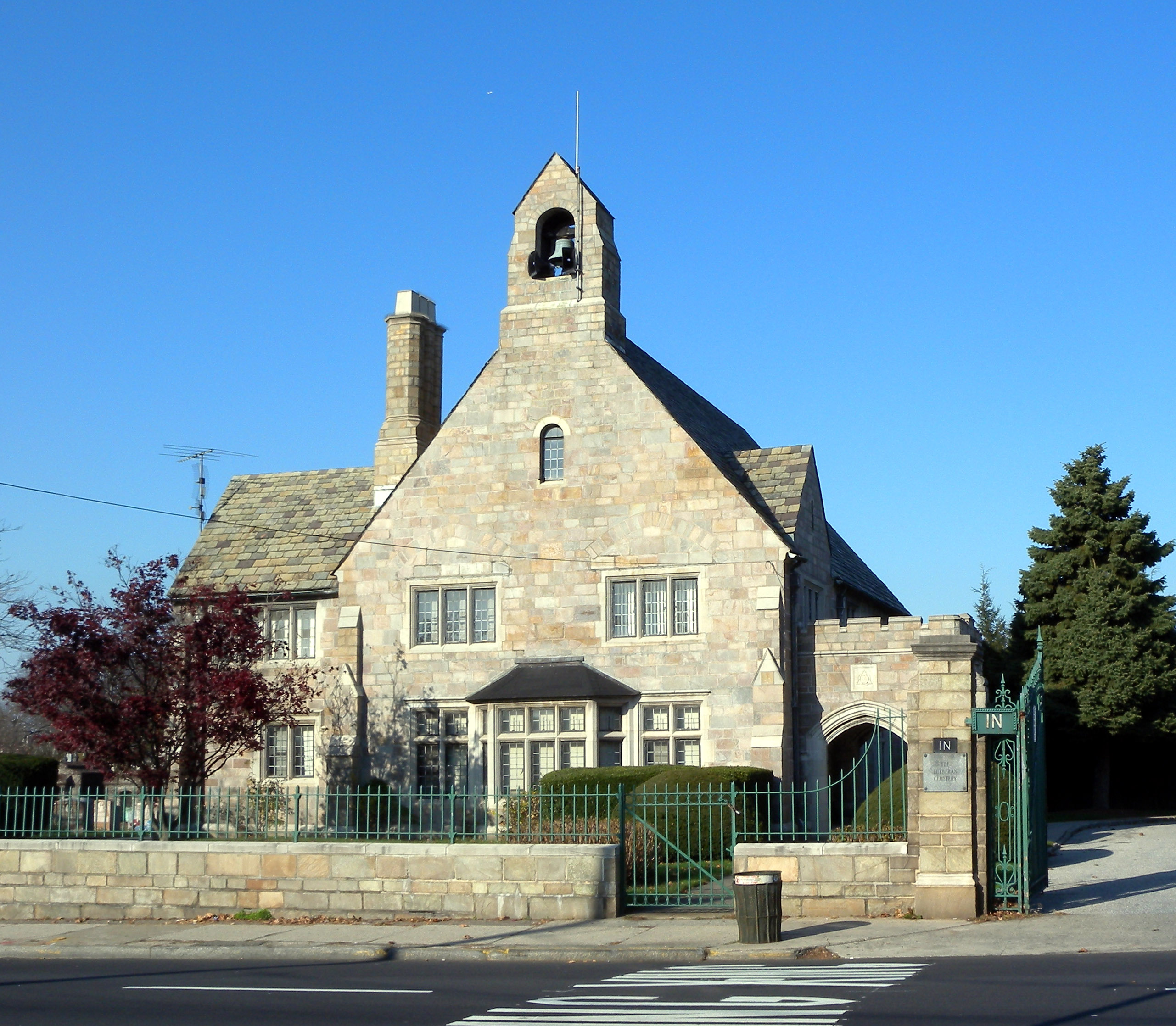
Lutheran Cemetery

Calvary Cemetery, in Queens, which recorded its first burial in 1848, was created on land that the trustees of St. Patrick's Cathedral had begun to buy up two years earlier. Cypress Hills Cemetery, on the Queens–Brooklyn boundary line, was the first nonreligious cemetery to be formed in Queens under the new law. Its first burial also took place in 1848. Lutheran Cemetery traces its beginnings to 1852, when Frederick William Geissenhainer, pastor of St. Paul's German Lutheran Church in Manhattan, bought 225 acres (91 ha) in Middle Village, Queens, for a non-sectarian cemetery that was known in its early years as Lutheran Cemetery and later became All Faiths Cemetery. Other Queens and Brooklyn cemeteries established in the earliest years of the new law included Cemetery of the Evergreens on the Brooklyn–Queens border (founded in 1849 as a nonsectarian cemetery), Mount Olivet Cemetery in Queens (founded in 1850), and St. Michael's Cemetery in Queens (founded in 1852). In other parts of the state, rural cemeteries established after the passage of the Act included Oakwood Cemetery in Troy, founded in 1848, and Oakwood Cemetery in Syracuse, dedicated in 1859.

With the availability of new cemetery land outside the city, existing graveyards in Manhattan were abolished to make way for new development, with their gravestones removed and the human remains disinterred and reburied outside the city. Between 1854 and 1856, more than 15,000 bodies were exhumed from churchyards in Manhattan and Williamsburg and moved to Cypress Hills Cemetery. Over the decades, Cypress Hills Cemetery alone is estimated to have reburied the remains of 35,000 people disinterred from their original burial sites in Manhattan. Other rural cemeteries that reinterred remains originally buried in Manhattan graveyards include Calvary and Evergreens Cemeteries in Queens, Green-Wood Cemetery in south Brooklyn, and Woodlawn Cemetery in The Bronx. Often, unidentified bones were reburied in mass graves. During construction of the Brooklyn Bridge, which was started in 1870, bodies buried at Sands Street Methodist Church in Brooklyn were exhumed and moved to the Cemetery of the Evergreens.

The New York City–area cemeteries established under the Rural Cemetery Act grew very large. In 1880, All Faiths Cemetery had more burials than any other non-sectarian cemetery in the U.S., and in 1904 it was the burial site for all 1,021 people who died when the excursion boat SS General Slocum caught fire and sank during a Sunday School outing. As of the 1990s Calvary Cemetery held nearly three million graves.

== Long-term impacts ==
The Rural Cemetery Act led to Queens being a borough of cemeteries. Queens is home to 29 cemeteries holding more than five million graves and entombments, so that the "dead population" of the borough is more than twice the size of its live population. The large concentration of cemeteries on the border of Brooklyn and Queens is another effect of the law. Under the Act, each individual cemetery organization was limited to no more than 250 acres (1 km^{2}) in one county, but some organizations circumvented that limit by purchasing larger parcels straddling the boundaries of two counties. As result, 17 cemeteries straddle the border between Queens and Brooklyn, many of which are located on the "Cemetery Belt". As with Queens, the "dead population" of Brooklyn is estimated to exceed its living population.

In 1917 a state legislator from Queens complained that the law and the concentration of cemeteries that it had produced resulted in more than one-fifth of Queens' land being exempt from property tax. As of 1918 more than 22,000 acres (89 km^{2}) of land in Queens were owned by private tax-exempt cemeteries. Under current New York law, all cemetery property is exempt from property taxation, but current law allows the governments of Brooklyn, Queens, and certain other New York counties to limit the establishment of new cemeteries within their boundaries.
