= Griffins Mills Presbyterian Church =

Coordinates: 42.724782°N 78.665516°W

Griffins Mills Presbyterian Church is located in the town of Aurora at 1807 Mill Road, West Falls, New York, 14170 in the hamlet of Griffins Mills. The church is part of the Presbytery of Western New York which is part of the Synod of the Northeast, a regional body of the Presbyterian Church (USA). Griffins Mills Church is one of the oldest active churches in Erie County.

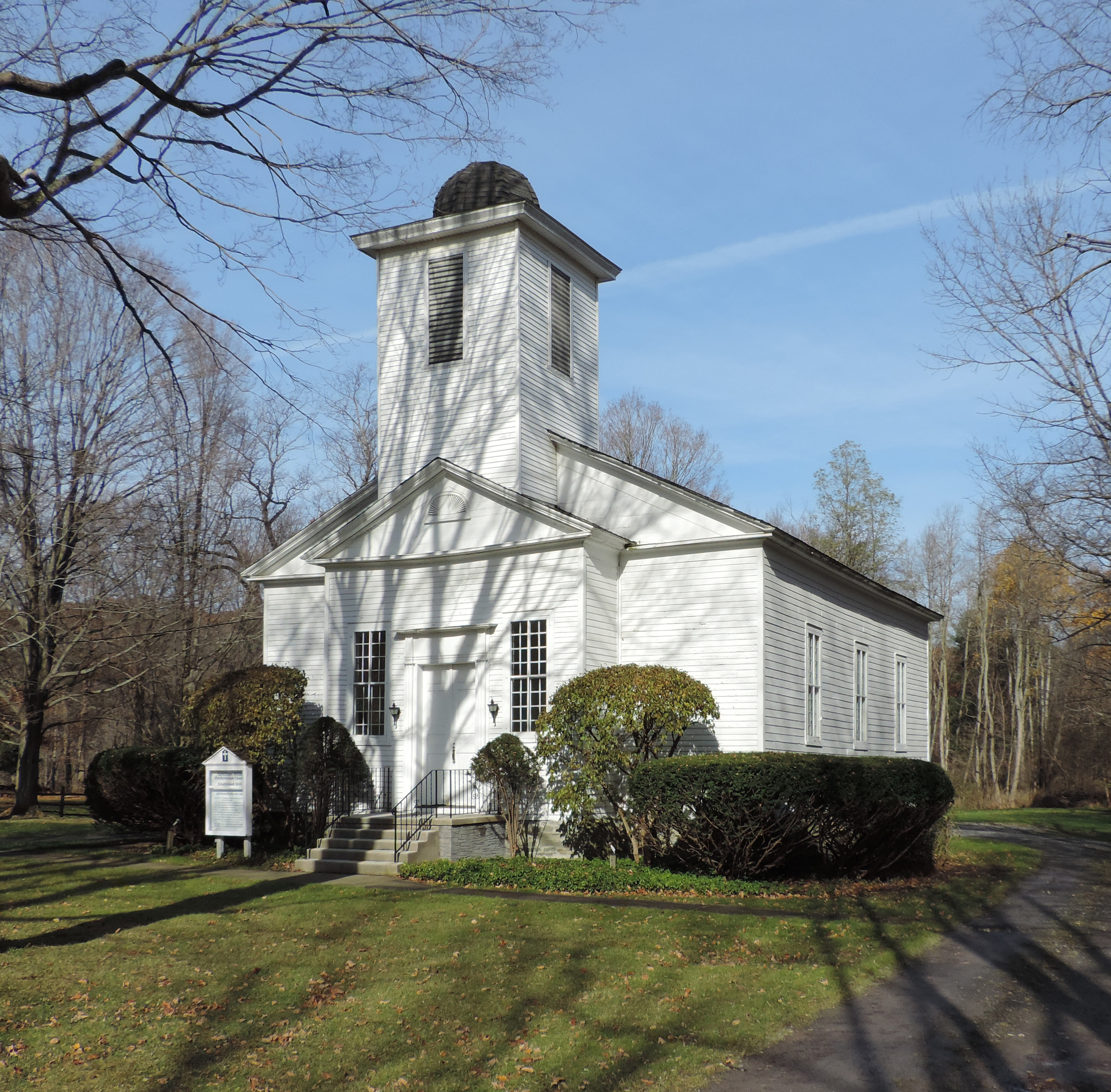
Front view of Griffins Mills Church

== History ==
=== Rev. John Spencer, minister and evangelist ===
Rev. John Spencer was a wandering evangelist that is credited with organizing 28 churches and the probable founding of 30 others. Spencer was born in 1758, served as a lieutenant in Capt. Peter Van Rensselaer's Company; Col. Marinus Willet's Reg’t, New York Levies and was a veteran of many battles in the Revolutionary War, including Bunker Hill. Afterwards, he came home to Spencertown to start his life as a farmer and husband, and then moved to Fort Dayton near what is now known as Herkimer, New York. Around 1804, after studying for the ministry, he sold his farm and moved his wife, Rebecca, and 8 children over three hundred miles west through the wilderness of western New York to a newly settled town of Sheridan in Chautauqua County. He conducted the first religious meeting in the town in 1807. Besides establishing a homestead and farm, he received a small annual salary of $300 from the Northern Associated Presbytery of New York for tending to the religious needs of the people in the area. He is credited with starting churches from the Pennsylvania state line, to Alden and Lancaster to the north and as far east as Olean. Rev. John Spencer died in 1826 and is buried in a part of ground contributed by him from his farm to the town of Sheridan for burial purposes.

=== The West Aurora Congregational Society ===
On August 18, 1810, under the influence of Rev. John Spencer, the West Aurora Congregational Church was organized in Griffins Mills with nine members being received into membership. Those charter members were Benjamin Enos, Laurinda Enos, Seth McKay, Clement King, Mary King, Samuel Henshaw, Betsy Henshaw, Joshua Henshaw, and Elizabeth Henshaw. On January 26, 1831, the Church was incorporated as the West Aurora Congregational Society.

=== Church building and meeting hall ===
Although the church was organized on August 18, 1810, and evidence indicates the building was erected in 1812, the oldest records which can be found go back to 1829. A dedication was planned for the Federalist style church building where early records dated August 17, 1832 state, “Resolved that our House of Worship be dedicated to Almighty God on Thursday the 23rd instant and that a protracted meeting follow the dedication.” On November 25, 1844, the Trustees voted “to purchase a Bell for the Society’s Meeting House worth from two hundred to two hundred and fifty dollars”. The bell, which remains in the steeple today, is 48 inches in diameter and made of solid cast bronze.

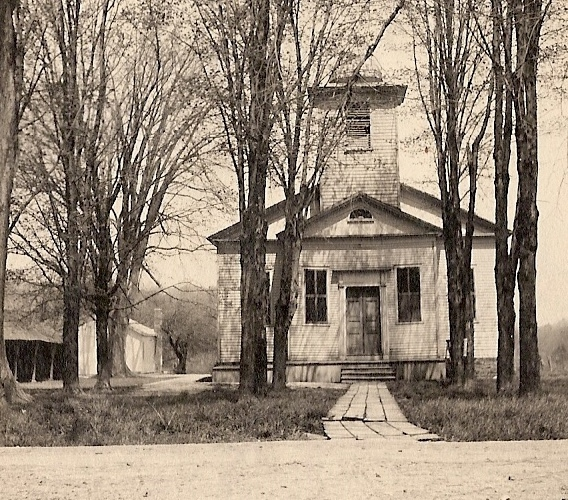
Griffins Mills Presbyterian Church in 1908 with horse stalls and schoolhouse

Jefferson Henshaw was Moderator in January 1848 when the Trustees resolved “to purchase a piece of ground, of Clement King, lying west of the meeting house for the purpose of building a Session Room and horse shed, said ground to be 116 feet long and 28 feet wide”. At a later meeting, the Trustees were “authorized to proceed to erect a Sessions room on the ground purchased”. This is also referred to as a Lecture Room and was used for the Congregational Society's annual meeting. The Trustees were also authorized “to lease to individuals the use of ground for the purpose of building Horse Sheds for the sum of two dollars on the west and north bound of Society’s ground 8 by 24 feet”.

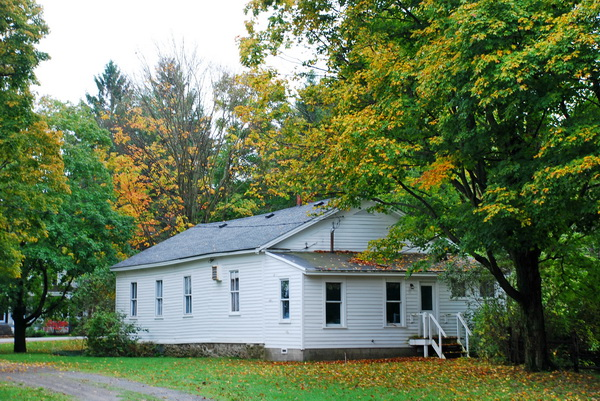
Rear view of meeting hall

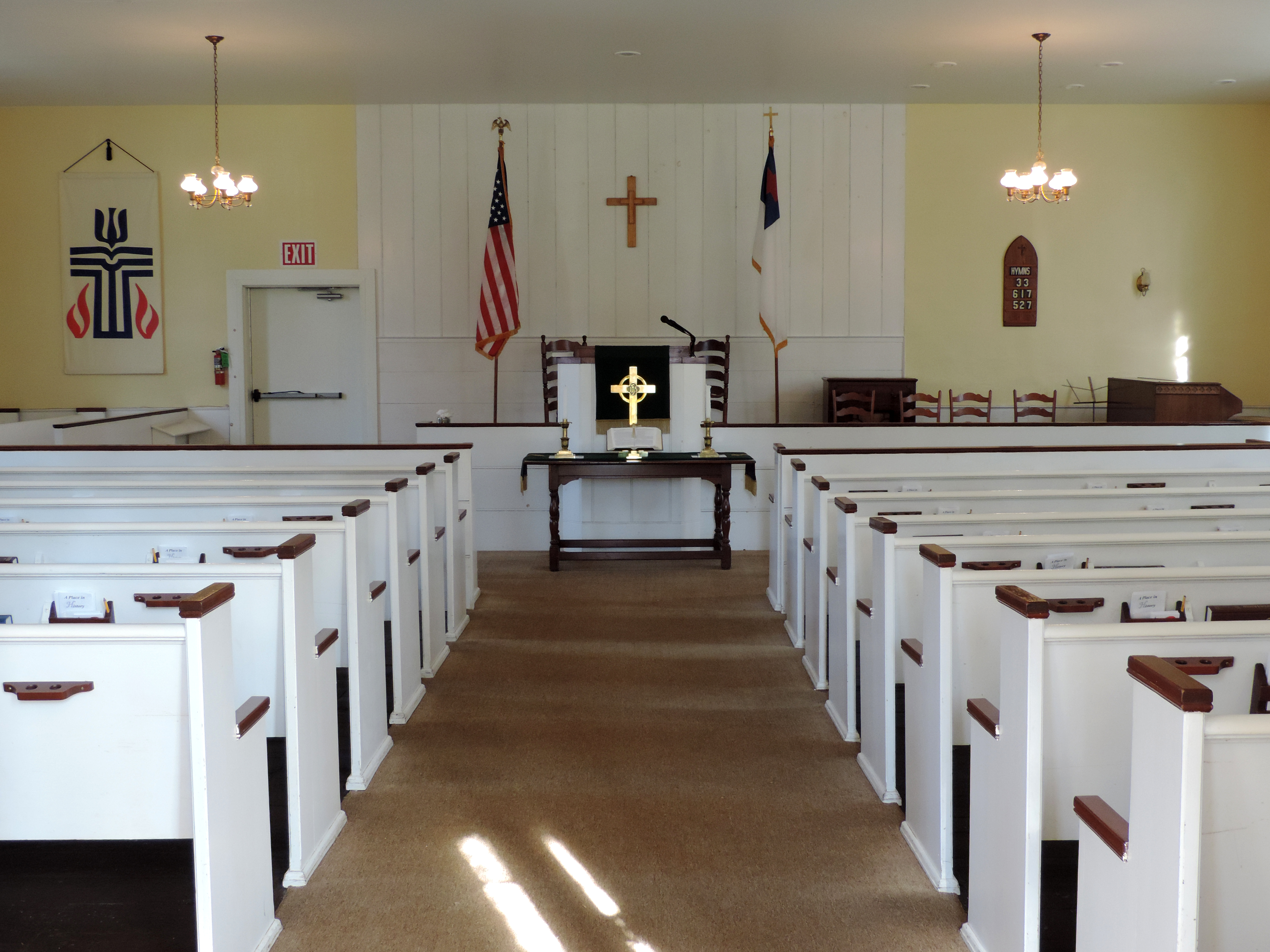
Inside view of sanctuary

The exterior of the church building has changed little through the years, but the interior has undergone repairs and changes. At first, there was a choir loft across the front reached by stairs in the vestibule. Centered in a higher ceiling hung a bronze chandelier with five or six oil lamps and on the wall at the rear of the choir were similar side lamps. Two large wood-burning stoves heated the building. There were two single doors entering the worship room that were replaced by double doors in the center because of difficulty experienced in passing through single doors with a casket. The narrow straight-backed pews have also been replaced, although two originals pews are still kept in the vestibule. Most of these updates were done in the 1940s. The present windows are original and contain handmade glass. The plank floors are original, as are the boards on the walls and the altar.

=== Anti-slavery sentiment ===
Church Records of the mid 1800s show that the Church held an authoritative rule over the moral and social life of its members – and openly influenced the larger community. The most significant topic of the time was the anti-slavery movement. With the Quakers in Orchard Park, Mennonites in the area, and other active abolitionist groups, Griffins Mills was a center of anti-slavery activity in Erie County.

The first meetings of the anti-slavery movement took place in Griffins Mills in 1834. Among the leading members were: Judge Mills of Clarence, Judge Freeman of Alden, Judge Isaac Phelps of Aurora, and Asa Warren of Eden. The following year, in September 1835, the Anti-Slavery Society of West Aurora, Erie County was organized. A constitution was drawn up containing 12 articles of rules and beliefs which 133 members signed. The first annual meeting was held the second week in October 1836 at which Isaac Phelps, Esquire, was duly elected President; Henry Moore, Vice-President; Rev. R. G. Murray, Secretary. William Lloyd Garrison was one of the founders of the American Anti-Slavery Society in New England in December 1933 that supported many local chapters.

Soon following, Isaac Phelps also served as Vice-President of the Erie County Anti-Slavery Society and was one of the leaders of the newly formed Liberty Party in Erie County. The Liberty Party was a minor political party in the 1840s that was an early advocate for the abolitionist cause. On September 5, 1844, a county mass meeting of the Liberty Party, for the nomination of party candidates, was held at Griffins Mills.

To push the cause further, at the Church monthly meeting on November 13, 1846, Rev. John Sanly opened with prayer, and Brother Joshua Phillips read the Resolutions that a committee had drawn up:

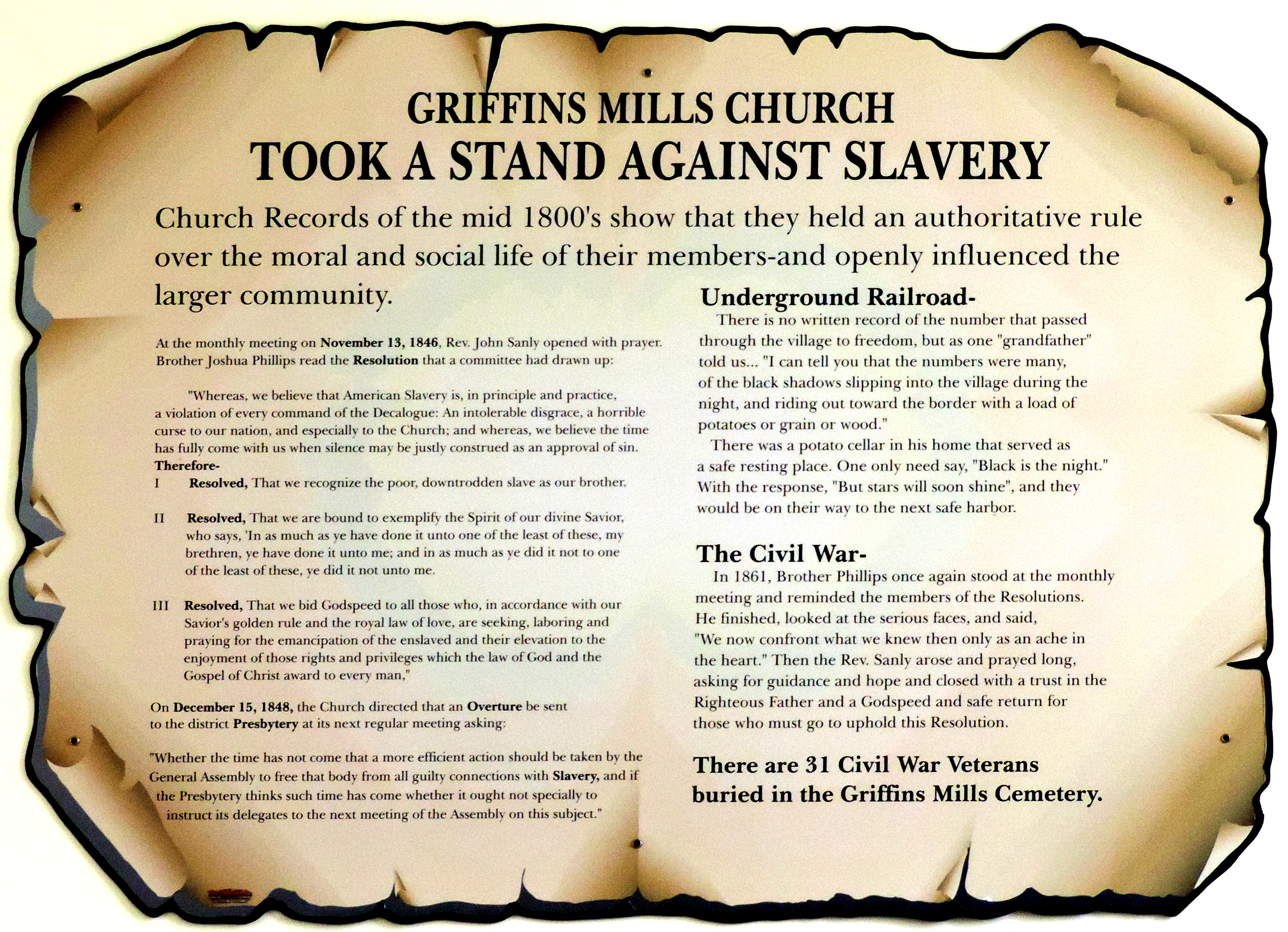
Plaque of Resolutions against Slavery

“Whereas, we believe that American Slavery is, in principle and practice, a violation of every command of the Decalogue: An intolerable disgrace, a horrible curse to our nation, and especially to the Church; and whereas, we believe the time has fully come with us when silence may be justly construed as an approval of sin.
Therefore –
I	Resolved, That we recognize the poor, downtrodden slave as our brother.
II	Resolved, That we are bound to exemplify the Spirit of our divine Savior, who says, ‘In as much as ye have done it unto one of the least of these, my brethren, ye have done it unto me; and in as much as ye did it not to one of the least of these, ye did it not unto me.
III	Resolved, That we bid Godspeed to all those who, in accordance with our Savior’s golden rule and the royal law of love, are seeking, laboring and praying for the emancipation of the enslaved and their elevation to the enjoyment of those rights and privileges which the law of God and the Gospel of Christ award to every man.”

On December 15, 1848, the Church directed that an Overture be sent to the district Presbytery at its next regular meeting asking:

“Whether the time has not come that a more efficient action should be taken by the General Assembly to free that body from all guilty connections with Slavery, and if the Presbytery thinks such time has come whether it ought not specially to instruct its delegates to the next meeting of the Assembly on this subject.”[6]

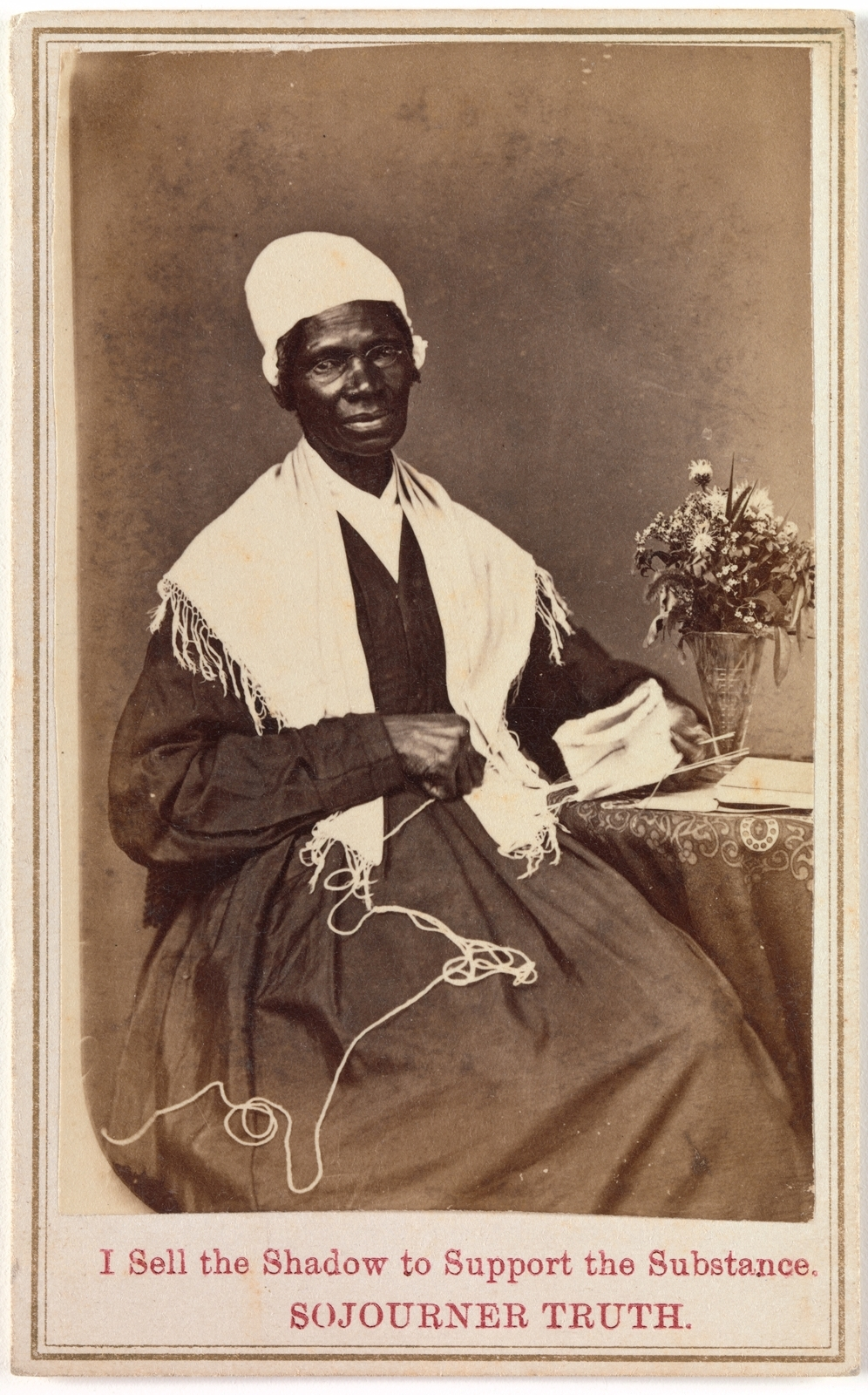
Sojourner Truth

Additional anti-slavery sentiment was evident through documented visits by Sojourner Truth, who was an African-American abolitionist and women's rights activist. Although born into slavery in Swartekill, Ulster County, New York, she escaped to freedom in 1826. While living in Massachusetts in the 1840s, she fraternized with the likes of William Lloyd Garrison, Frederick Douglass, and David Ruggles. Truth started dictating her memoirs to her friend Olive Gilbert, and in 1850 William Lloyd Garrison privately published her book, “The Narrative of Sojourner Truth: A Northern Slave”. At William Lloyd Garrison's suggestion, Truth accompanied the English abolitionist George Thompson on a lecture tour through western New York and Ohio so that she might have the opportunity to sell her book at twenty-five cents a copy. It was on this tour that she first lectured at Griffins Mills Church. Sojourner Truth visited again on October 1, 1868.

=== Griffins Mills Presbyterian Church ===
Ties to the Presbytery began as early as 1830, when Deacon Conklin was appointed as a delegate to the Buffalo Presbytery. Throughout the Sessional Records, there are yearly entries of examination and approval by the Presbytery, reports sent to Presbytery and yearly delegates appointed. As early as August 1833, the delegate was instructed “to request the Presbytery to convene at this place at their next session”. Eventually on May 1, 1907, the church was re-incorporated as Griffins Mills Presbyterian Church.
