= Griffins Mills, New York =

Griffins Mills
- Hamlet
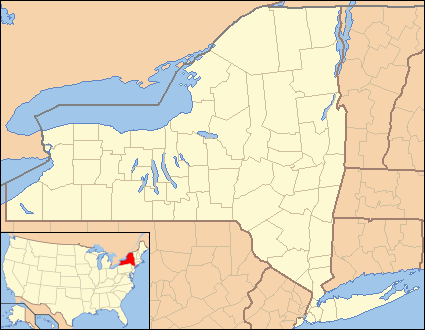
- Location within the state of New York
- Coordinates: 42°43′26″N 78°40′02″W
- Country: United States
- State: New York
- County: Erie County
- Town: Aurora
- Elevation: 932 ft (284 m)
- Time zone: UTC-5 (Eastern (EST))
  - Summer (DST): UTC-4 (EDT)
- Area code: 716
- GNIS feature ID: 951821

Griffins Mills is a hamlet in the town of Aurora in Erie County, New York, United States. It lies on the West Branch of Cazenovia Creek in the area once known as West Aurora. Griffins Mills was founded in the early 19th century at the site of a mill. It is located in zip code 14170.

== History ==
=== The Mill ===
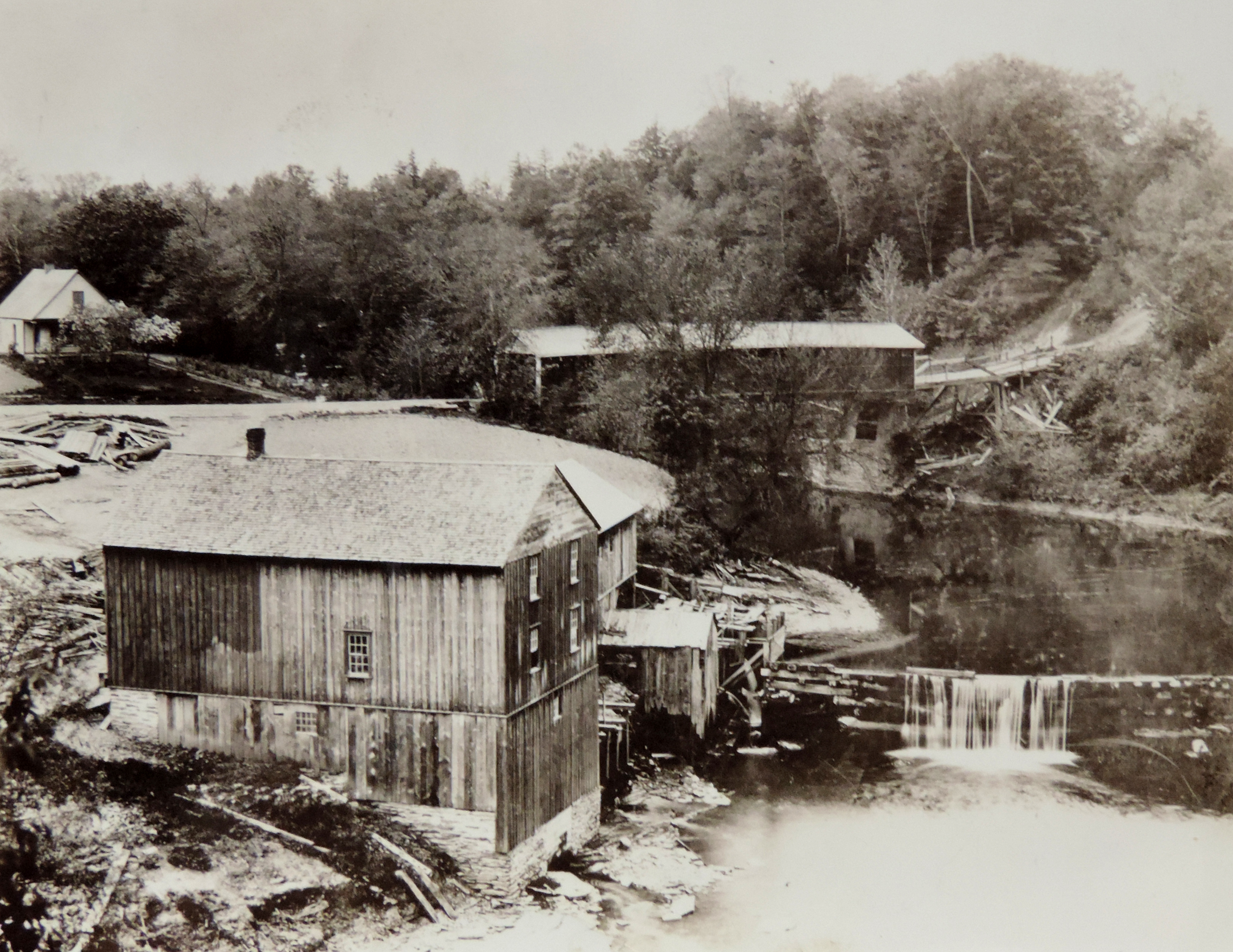
View of the mill from Cazenovia Creek showing dam and covered bridge.

Griffins Mills was originally named Smith's Mills. In 1806, Abram Smith and his son Humphrey purchased this site along with two other sites along Cazenovia Creek; one in what is now West Falls (at one time called Crockershire and later Florence) and another at the fork of the Cazenovia Creek. In 1809, Humphrey Smith had dammed Cazenovia Creek and had established a mill at this location.

Around the same time, Obadiah Griffin, who was married and had children in Dutchess County, New York during the Revolutionary War period, moved west and settled in Canada, near Welland, Ontario. He and his wife, Mary, requested membership in the nearby Pelham Quaker meeting in November 1803 and were accepted in March 1804. However, the War of 1812 prompted them to return to the United States. Obadiah and family, including sons Robert and James, left Canada during the height of the War of 1812 and sought to settle near his brother, Jonathan Griffin, in the present-day town of Orchard Park. Obadiah and Mary's Quaker membership was transferred to the local meeting by a certificate dated January 18, 1813.

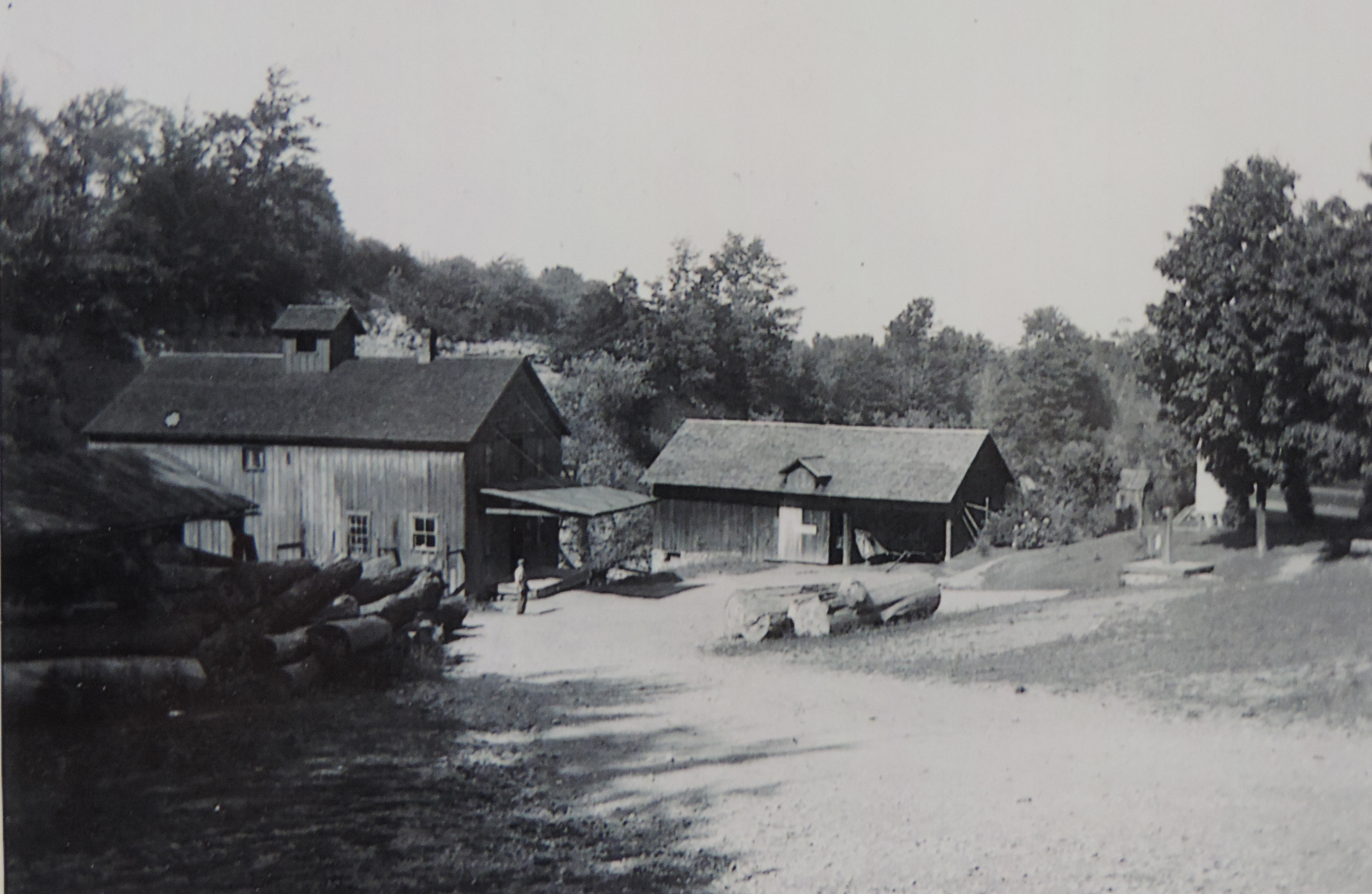
Saw mill and grist mill as viewed from Mill Road

Upon their return to New York, Obadiah and his sons purchased the mill, ultimately giving their surname to the location: Griffins Mills. They successfully operated a saw mill, grist mill, carding mill, distillery and four asheries which produced potash and lye for soap making. Multiple flumes carried the water to various operations.

Obadiah's wife died sometime prior to 1822, and in 1829 the mills were sold to Henry N. Hill. By 1831, the Griffins divested themselves of their properties and moved west to Niles, Michigan. The mills then passed from Henry Hill to Joseph Jones & Israel Smith (1833), Henry P. Darrow (1841), William H. Wing (1853), Ridley Cole (1854), William Deuel (1860), Jabez Snashell (1868), and were then acquired by Ferdinand Wanneke (1884), who came from Germany. He operated the business until 1903 when he sold to his nephews, Theodore and Frank Yaw.

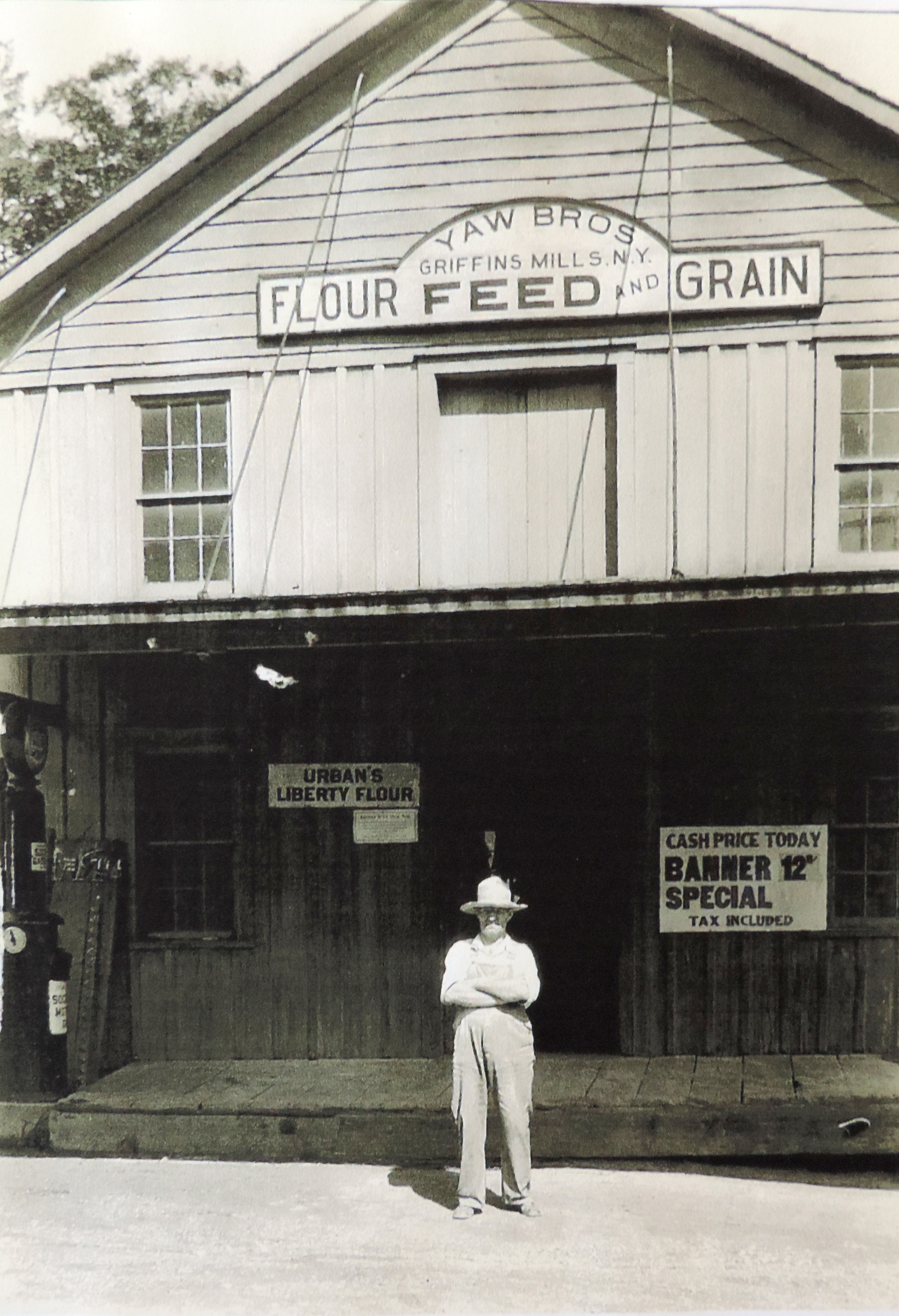
Yaw Bros. Flour, Feed & Grain Mill

The Yaw Brothers, known throughout western New York, operated the business for 56 years and were known for their accurate measurements in lumber sawing. Buckwheat flour was a specialty ground by the brothers. It was the only mill over a large area doing this type of grinding. The flour, eagerly bought for its excellent quality, was packaged in 5-, 10-, and 25-pound sacks labeled with the Yaw Brothers trademark.

Both grist and sawmills were water powered until in 1919 when a "freak flood" washed away the dam and motors were installed to replace the large waterwheel. The remodeled, original gristmill, then 137 years old, was destroyed by fire May 9, 1947. The sawmill was remodeled and utilized as a feed mill and the business continued until April 1, 1959, when it was permanently closed.

Theodore C. Yaw died March 20, 1959, and Frank H. Yaw, December 6, 1960. The mill structure in 1961 was donated to St. Paul's Lutheran Church on West Falls Road and subsequently moved there for use as a Sunday school building.

=== Churches ===
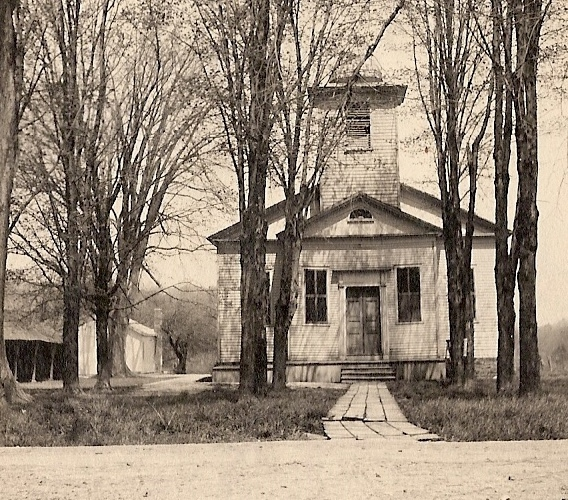
Griffins Mills Presbyterian Church in 1908 with horse stalls and schoolhouse in back

On August 18, 1810, the West Aurora Congregational Church was formed with nine members under the influence of "Father" John Spencer, a wandering evangelist. Reverend Elias Harmon was the first pastor and the nine charter members were Benjamin Enos, Laurinda Enos, Seth McKay, Clement King, Mary King, Samuel Henshaw, Betsy Henshaw, Joshua Henshaw, and Elizabeth Henshaw. It became incorporated January 26, 1831, and the current Federalist style church building was dedicated on August 17, 1832. A large 48-inch (120 cm) solid cast bronze bell for the steeple was purchased for "no more than $250" in 1844. In January 1848, land was purchased adjacent to the church to build a Session Room and horse shed. Ties to the Presbyterian Church began as early as 1830, when Deacon Conklin was appointed as a delegate to the Buffalo Presbytery. On May 5, 1907, the church was re-incorporated as Griffins Mills Presbyterian Church and is still very active today.

St. Paul's Lutheran Church was founded in 1874, with services held in private homes. Pastor Plenz served in conjunction with his work at Martin Luther Seminary in Buffalo until 1910. The church was incorporated January 27, 1892, and is still very active.

Other records of past churches include a Methodist Episcopal church that was formed in 1850. About 1868 a Baptist church was organized, but it disbanded. From 1893 to 1944, a Mennonite Meeting house was located across from the Presbyterian Church. This congregation had a close connection with the Mennonite Reformed congregation of Williamsville, which bought the building and liquidated the operation in 1944.

=== Other businesses ===
In 1813, Robert Griffin (one of the sons of Obadiah) opened a tavern in what is referred to as the Luther House (Conklin-Dyer 1825 Mill Road). The Griffin's distillery converted grains into spirited drinks and by 1820, the use of liquor was universal. A drink of milk punch or a whiskey sling was greatly appreciated in the heavily forested area where malarial fever was the common disease. At about this time, Adam Paul opened a store (Preston's – 1848 Mill Rd) and was in business for nearly 30 years. Robert Griffin opened a brick tavern before 1822, which for a time was the scene for joyful socializing in the isolated frontier community. The mail route was established through Griffins Mills in 1814 and stopovers were made at Griffin's Tavern. The tavern was torn down in 1848 to put up the Session Meeting Room for the West Aurora Congregational Church.

There were at least two tanneries in Griffins Mills. They were located near water where hemlock bark was placed in large vats to make tannic acid. Skins of animals were placed in the acid so that hair would be removed and the skin be made more pliable for leather. A pungent odor prevailed around the area where a tannery was located.

The first tannery was located on the south side of Mill Road, between Grover and West Falls Road in the center of a field. It was operated by Ledyard Phelps in 1828, the son of Judge Isaac Phelps. The driveway at 1644 Mill Road was the original tannery road, leading to the tannery mill in the field. This road connected to Olden Road and ran west to Tannery Road where Ledyard Phelp's uncle, Aaron Rumsey and sons, Dexter and Bronson, established a tannery in 1843. This tannery continued until the Civil War years when most hemlock bark was depleted.

Benjamin Enos operated a tannery and bark mill on Luther Road on the west branch of Cazenovia Creek, between Snyder and Grover Roads after 1822. The settlers were farmers, engaged in growing large amounts of cattle and swine in order to pay off their debts to the Holland Land Company. The tanneries were numerous throughout the township, since leather was used to make shoes and boots, harness, and hinges for doors. Much leather was also shipped to Montreal and other eastern markets. The Rumsey's manufactured over 300,000 hides each year in their vats.

=== Schoolhouse ===
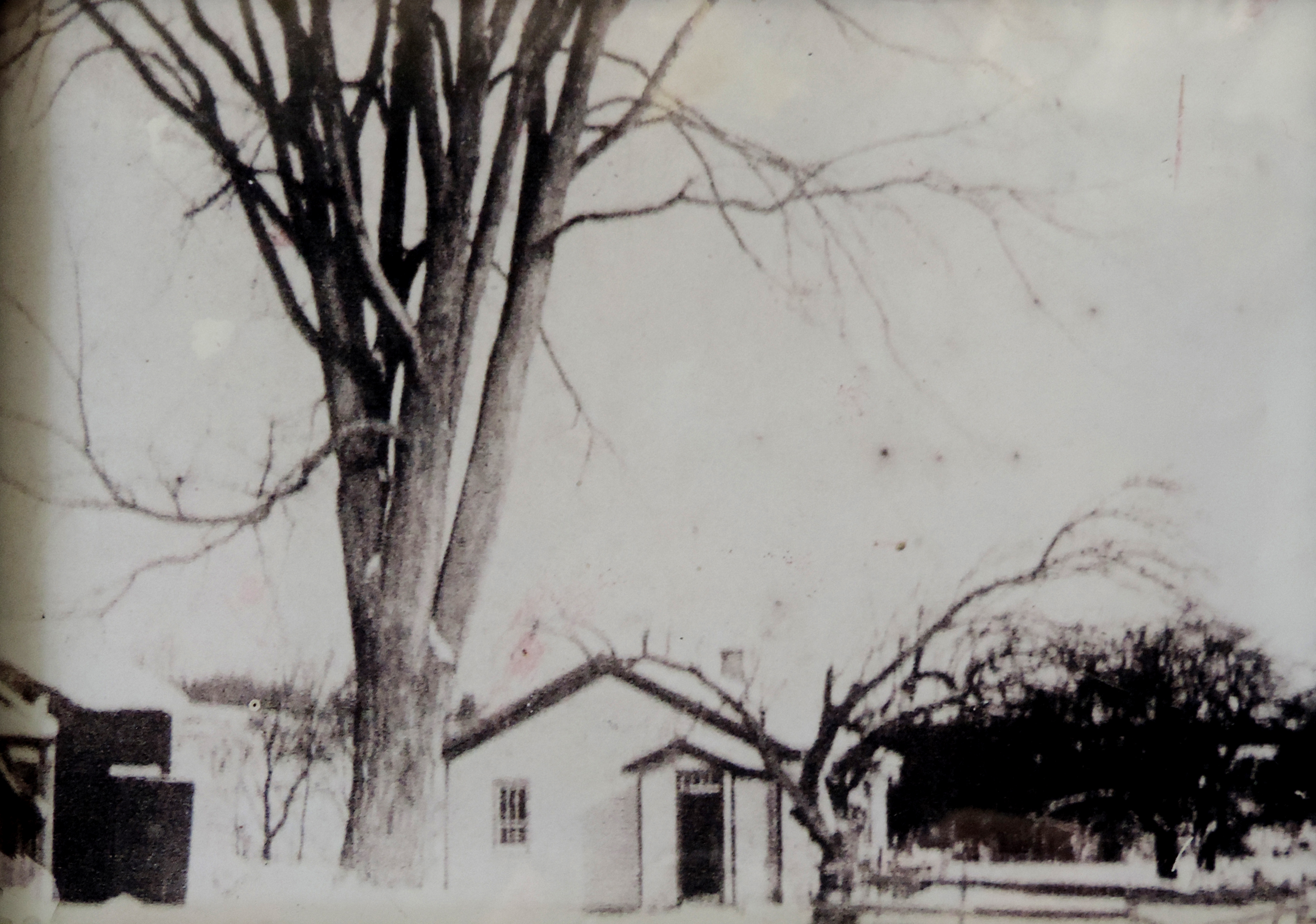
Schoolhouse behind Griffins Mills Church

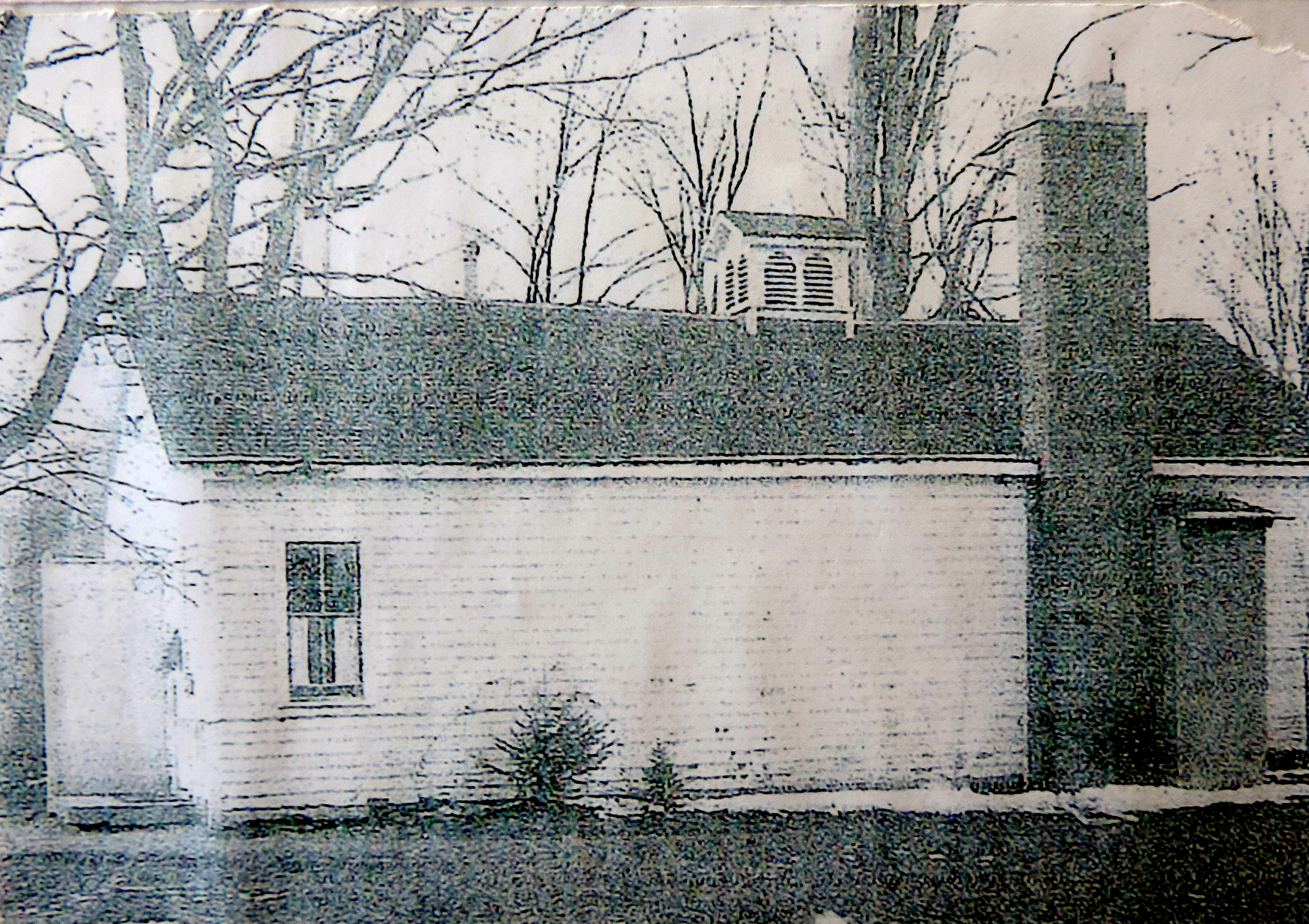
Side view of Schoolhouse

There was a schoolhouse, School #5, behind the West Aurora Congregational Church, which would have been on the original road that crossed the creek. The schoolhouse was built in the 1820s and was in operation until 1964, when students were transferred to the newly dedicated West Falls Elementary School which consolidated a few schoolhouses in the area as part of the East Aurora School District. The West Falls Elementary School on West Falls Road is now the Aurora Waldorf School. The original schoolhouse was sold to the Church for $500 on April 6, 1965, and demolished in June 1966.

=== Griffins Mills Cemetery ===
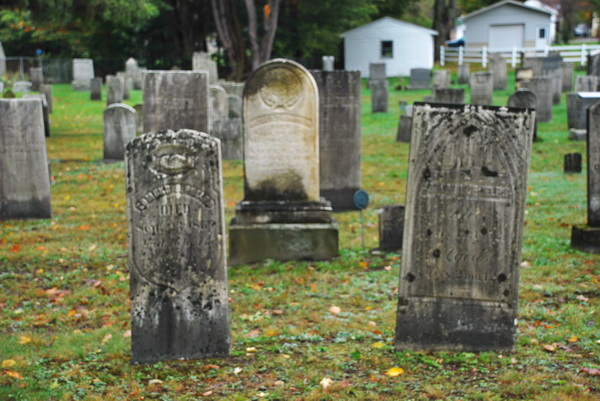
Griffins Mills Cemetery

In March 1834, the West Aurora Cemetery Society was organized with Henry L. Baker as clerk. The land was presented as a gift by Colonel Orange Train Brown. The site was an old peach orchard located on West Falls Road just south of Mill Road, now adjacent to St. Paul's Lutheran Church. Prior to this cemetery, many bodies were buried in the West Aurora Graveyard Cemetery which was established before April 5, 1829, and located in a low point near where the road forded the creek. They were subsequently moved to this new plot. Among them were five soldiers of the Revolutionary War: Thomas Treat (1758–1832), Henry Little (1758–1840), Ebenezer Patterson (1760–1844), Jebediah Darbee (1757–1828), and Clement King (1756–1828).

In addition to the veterans of the Revolutionary War, there are also many veterans of the War of 1812 and the Civil War buried in Griffins Mills Cemetery. The names of most of those buried there have been registered with the Aurora Historical Society by Craig Eckert.

=== Underground Railroad ===
There was strong anti-slavery sentiment in the Griffins Mills area. Besides the influence of the Quakers in Orchard Park, the West Aurora Congregational Church issued Anti-Slavery Resolutions at the monthly meeting on November 13, 1846. On December 15, 1848, the Church directed an Overture be sent to the district Presbytery to adopt the Resolutions.

There is no written record of the numbers that passed through the village to freedom, but Cazenovia Creek provided a discreet passage into Buffalo and local knowledge describes at least one tunnel from a house to the creek near the mill that was filled in during road construction in the early 1970s. In addition there is evidence of a "secret room" at a local residence.

=== The bridge across Cazenovia Creek ===
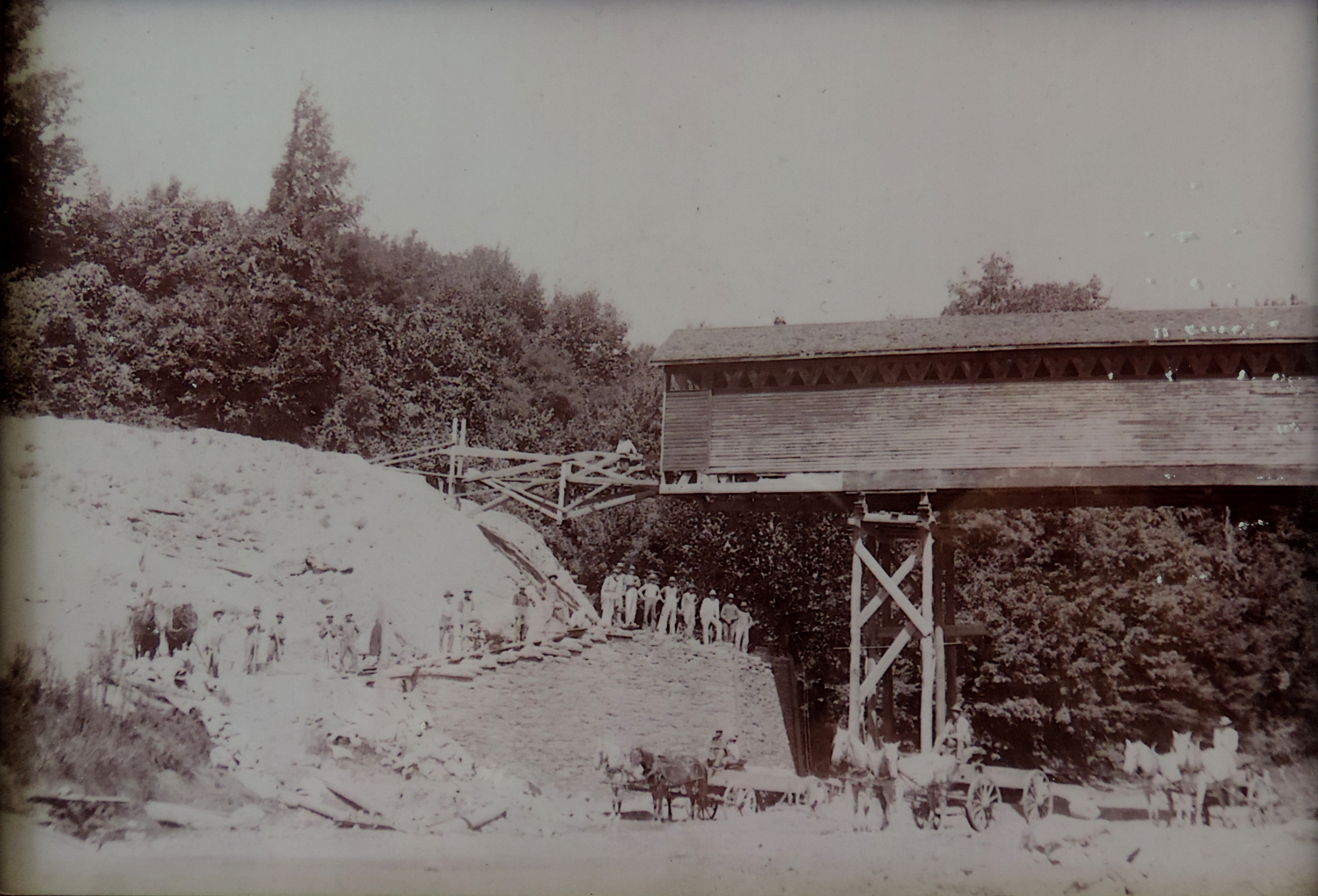
Building of wooden bridge over Cazenovia Creek

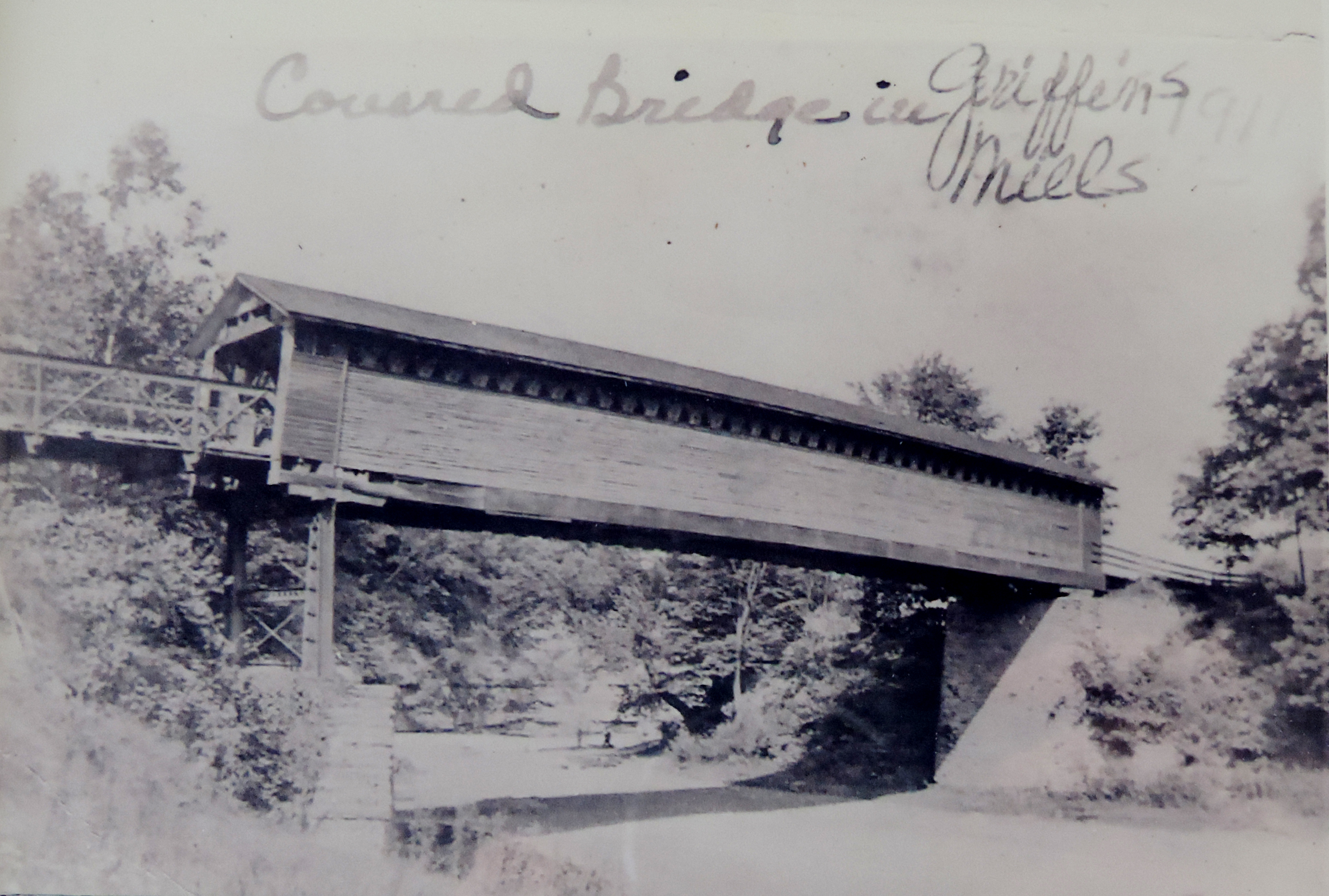
Mill Road covered bridge

Prior to 1867, Mill Road coming west from East Aurora traveled down into Griffins Mills and turned right between the Luther House and the West Aurora Congregational Church and headed to a point at Cazenovia Creek where one could ford to the other side. Once across, it is a steep, but gradual climb up to the top where the trail intersected with Luther Road and continued to Davis Road (Route 240) on what is now Short Road.

This arduous crossing of the creek was eliminated with the construction of a covered wooden bridge at the point where the road continued past the mill. The wooden bridge was replaced in 1924 by a 600-ton steel span.

== Nearby sites of interest ==
- Mill Road Scenic Overlook
- Hawk Creek Wildlife Center, Inc.
- Western New York Scenic Byway
- East Aurora

== Notable residents ==
- Obadiah Griffin
- Adam Paul
- Isaac Phelps Jr.
- Clement King
- William Conklin
