= Tony DeCorse =

Anthony Raymond DeCorse (November 16, 1922 – November 3, 2011) was an American sculptor, painter, musician, and well known entertainer in the Buffalo, New York area. His major public sculptures include the Rust Bucket monument in the Buffalo and Erie County Naval & Military Park, the Father and Son Memorial in Buffalo's Veterans Park, and the commemorative plaque in Tony Sisti Park in Buffalo. DeCorse began drawing, sculpting, and entertaining at an early age. In addition to his paintings and sculptures, he was known for his ethnic and folk music, playing the guitar, piano, and many other instruments. For his accomplishments, he was honored by Buffalo Mayor Byron W. Brown who proclaimed September 17, 2009, Tony DeCorse Day.

== Early life and education ==
DeCorse was born in Buffalo, New York on November 16, 1922. He was named Anthony Raymond, but he was best known as "Tony" DeCorse, the name he used professionally. His father, Cresenzo Raymondo di Corso, immigrated to the United States from San Marco dei Cavoti, Italy. He was an artist and sign painter. The family name was changed to DeCorse after his father's service in World War I. His mother, Theresa (née Theresa George), was a home maker. Tony DeCorse was the first of the couple's four children. He was always artistic and won prizes in school for his art. He was also musical, learning to play the guitar and piano.

In an interview regarding his service in the Merchant Marines, Tony says his father's uncle was Antoine Bourdelle, who was an artist and an assistant to François Auguste René Rodin. DeCorse started East High School, but did not graduate. Instead, he attended the Art Institute of Buffalo on Starin Avenue where he met Buffalo artists Tony Sisti, Robert Noel Blair, James J. Vullo, and William B. Rowe, whom he also modeled for. He later studied at the Clay Club (renamed the SculptureCenter in 1944) in New York City.

== 1944–1960 Merchant marines and early career ==
During the early 1940s, DeCorse worked at Bell Aircraft and Curtiss-Wright Aircraft in tool and die. He was not eligible for military service because of asthma but joined the U. S. Merchant Marines in 1944. In a 2006 interview, at the Buffalo and Erie County Historical Society, DeCorse says that he served as an assistant cook on two convoy ships in the North Atlantic, the George G. Meade and a Louis Bamberger lumber ship, and that he made four trips to Europe. He was discharged in 1945.

The experience in the Merchant Marines substantially influenced DeCorse's art, especially during the 1940s and 1950s. Paintings from this period, in dark colors with heavy lines featuring sailors and ships tossed on waves, are more realistic than his later works. However, this style and themes can be seen in his later sculptures in the Buffalo and Erie County Naval & Military Park and Veteran's Park. He had many exhibitions and briefly operated his own contemporary art gallery on Elmwood Avenue in Buffalo in 1955. The gallery's opening show exhibited paintings by Peter Busa, Robert Wiegand, Roland Wise, and Joe Orffeo, and by DeCorse himself.

In 1947 DeCorse wrote and directed the short film, Seven Beers with Wrong Woman, collaborating with Joe Offorio. The pantomime drama is based on the 1940 folk song about true love lost by Tommy Tucker. DeCorse created the papier-mâché masks worn by the characters and he also played the "Singing Waiter". Masks illustrating characters from his songs would remain a feature of DeCorse's entertaining throughout his career. During the 1940s and 1950s he played in many of the Buffalo nightclubs, such as Chez Ami and Frank's Casa Nova.

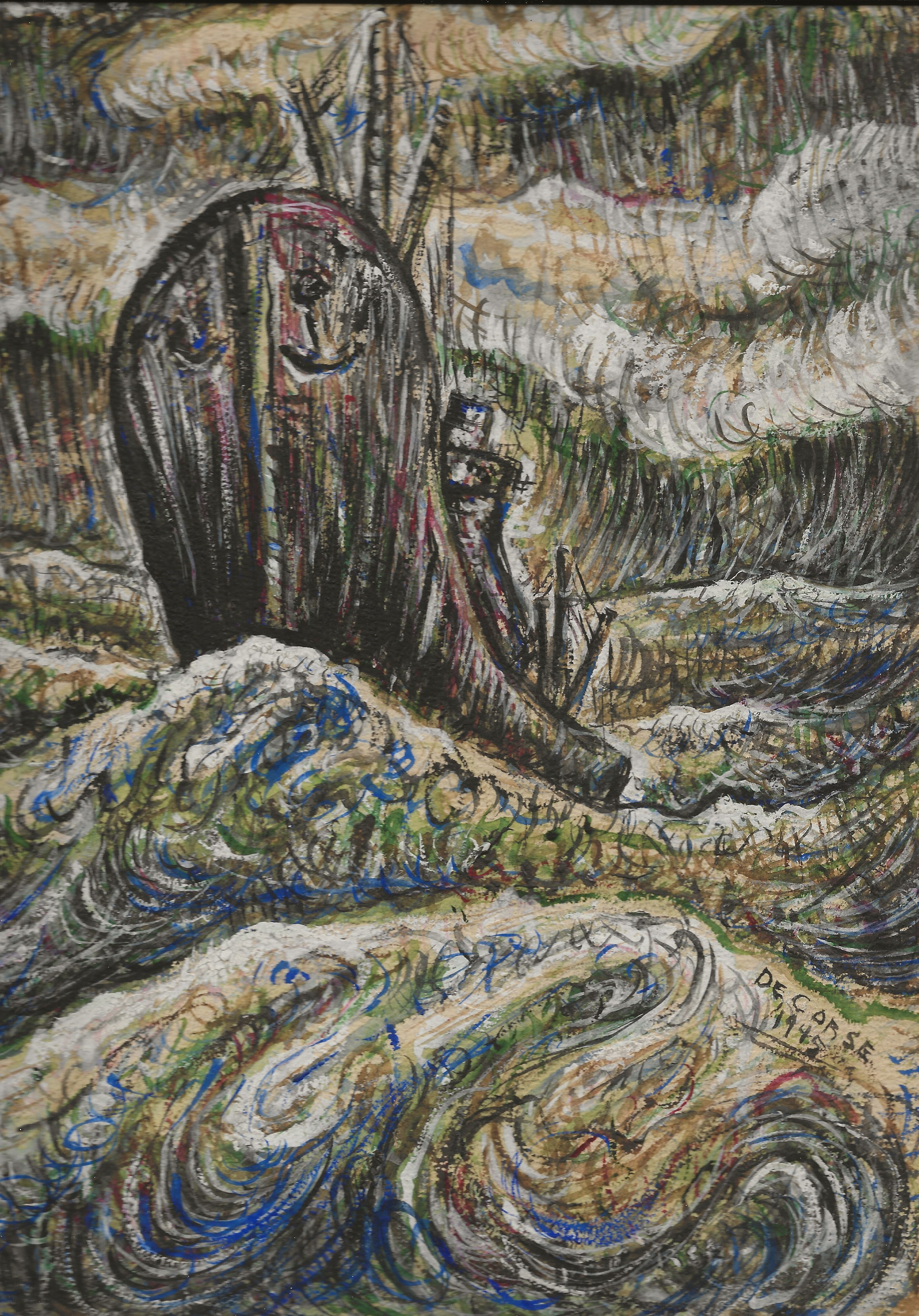
Detail of ship painting by Tony DeCorse 1945

== Later career ==
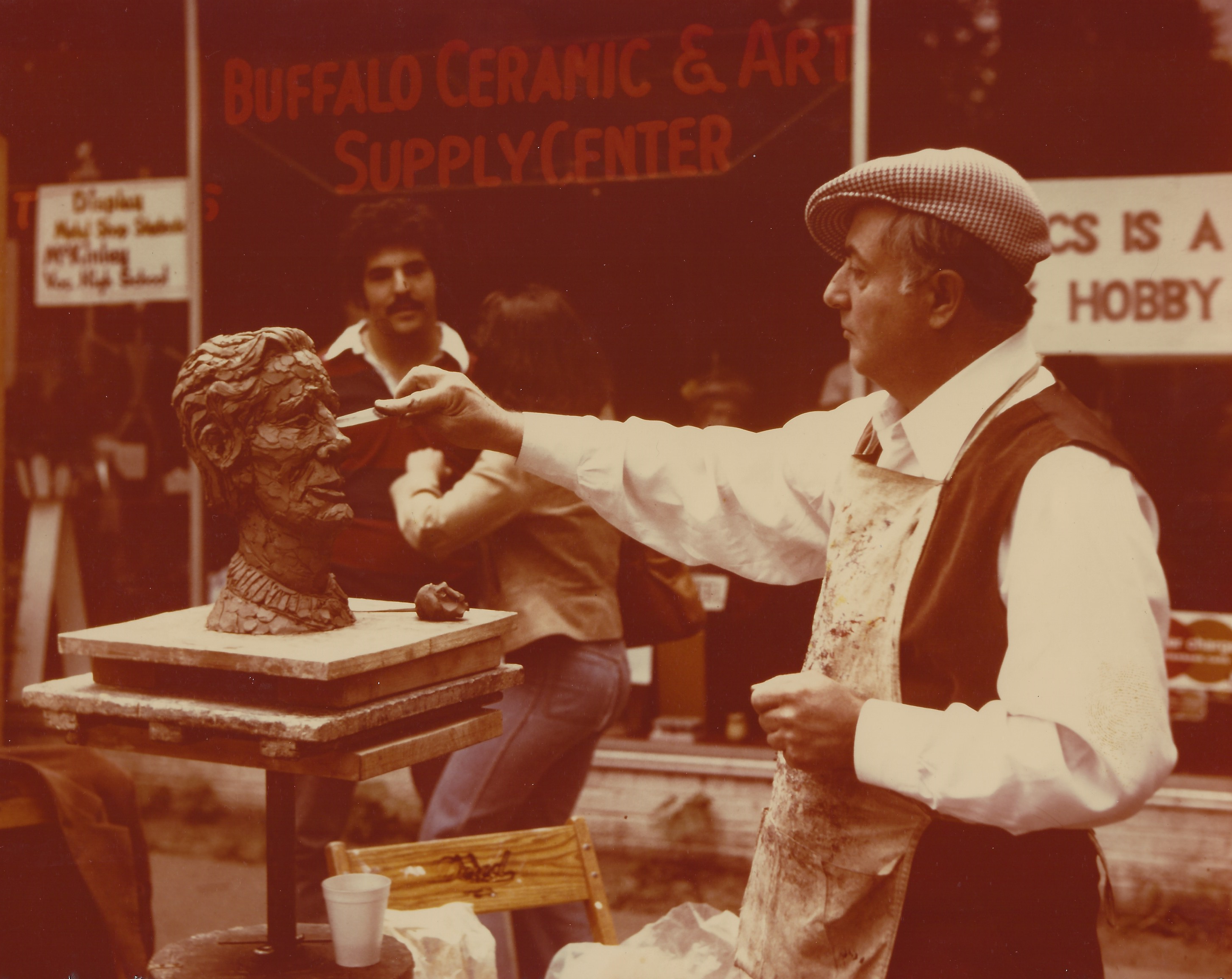
Tony DeCorse at work in 1977

Beginning in the 1960s, DeCorse's style became more abstract, which he variously described as “stylized realism” to “abstract expressionism.” His sculptures were primarily clay figures, especially busts, though he also produced some wood carvings. Starting in the 1980s and up until the time of his death, he created wooden collages and sculptures in bold colors that replicated the palette seen in his paintings of the same period. Some of his other works draw on figures from Greek and Roman mythology, and are quite fanciful including sculptures and paintings of mermaids, clowns, a purple cow Josephine, and centaurs. This fanciful bent and cubist elements also found expression in his caricatures. He widely exhibited both individually and in art shows. His 1989 exhibition "The Roaring Sixties" at the Carnegie Cultural Center featured some of his abstract paintings and sculptures from the 1960s, as well as more recent pieces.

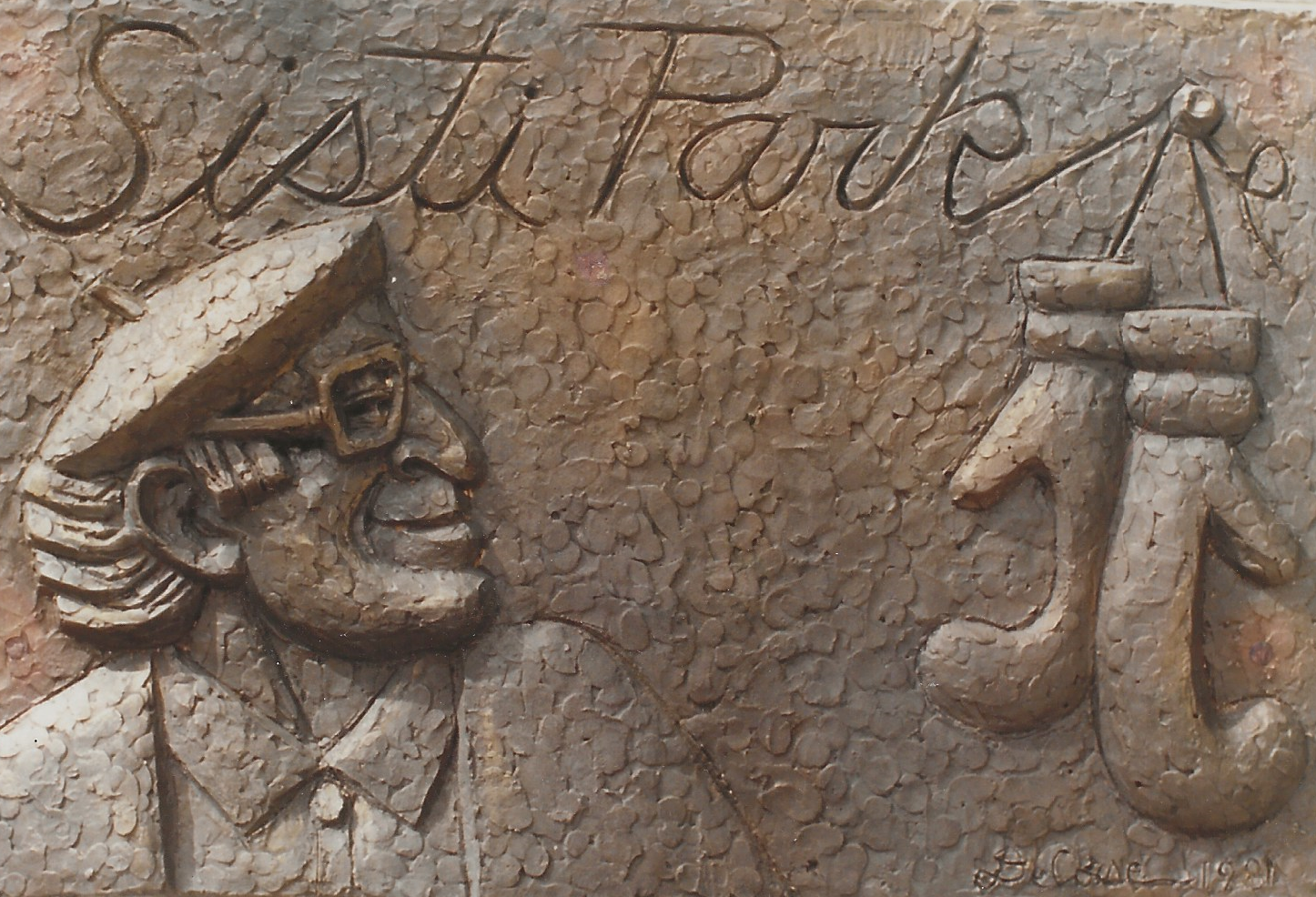
Bronze commemorative plaque in Sisti Park, Buffalo by Tony DeCorse

DeCorse produced three pieces of public art. In 1988, DeCorse sculpted the commemorative plaque for Sisti Park at North and Franklin streets in Buffalo. DeCorse had known Tony Sisti, a well-known Buffalo artist, from the Art Institute. Sisti was a boxer as a young man and the memorial plaque depicts Sisti with a pair of boxing gloves. DeCorse's Rust Bucket monument honoring area members of the merchant marine who sailed on Liberty Ships during World War II was installed in Buffalo and Erie County Naval & Military Park in 1996, and the Fathers and Sons memorial plaque in Veterans Park was dedicated in 1997. He also sketched and produced prototypes for a 40 foot long, 25 foot high, by 10 foot wide sculpture depicting the River Niagara, which he envisioned placed in the Niagara Gorge, Goat Island or the Buffalo waterfront. DeCorse said that the idea for the project first came to him in the 1930s after hearing Paul Robeson sing "Ol’ Man River". DeCorse's plans for the monument were never realized.

Although his first instruments were the guitar and piano, DeCorse would also perform at clubs using the lute, banjo, mandolin, harp, accordion, organetto and harpsichord. Although he wrote several songs he focused on ethnic music, which is featured in his album The Winds They Do Blow (Fiore Records 1976). He frequently incorporated masks and props into his performances, many of which echo his fanciful sculptures and caricatures. The most widely known of his papier-mâché works was the bison costume he created for the Buffalo Bills, which would charge along the sidelines during games in the 1970s.

DeCorse continued to paint, sculpt and entertain throughout his life. In his later years he was best known as an entertainer, the Traveling Troubadour, performing Italian, Irish, and American folk songs. He was a regular at Buffalo area events such as the Italian Heritage Festival.

== Personal life ==
He met his long-time wife and companion, Jean M. Stewart in the 1960s at Fantasy Island, where she was working as a puppeteer. Through her Enchanted Theatre Puppets she performed puppet shows throughout western New York.

== Awards and recognition ==
In 2009, DeCorse was given a key to the city and honored by Buffalo Mayor Byron W. Brown, who declared September 17, 2009 as Tony DeCorse Day. The executive proclamation honors DeCorse as an accomplished artist, sculptor, musical composer and strolling troubadour, and for his public art installations in Sisti Park, Veterans Park and the Buffalo and Erie County Naval and Military Park. He is eulogized in the poem Elegy To A Man of the Arts by Sally Cook.
