= David Foster Pratt =

American artist, art instructor and designer

- Leading member of the Art Institute of Buffalo
- Born: 11 January 1918; Ithaca, New York
- Died: 21 November 2010 (aged 92); Holland, New York
- Education: Art Institute of Buffalo
- Known for: Painting, Drawing, Sculpture, Art Education
- Movement: Modern landscape

David Foster Pratt (11 January 1918 – 21 November 2010) was an American artist, art instructor and designer. He was best known for his watercolor and oil landscapes. Pratt served as the director of the Art Institute of Buffalo in the late 1940s and early 1950s. During his tenure at the institute, he worked closely with Charles Burchfield. He lived and worked most of his life in western New York. His works have been exhibited in many northeastern and mid-west states.

== Life ==
He was born 11 January 1918 in Ithaca, New York. As a young boy, Pratt watched an artist set up his easel and begin painting the New York countryside. He was curious and stopped to talk. The artist was Carl Bredemeier. That was Pratt's introduction to art. It also began a lifelong friendship between Pratt and Bredemeier.

In 1934, Pratt began working in Bredemeier's gallery in Buffalo, New York. Pratt worked with Bredemeier as an art restorer, carver, and framer for the next fourteen years. During that time, Pratt studied with painter William B. Rowe and sculptor William Ehrich at the Art Institute of Buffalo. In 1939, he won the Best Landscape award at the Western New York Exhibition hosted by the Albright-Knox Art Gallery in Buffalo.

In 1940, Pratt enlisted in the United States Army. During World War II, Pratt was stationed in California, Hawaii, and the south Pacific. After the war, he returned to Buffalo and taught creative painting at the Art Institute of Buffalo. While a member of the Institute's faculty, Pratt assisted the well known artist Charles Burchfield, and worked closely with painter William B. Rowe. Pratt served as the Institute's director from 1949 to 1952. During his tenure at the institute, he earned a reputation as one of the best artists in western New York.

In the 1950s, Pratt began to actively exhibit his work. This expanded his following in the art world, especially in western New York and the mid-west. In 1992, Burchfield-Penney Art Center at Buffalo State College put together a special retrospective highlighting Pratt's works from 1939 to 1991. In 2007, the Burchfield Nature and Art Center Gallery in West Seneca, New York, hosted a special exhibited entitled The Vision of Watercolor with works by Pratt and three members of his family (Michael Pratt, Sarah Tobin, and Susan Rudnicky). Pratt died in Holland, New York on 21 November 2010.

== Art work ==
Pratt’s oil painting, Country House, 1939

Pratt was a painter, draftsman, designer, and art instructor. He was especially well known for his modern urban and rural landscapes. His oil painting and watercolors are very accomplished. He also did work in charcoal, conté crayon, and pencil.

Pratt's paintings and drawings present an imaginary world that is both fanciful and foreboding. He used movement and skewed perspective to dissolve images and suggest a fantasy portrayal of his subject.

Pratt won several prestigious awards including Best Landscape in Oil at the 1939 Western New York Exhibition hosted by the Albright Art Gallery and the 1941 New York State Fair Purchase Award in Syracuse, New York. He also won the Watercolor Purchase Award at the Butler Museum of American Art National Exhibition in 1954.

Pratt's paintings have been exhibited in the mid-west and throughout the northeastern United States. In addition to the Albright Art Gallery, his works have been included in major shows at the Art Institute of Chicago, the Burchfield-Penney Art Center, and the Butler Institute of American Art in Youngstown, Ohio. The Burchfield-Penney Art Center and the Butler Institute of American Art exhibit Pratt's works in their permanent collections.

== Exhibitions ==
His works have been displayed in numerous one-man gallery shows and special exhibits including:

- Twentieth Century Club in Buffalo (1940)
- Art Institute of Buffalo (1948)
- The Artist's Gallery in Buffalo (1981)
- The Barbara Schuller Gallery in Buffalo (1990)
- Anderson Gallery in Buffalo (1991)
- Pratt retrospective exhibit at the Burchfield-Penney Art Center in Buffalo (1992)
- Special exhibit, “David Pratt: A Portfolio” at the Norberg's Art Gallery in East Aurora, New York (1999)
- Rural and Urban Morphology Gallery in Buffalo (2003)
- Burchfield-Penney Art Center in Buffalo (2004)
- Richmond Memorial Library Gallery in Batavia, New York (2004)
- Watercolor Synergy GoArt Gallery in Batavia (2004)
- Norberg's Art Gallery in East Aurora (2005)
- Special exhibit, “A Life in the Arts” series at the Burchfield-Penney Art Center in Buffalo (2006)
- Special exhibit, “The Vision of Watercolor” with works by Pratt and his family at the Burchfield Nature and Art Center Gallery in West Seneca, New York (2007)
