= Mabel Conkling =

American sculptor (1871–1966)

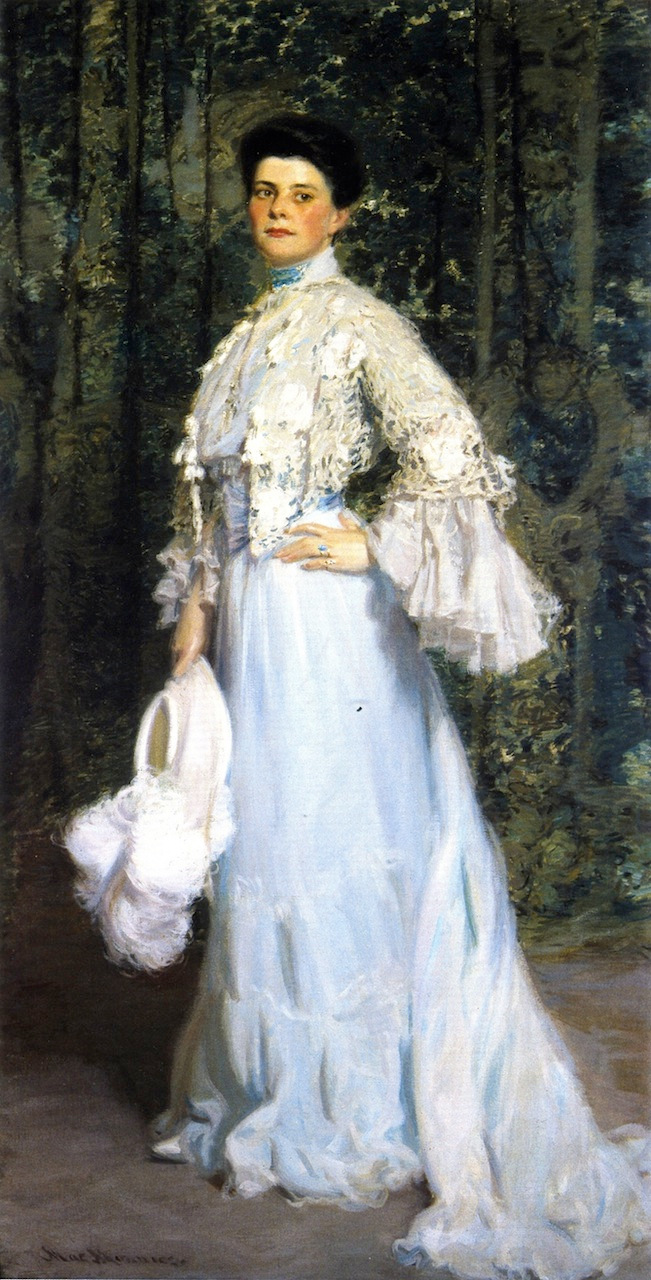
- Frederick William MacMonnies, 1904
- Born: Mabel Viola Harris; November 17, 1871; Boothbay, Maine, U.S
- Died: October 11, 1966 (aged 94); Boothbay Harbor, Maine, U.S.
- Education: Académie Julian; Académie Vitti; Académie Carmen; Académie Colarossi
- Spouse: David Paul Burleigh Conkling
- Children: 2

Mabel Harris Conkling (November 17, 1871 – October 11, 1966) was an American sculptor, and president of the National Association of Women Painters and Sculptors from 1926 to 1928.

== Early life ==
Mabel Viola Harris was born in Boothbay, Maine, the daughter of Charles Thomas Harris and Orissa Edna Preble Harris. After graduating from Boothbay Harbor High School, She studied art in Paris, at the Académie Julian, the Académie Vitti, the Académie Carmen, and the Académie Colarossi. Among her instructors were William-Adolphe Bouguereau, Raphaël Collin, Luc-Olivier Merson, and Frederick William MacMonnies. A 1904 portrait of Mabel Conkling by MacMonnies was called "the finest portrait MacMonnies has yet made."

== Career ==
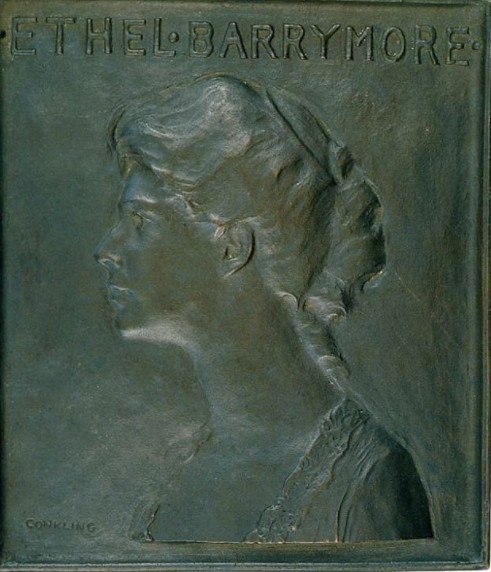
Mabel Conkling, Ethel Barrymore, bronze relief, ca. 1910, National Portrait Gallery

Mabel Harris Conkling's work was included in the 1900 Paris Exposition, the 1904 St. Louis World's Fair, the 1908 Baltimore Sculpture Exhibition, at the National Academy of Design, Harrisburg City Hall, and many other shows. She specialized in public sculptures, including fountains, relief panels, trophies, and cemetery urns. She also made portrait busts in bronze, and bas relief medallions. A bas relief bronze portrait of Ethel Barrymore, by Mabel Conkling, is in the collection of the National Portrait Gallery, Smithsonian Institution. A bronze statue by Conkling was presented to theatre professional Samuel Roxy Rothafel in 1931, and a bronze loving cup by Conkling was presented to musician Walter Damrosch in 1933, both presentations by the New York Federation of Women's Clubs.

Conkling was president of the National Association of Women Painters and Sculptors from 1926 to 1928. She was still on the board when the organization changed its name to the National Association of Women Artists in 1941. Conkling was also president of the Maine Women's Club of New York.

== Personal life ==
In 1901 Mabel Viola Harris married a fellow artist, David Paul Burleigh Conkling. They had two daughters, Pauline and Natalie. She was widowed in 1926, sold her four-story Greenwich Village residence and studio at 26 West 8th Street in 1940, and died in 1966, aged 94 years, in Boothbay Harbor, Maine.
