= William B. Rowe =

American painter

- Leading member of the Art Institute of Buffalo
- Born: 1910; Chicago, Illinois
- Died: 1955 (aged 45); Taos, New Mexico
- Known for: Painting, Drawing, Sculpture, Art Education
- Movement: Modern Realist

William Bentley Rowe (1910–1955) was an American artist and art educator who worked primarily in New York and New Mexico. He was a versatile artist who used a wide range of mediums. He also executed several large murals. Rowe was a leading member of the Art Institute of Buffalo. Other well-known members of the Institute included Charles E. Burchfield, Edwin Dickinson, David Foster Pratt, and Isaac Soyer. Rowe was instrumental in the Art Institute’s development and growth during the nineteen thirties and forties.

== Life ==
Rowe was born in Chicago, Illinois in 1910. In 1913, he moved with his family to Buffalo, New York. As a young man, he attended Cornell University where he majored in architectural and fine arts. While at Cornell, he joined Kappa Sigma fraternity in 1929. After graduating from college in 1932, he returned to Buffalo to begin his career as a professional artist.

In 1934, Rowe was commissioned to paint a 100-foot, multi-panel mural at Bennett High School in Buffalo. The project was supported by the Public Works of Art Project (PWAP). The mural, called “New World Symphony,” was completed in 1935 and depicted the folk inspiration of American music. The work helped Rowe land the commission for an even larger PWAP mural in the Nurses’ Residence of the Buffalo Marine Hospital. When finished, the second mural was called “Old Buffalo of the Elegant Eighties and Nifty Nineties” or the “Buffalo and the Gay 90’s.” These two large works helped Rowe establish his reputation as a talented young artist.

Rowe went on to become a major figure in the Buffalo art community. In 1935, he began a cooperative studio where artists could share the costs of materials and exhibitions. However, his main efforts were aimed at developing the Art Institute of Buffalo. As a member of the faculty, he taught painting, theory and art history. Rowe was a popular teacher, but he was also a demanding instructor and a very tough critic of his student’s work. Many of his peers found him hard to deal with; nevertheless, he became director of the painting department in 1938, and in 1942 became president of the Art Institute’s board of directors. He continued to serve in these posts until 1945, and remained on the faculty until 1951.

In 1945, Rowe began making regular trips to Mexico and the American southwest where he had many artist friends including Mexican muralist David Alfaro Siqueiros and Santa Fe artists Joseph Bakos and Walter Mruk. He finally settled in Taos, New Mexico in 1951, and continued to paint in the Taos area until he was murdered in 1955. Rowe was a brilliant painter and a successful art educator. His untimely death at the young age of 45 cut short a promising career.

== Art Work ==
Rowe had a vigorous realist style, but was always experimenting with new techniques and themes. In addition to his large murals, Rowe was particularly well known for landscapes. He won several painting and sculpture awards in the 1930s. For example, one of his paintings titled Pulpweed won an award at Albright–Knox Art Gallery show in 1938. After the Albright exhibit closed, the painting was toured around western New York. In addition, his works were exhibited in the 1939 New York World’s Fair and San Francisco’s Golden Gate International Exposition in 1939-1940.

Rowe’s art work is on public display and in private collections across the country. His works have been exhibited at major museums including the Corcoran Gallery in Washington D.C., the Metropolitan Museum of Art in New York City, and the Burchfield Penney Art Center in Buffalo. The Smithsonian Institution, the Rochester Memorial Art Gallery, the Albright–Knox Art Gallery, the Syracuse Museum of Fine Art, and the Burchfield-Penny Art Center are among the museums that include Rowe’s works in their permanent collections. Today, William Rowe’s works are sold in commercial art galleries primarily in New York and the American southwest and in national auctions as they become available.

Oaxaca Bandstand, 1930s

Agua Fria Mission, 1954

== Exhibits ==
During his lifetime, Rowe’s art work was displayed in a number of galleries, art competitions, museum exhibits, and special shows including:

- Architectural Competition (Seattle, Washington), 1932 (prize winner)
- Albright Art Gallery (Buffalo, New York), 1934–36
- Syracuse Museum of Fine Arts (Syracuse, New York), 1934
- Buffalo Society of Artists (Buffalo, New York), 1935 (prize winner)
- Corcoran Gallery of Art (Washington, District of Columbia), 1935
- Riverside Art Museum (Riverside, California), 1937
- Albright Art Gallery (Buffalo, New York), 1937 (prize winner)
- Great Lakes traveling exhibition, 1937
- Metropolitan Museum of Art (New York City, New York), 1938
- Albright Art Gallery (Buffalo, New York), 1938–44
- Baltimore Watercolor Club (Baltimore, Maryland), 1938
- New York World’s Fair (New York City, New York), 1939
- Golden Gate International Exposition (San Francisco, California), 1939
- Riverside Art Museum (Riverside, California), 1941
- Kansas City Art Institute (Kansas City, Missouri), 1941
- Rochester Memorial Art Gallery (Rochester, New York), 1942
- Art Institute of Buffalo (Buffalo, New York), 1951
- University Illinois art show (Urbana, Illinois), 1952
- Albuquerque gallery show (Albuquerque, New Mexico), 1952
- Albuquerque gallery show (Albuquerque, New Mexico), 1953

== Influence ==
William Rowe strongly advocated the idea of a democratic art organization. He believed an art institute should be “a school, a gallery, a meeting place for artists, art students and the public with no discrimination and no competition, encouraging maximum freedom of self-expression.” The Art Institute of Buffalo was founded in 1931, and was dedicated to the proposition that art is the province of everyone. The Art Institute was regarded by many local observers as a Bohemianism artist colony, and many artists who participated in the institute agree with that view. Without William Rowe’s dedication and drive behind it, the Art Institute of Buffalo lost its creative momentum, eventually closing in 1956.

While the Art Institute of Buffalo has passed into history, the influence of William Rowe on the Institute’s many alumni helped establish numerous successful modern artists in western New York. The Art Institute’s archives are now held by the Burchfield-Penney Art Center which is part of Buffalo State College. William Rowe’s personal papers are archived in the Albright-Knox Art Gallery library in Buffalo.
