= Ruth Erb Hoffman =

American artist

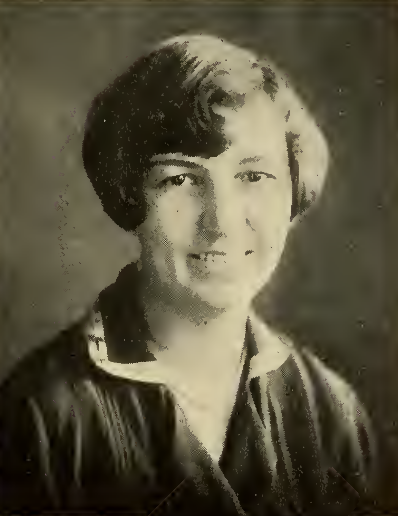
- Ruth Erb Hoffman, from the 1926 yearbook of Wellesley College
- Born: 1902; Buffalo, New York, United States
- Died: May 9, 1968 (aged 65–66); Ontario, Canada
- Occupation(s): Artist, sculptor, educator

Ruth M. Erb Hoffman (1902 – May 9, 1968) was an American artist and sculptor, based in Buffalo, New York.

== Early life and education ==
Ruth M. Erb was born in Buffalo, New York, the daughter of Lucius L. Erb and Henrietta (Hattie) Miller Erb. Her father was a real estate and insurance agent; he died in 1933.

Erb graduated from Wellesley College in 1926. She also studied at the Child-Walker School of Fine Arts and Crafts, and studied with artists Ann Brockman, Edwin Walter Dickinson, Charles E. Burchfield, and Arthur Lee.

== Career ==
Hoffman painted landscapes and still life compositions. In 1947 she had a joint show with fellow Buffalo artist Virginia Tillou, titled "Flower Variations". "Mrs. Hoffman's palette is an unusually broad one," commented a reviewer. "She is particularly adept at representing flowers within the setting of a room, arranging them in skillful reference to a pair of chairs, a windowsill with a view beyond, a porch railing." Another reviewer wrote, in 1950, that "Ruth Hoffman's landscapes have a radiance about them that could bring any dull and comfortless north room in which they were hung the brilliance of a conservatory." In 1958, she had solo show of works based on her travels in Italy. She exhibited her work at the Art Institute of Chicago, the Albright Art Gallery, the Carnegie Institute, Miami Beach Art Gallery, the Metropolitan Museum of Art, the Riverside Art Museum, the Terry Art Institute, and the Sisti Galleries.

She was an assistant art instructor at Wellesley in 1928. In Buffalo, she worked from a studio over the garage at her mother's house on Main Street. In 1933 she was one of the seven founders of the Patteran Society, a progressive artists' organization in Buffalo. "You can look at something day after day and hardly notice it until one day when the light hits it in a different way—such as when a storm comes along—and makes it very beautiful," she explained in 1965.

== Personal life and legacy ==
Ruth Erb married orthodontist Burton A. Hoffman in 1931. Her husband died in 1967, and she died in a car accident in 1968, at the age of 66, at Niagara Falls, Ontario, Canada. Her works are in the collection of the Burchfield Penney Art Center, and the Dallas Museum of Art.
