= Louise Zaring =

American painter

- Born: December 9, 1872; Cincinnati, Ohio
- Died: September 23, 1970; Broward, Florida

Louise Eleanor Bachman Zaring (December 9, 1872 – September 23, 1970) was an American Impressionist painter, noted particularly for her vivid use of color.

== Biography ==
Born in Cincinnati, Zaring moved to Evansville, Indiana at the age of nine when her father became pastor of the Evansville German Lutheran Church. She received her first education at Walters College in St. Louis, the Evansville Commercial College in Indiana, and the Art Students League of New York, where she spent a year under Frank Vincent DuMond from 1893 until 1894. Between 1894 and 1896, she studied in Paris at the Académie Colarossi and the Académie Vitti, and from 1896 to 1897 she was at the school of Harry Van Der Weyden and L. R. Garrido in the same city. Her instructors in Paris included Frederick MacMonnies, Edmond Aman-Jean, Raphaël Collin, Julien Dupré, André Castaigne, and Louis Dessar. She showed work at the Paris Salon of 1897. Zaring then returned to the United States, where she continued exhibiting widely. She had further lessons in Greencastle, Indiana, where she worked briefly with John Henry Twachtman and William Forsyth; the former would leave an influence on some of her early work, although later her paintings became broader and more painterly in nature.

In the summer of 1911, Zaring took lessons at the John Herron School of Art in Indianapolis under Forsyth. She also studied at the Cape Cod School of Art under Charles Webster Hawthorne, and in the early 1920s she attended the summer program of the Pennsylvania Academy of the Fine Arts in Chester Springs, Pennsylvania. Around 1898, she married Dr. C. T. Zaring of Greencastle, in which town she lived and worked until the late 1920s, when she moved to Florida. There she was a cofounder of the Miami Art League in 1930, at which she also taught. Other organizations to which she belonged included the National League of American Penwomen, the Provincetown Art Association, and the American Federation of Arts.

During her career, Zaring exhibited work at the St. Louis World's Fair of 1904 and in the first Hoosier Salon in 1925, at which she won a prize for Best Marine Scene. She showed work at many other exhibitions throughout the United States before dying in Broward, Florida, in 1970.
