= Art Institute of Buffalo =

Former private art school in Buffalo, New York

Coordinates: 42.9115°N 78.8768°W

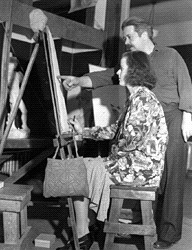
- Art Institute instructor and student, 1940
- Buffalo, New York; United States

Information
- Type: Private art school
- Established: 1931
- Closed: 1956

The Art Institute of Buffalo was an art school in Buffalo, New York. It opened its doors in 1931, and continued to produce graduates until the institute closed in 1956. The faculty included a number of well-known artists. Many students of the institute went on the successful careers as professional artists, most settling in western New York.

== Institute faculty ==
The institute had many well-known artists on the faculty, including Charles E. Burchfield, Edwin Dickinson, David Foster Pratt, Tony Sisti, Earl Stroh, Isaac Soyer, and William B. Rowe who directed the institute from 1942 until 1945.

The best known member of the institute was Charles Burchfield. By the time he joined the faculty in 1950, Burchfield was already hailed as a "distinguished American painter". While at the institute, he taught watercolor and oil painting. Burchfield had an informal teaching style, and often took his students outdoors to work from nature. Following classes, it was common for him to join students for coffee at a local restaurant. In addition to his classes, Burchfield also gave private lesson at the institute.

William Ehrich became a popular sculpture instructor by open carving demonstration at AIB after immigrating to the United States in 1929. He received the appointment as an instructor in 1933 and produced public works through his demonstration teaching at AIB such as the wooden sculpture of St. Andrew displayed at Buffalo's St. Andrew's Episcopal Church. In May, 1938, he was appointed supervisor of the Buffalo Unit of the Federal Art Project.

== History ==
The institute was founded in 1931. An agreement with the University at Buffalo's School of Education allowed students of the institute to earn credit toward a bachelor's degree in Art Education.

According to William Rowe, the Art Institute was intended to be "a school, a gallery, a meeting place for artists, art students and the public with no discrimination and no competition, encouraging maximum freedom of self-expression." The Art Institute was regarded by many observers in the Buffalo community as a Bohemian artist colony, and many Institute artists saw themselves that way.

Over the years, the institute presented many exhibits, including some for artists who were not from the region. They also scheduled art sales where the art was of both high quality and reasonably priced. In May 1937, Edwin Dickinson organized an art exhibition at which Jackson Pollock sold a work entitled Cotton Pickers. During World War II, proceeds were sometimes donated to the war effort. After the war, the Servicemen's Readjustment Act of 1944 (also known as the "G. I. Bill") bought a large influx of students to the institute. However, when the flow of veterans slowed in the mid-fifties the institute had to cut back its classes. It was closed in 1956. Today, the archives of the Art Institute of Buffalo are conserved in the Burchfield-Penney Art Center which is part of Buffalo State University.

== See also ==
- List of defunct colleges and universities in New York
