= Virginia Tillou =

American artist

- Born: Virginia Eller; September 13, 1906; Centerville, Pennsylvania, US
- Died: April 13, 1995 (aged 88); Buffalo, New York, US
- Education: Buffalo Fine Arts Academy
- Alma mater: Albright Art School
- Known for: mural paintings, abstract art, still lives, and portraits
- Spouse: Manley B Tillou

Virginia E Tillou (September 13, 1906 – April 13, 1995) was an American artist known for mural paintings, abstract art, still lives, and portraits.

== Early life and education ==
Virginia E Tillou (Virginia Eller) was born in Centerville, Pennsylvania. She was raised in Buffalo, New York. She studied the violin at the School of Fine Arts of the Buffalo Fine Arts Academy. She eventually received an art scholarship, and became a painting student. She graduated from Buffalo Fine Arts Academy in 1927. She then attended the Cape Cod School of Art in Provincetown, Massachusetts before graduating from the Albright Art School in 1929. Following her graduation she worked as a staff artist at the Buffalo Museum of Science. In the meantime she was studying painting with Edwin Dickinson and William Hekking.

== Major works and notable exhibits ==
She exhibited her still lives and portraits in the Albright Art Gallery in 1954. In 1967 she accepted a commission to make a 40 foot high mural in interior entrance of the New York State Masonic Administration Building in Utica, New York. In 1982, she had a solo exhibition of her still lived at Rutland Gallery in London, much of the show sold to European collectors. In 1985, she had a solo exhibit titled "Tabletops and Portraits" at Burchfield Penney Art Center. The show featured portraits of various Buffalo residents. Her paintings appeared in the collections of Buffalo City Hall, Graphic Controls Corp., Andre Maurois and Andy Williams.

== Work with art associations ==
Tillou was an active member of art associations. From 1981 to 1983 she was on the board of directors for the Albright-Knox Art Gallery. She was a chairwoman for Members Gallery, Women's Advisory Council and the Allentown Association. She was a member of the Friends of the School of Architecture and Environmental Design at University at Buffalo, the Main-Genesee Task Design Group for Buffalo Revitalization, Buffalo Landmark and Preservation Board and the Niagara Frontier Landmark Society. Tillou served as the president and vice president for Patteran Artists.

== Family life ==
She married Manley B. Tillou and had three sons.

== Death ==
Virginia died at the age of 89 in Buffalo General Hospital.
