= Clément Serveau =

French painter (1886–1972)

Clément-Serveau
- Henri Clément-Serveau; Musée de La Poste, Paris
- Born: Henri Clément Serveau; 29 June 1886; Paris
- Died: 8 July 1972 (aged 89); Paris
- Known for: Painting
- Notable work: A stylized pagan scene with a huntress raising her bow (1928), Fleurs et fruits, Un dimanche de pèlerinage à la Ghraïba de Djerba (Tunisie) (1953), Femmes au bain, Le Bordel
- Movement: Cubism, abstraction, Post-Cubism

Henri Clément Serveau, also known as Clément-Serveau (29 June 1886 – 8 July 1972), was a French painter, designer, engraver and illustrator. Clément-Serveau produced works in a realist manner early on, but soon became interested in the new movements. He was influenced by his friend Louis Marcoussis and experimented with Cubism, utilising geometric patterns to give the illusion of form and space. Later in his career, he turned toward abstraction with a post-cubist stance. He designed banknotes for the Banque de France, produced large murals and participated in numerous French and international exhibitions.

== Life ==
Clément-Serveau studied successively from 1904 to 1914 at the École nationale supérieure des arts décoratifs and École nationale supérieure des beaux-arts under Luc-Olivier Merson, in Paris. He began exhibiting at the 1905 Salon des Indépendants and then participated at the Salons des Artistes Français, Salon d'Automne, and Salon des Tuileries.

From 1907 to 1909, he was a soldier in the 15th Battalion in the Vosges at Remiremont. In 1913, while still at Remiremont, the 21-year-old married Yvette Hindermeyer (then 17 years of age). There, he would realize many paintings, landscapes and portraits.

Clément Serveau, 1930, Parades des Oiseaux, oil on panel, 81 x 156 cm (32 x 64 1/2 in.), signed and dated lower left

In 1919, he became art director of Ferenczi & fils (Le Livre moderne illustré publisher), where he illustrated many books (seventy-eight) using the technique of woodcut. Colette was the literary director for several years. He also participated in thirty other books and received various medals for his work: medal of honor in 1920, bronze in 1921, silver in 1926 and gold at the Salon des Artistes Français in 1929.

Thanks to his mentor, Luc-Olivier Merson, he was able to design banknotes for the Banque de France. From 1956 to 1970, he designed forty-two French and foreign postage stamps. In Paris in September 1933, he married Sara Sophie Wisoume (born in Smolensk, 1903).

After a trip to Greece in 1934, Clement Serveau devoted himself to post-cubism, participating in numerous exhibitions, including the Salon des artistes français. He became Knight of the Legion of Honour in 1936.

He also produced several murals and frescos including a three-by-six-meter painting for the lycée de Meaux, where he was once a student. He directed the l'École de fresques of l'École nationale supérieure des beaux-arts, and decorated the Pavillon du Tourisme at the 1937 Exposition Internationale des Arts et Techniques dans la Vie Moderne (Paris), now at the Pavillon de la Ville de Paris; Musées d'Art Moderne, Paris. In 1954 he realized a fresco for the Cité Ouvrière du Laboratoire Débat, Garches. He also executed mural decorations for the Plan des anciennes enceintes de Paris in the Musée Carnavalet.

He participated in numerous exhibitions in France, Sweden, London, the United States, and Canada.

Clément-Serveau died in Paris on 8 July 1972. He was buried in Bourbonne-les-Bains, where he owned a house on Rue Vellonne. A room in the local museum (Musée municipal de Bourbonne-les-Bains) is dedicated to him.

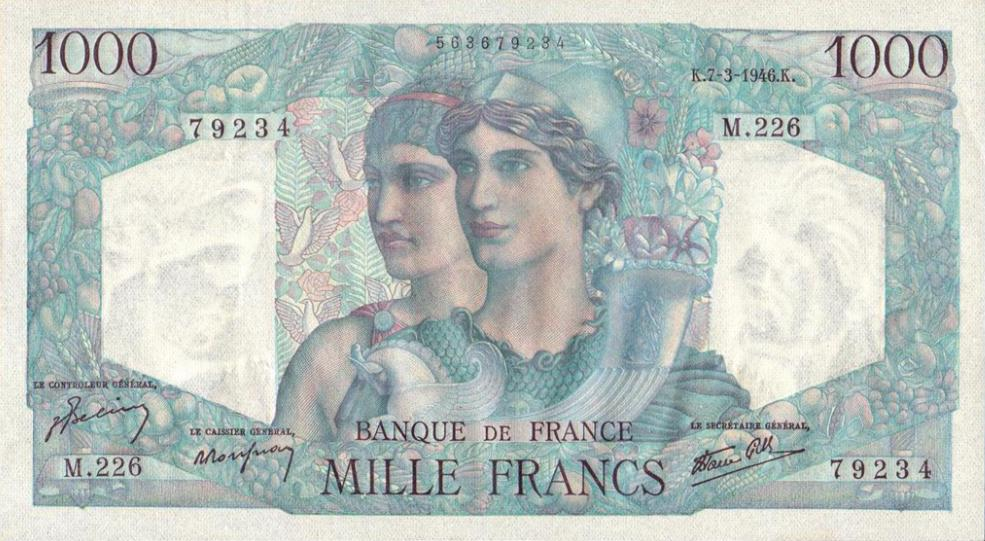
1000 francs Minerve et Hercule, Artwork Clément Serveau, engraved by André Marliat and Ernest-Pierre Deloche, France, 1945

== Examples of graphic work ==
- Banknote: 5 francs Berger
- Banknote: 300 francs, 1945
- Banknote: 1000 francs Minerve et Hercule
- Stamps: Listed in sale-date order

== Works ==
- A stylized pagan scene with a huntress raising her bow, 1928
- Parades des Oiseaux, 1930
- Anémones et pois de senteur, 1932, Musée de la Société Historique et Archéologique, Haute-Marne, Langres
- Karoti Grece, Le chemin de la Fontain (Paysage Grec), 1934, Musée des Beaux-Arts de Rouen
- Aphrodite et stellio, 1934, purchase by l'Etat Français in 1935
- Route à Chio, 1935, purchase by l'Etat Français in 1936
- Rêve, 1946, purchase in 1947 by Musée national d'Art moderne - Centre Georges Pompidou, Paris
- Un dimanche de pèlerinage à la Ghraïba de Djerba (Tunisie) , 1953
- Femmes au bain
- Déesses antiques flottant sur des nuages
- Nature morte à la table et chaises
- La Favorite, Musée d'Art Moderne de la Ville de Paris, Paris, France
