= Académie Vitti =

Former art school in Paris, France

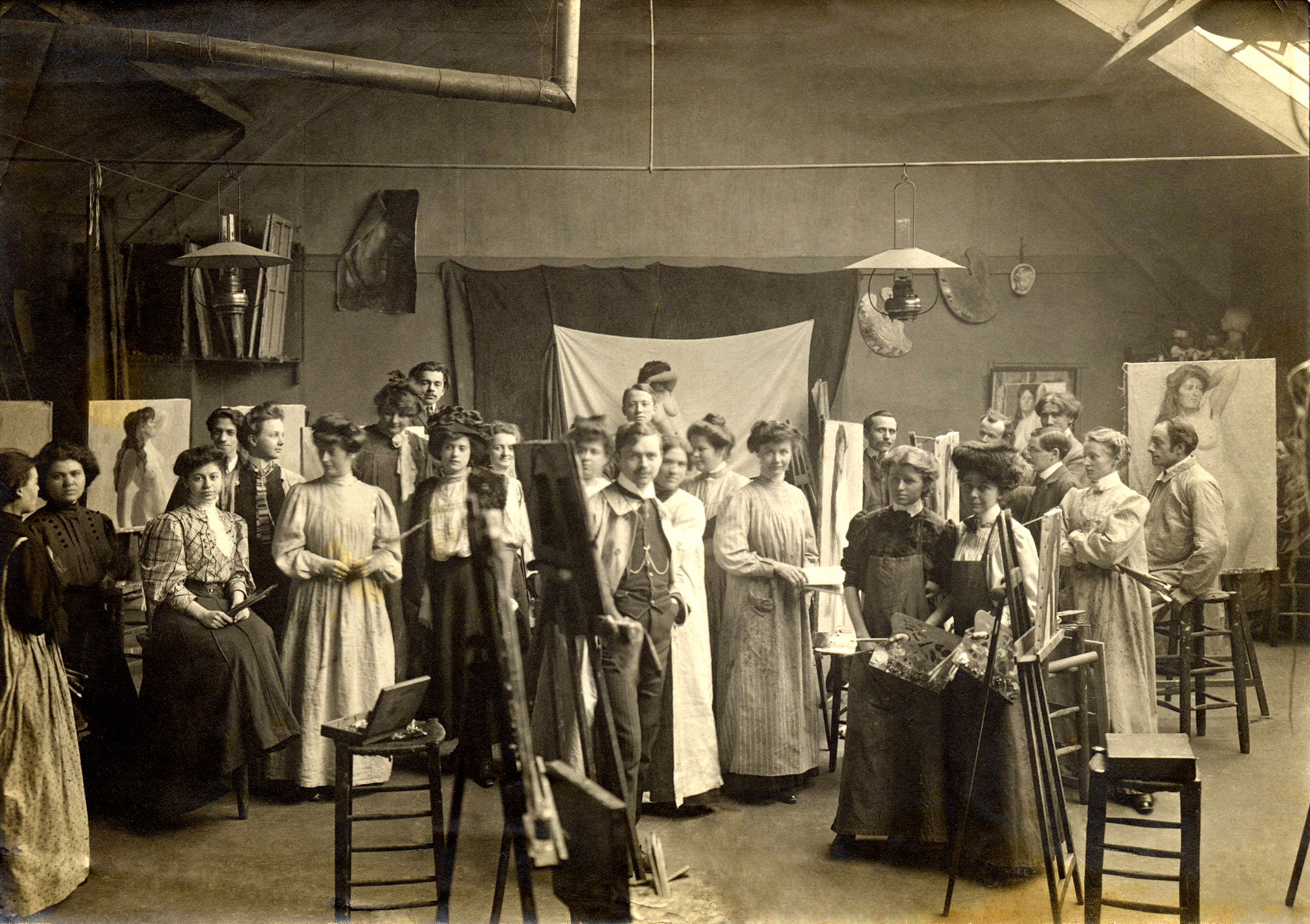
- Académie Vitti, 1900

Location
- 49, boulevard du Montparnasse, 6th arrondissement, Paris; France
- Coordinates: 48.84462°N 2.32225°E

Information
- Opened: 1889
- Closed: 1914
- Campus type: Private art school

The Académie Vitti was an art school in Paris, France. It was founded and operated by a family of Italian artists' models from the Valle di Comino to the south of Rome. The academy was progressive in its support for women artists, and gained a high reputation. Teachers included Paul Gauguin and Frederick William MacMonnies.

== History ==
The Académie Vitti, a private art school at 49, boulevard du Montparnasse, Paris was founded in 1889 by Cesare Vitti, his wife Maria Caira, and her sisters Anna Caira and Jacinta Caira. Cesare Vitti came from Casalvieri, a village in the Valle di Comino close to Atina in the mountains south of Rome. He began as an artist's model, then became a painter and sculptor himself. The three Caira sisters, their cousin Carmela and their brother Antonio came from nearby Gallinaro. They moved to Paris and worked as models for painters, sculptors and photographers.

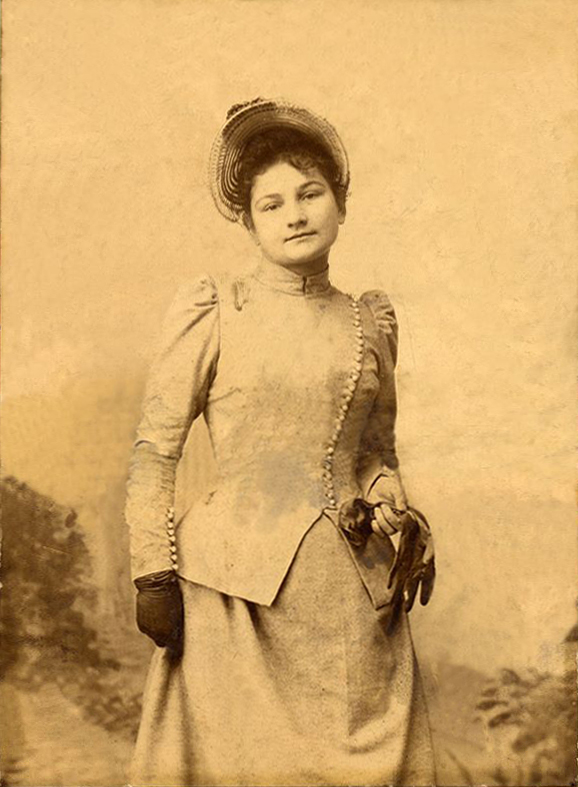
Maria Caira

Antonio Caira posed as a blacksmith for the French 100 franc banknote drawn by Luc-Olivier Merson (1846–1920). Maria Caira was in great demand as a model due to her "perfect" body. She posed for the American Frederick William MacMonnies (1863–1937) for his sculpture of Diana the Huntress. Carmela Caira posed for James Abbott McNeill Whistler (1834–1903), Henri Matisse (1869–1954), Émile Bernard (1868–1941) and Alice Pike Barney (1857–1931).

The Académie Vitti was one of the first to accept female students, and to allow women to sketch nude male models. It became highly respected. The Caira-Vitti family returned to Italy just before the outbreak of World War I (1914–18), taking many works and memorabilia from the academy.

== Museum ==
Cesare Erario, a descendant of the family, inherited the house that the family occupied in Atina after their return. He found the collection of objects from the academy in the attic, researched the academy, and in 2013 opened the house as a museum to exhibit the collection. The display includes some paintings, many sketches in charcoal, chalk and pencil, including some of Jacinta Caira's paintings and drawings. It also includes many costume photographs and postcards by photographers such as Nadar. Photographs of the family and the academy give a view of life in private art schools of the period.

== Teachers ==
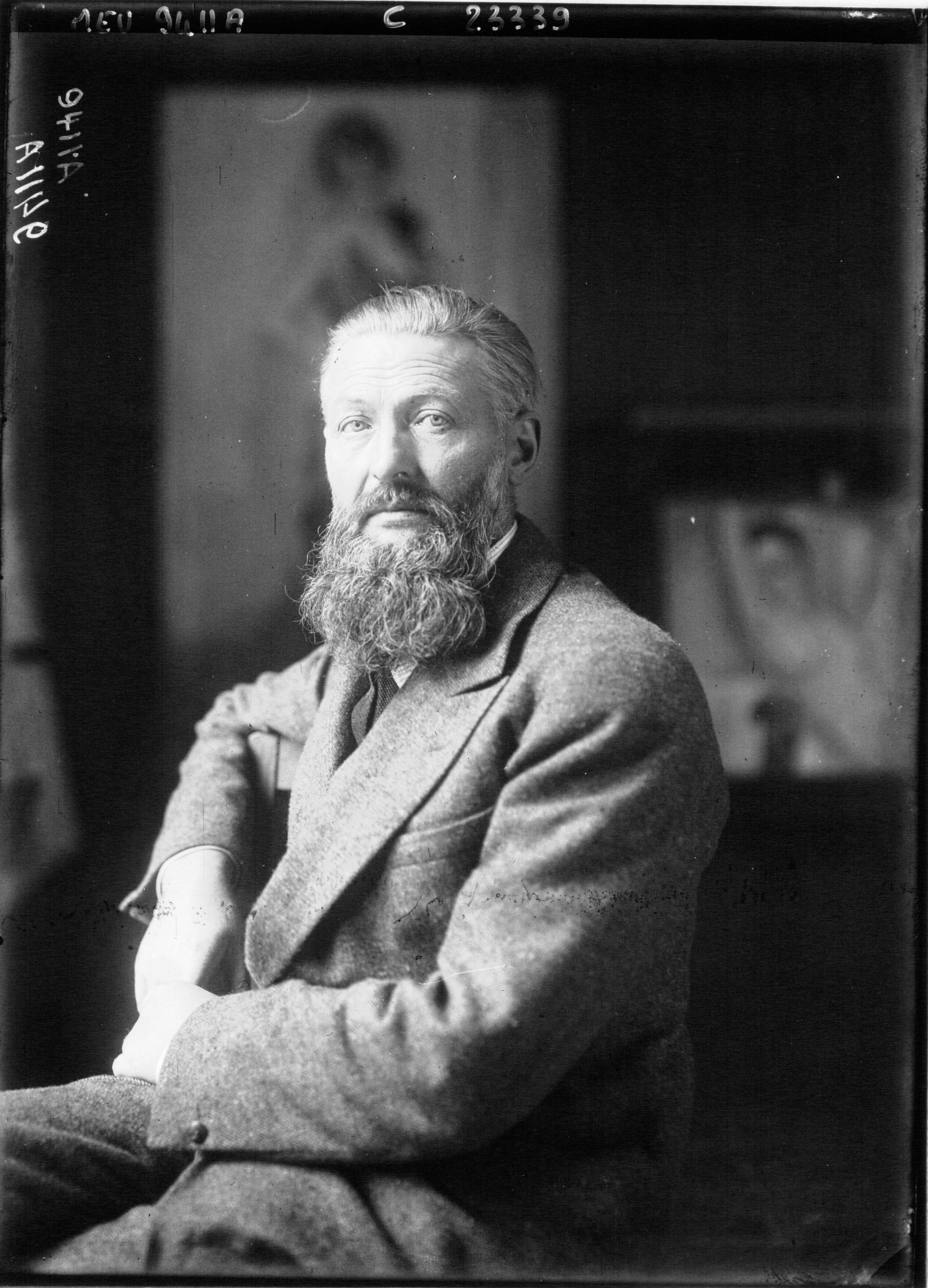
Kees van Dongen in 1923

Teachers included Paul Gauguin (1848–1903), Luc-Olivier Merson, Frederick MacMonnies, Jacques-Émile Blanche (1861–1942) and Hermenegildo Anglada Camarasa (1871–1959). In March 1903 Walter Sickert (1860–1942) began teaching again in Paris, probably at the Académie Vitti with Blanche and Lucien Simon (1861–1945). Kees van Dongen (1877–1968) influenced many of his female students at the academy with an interest in fauvism. He showed artists such as Tyko Sallinen (1879–1955) and Ragnhild Kaarbø (1889–1949) a direction that would lead to Nordic expressionism. Other teachers at the academy were Paul Gervais (1859–1934) and, as an assistant, María Blanchard (1871–1959). Maria Blanchard studied at the academy under Kees van Dongen and Hermén Anglada Camarasa.

== Students ==
The Académie Vitti attracted art students from many countries, including:

- Konstanty Brandel (1880–1970), Poland
- Colin Campbell Cooper (1856–1937), US
- Alson S. Clark (1876–1949)
- Mabel Conkling (1871–1966), US
- Charles Ginner (1878–1952), England
- Aleksandr Golovin (1863–1930), Russia
- Abbott Fuller Graves (1859–1936), US
- Pekka Halonen (1865–1933), Finland
- Mary Riter Hamilton (1873–1954), Canada
- Elizaveta Kruglikova (1865–1941), Russia
- Janet Scudder (1869–1940), US
- David Shterenberg (1881–1948), Russia
- Ada Walter Shulz (1870–1928), US
- Claire Shuttleworth (1867–1930), US
- Enid Yandell (1869–1934), US
- Louise Zaring (1872–1970), US

== Sources ==
- Baron, Wendy; Sickert, Walter (2006), Sickert: Paintings and Drawings, Yale University Press, ISBN 0-300-11129-0
- Claustrat, Frank (2012), "Nordic Writers and Artists in Paris", A Cultural History of the Avant-Garde in the Nordic Countries 1900–1925, Rodopi, ISBN 978-94-012-0891-8
- Gaze, Delia (1997), Dictionary of Women Artists: Artists, J-Z, Taylor & Francis, ISBN 978-1-884964-21-3
- "Museo Académie Vitti", Trecanni
- Shapcott, Louise, Museum of the Académie Vitti
- "Vitti, ??-??", The Correspondence of James McNeill Whistler, University of Glasgow
