= Boothbay Region High School =

Location
- 236 Townsend Avenue; Boothbay Harbor, Maine 04538; United States; 43.86441°N 69.62944°W

Information
- Former name: Boothbay Harbor High School (1874-1956)
- Type: Public high school
- Motto: Proud of the past, working on the future
- Established: 1874; 152 years ago
- School district: Boothbay-Boothbay Hbr CSD
- Superintendent: Robert Kahler
- Principal: Tricia Campbell
- Teaching staff: 19.50 (FTE)
- Grades: 9-12
- Enrollment: 171 (2023–2024)
- Student to teacher ratio: 8.77
- Campus size: 14 acres
- Campus type: Rural
- Colors: Royal blue and gold
- Athletics conference: Mountain Valley Conference
- Mascot: Seahawk
- Nickname: Seahawks
- Rival: Wiscasset High School
- Yearbook: The Log
- Communities served: Boothbay, Boothbay Harbor
- Website: brhs.aos98.net

Boothbay Region High School (Boothbay or BRHS) is a public high school in Boothbay Harbor, Maine, serving the towns of Boothbay and Boothbay Harbor. The school is open to students from neighboring towns, primarily Edgecomb and Southport.

== History ==
In 1874 there was a union of two districts in Boothbay and the following year a high school was built. Originally called Boothbay Harbor High School, it was renamed after its relocation, when it became the local high school for the other neighboring towns of the Boothbay region. There were three rooms and the grades were: primary, intermediate, and grammar. The building was first used for the winter terms after being dedicated with appropriate ceremonies.

The grade school building at Boothbay Center was built in 1877, the grades being grammar and primary. As in the other cases the first schools were taught in the winter following erection.

Two terms of school, with an average length of ten weeks, were taught. Average wages per week in summer were $4.70; average wages per month in winter were $36.70; and the total school fund in 1880 was $4959.73. The first public graduation exercises held in either town were in 1893 by the graduating class from the Boothbay Harbor High School. In 1893, the grades in the village schools was systematically established, allotting for each room the work for two years in each grade before the high school, and this included a regular college preparatory course. The course of study was printed, framed and hung in each room throughout the school. Since that date (1893) public graduations have regularly occurred and the course, from primary up, has been maintained with few variations from the form then established. In later years, The Grand March became a Boothbay Region tradition, the first one being held in 1911 at the Pythian Opera House.

The current high school building was constructed in 1956. Due to the disrepair and aging of the high school building and failing to meet modern state standards, the school district created a plan to teardown the existing high school and replace it with a new building.

== Academics ==
Boothbay offers over 75 courses, including 6 advanced placement (AP) courses. In 2018, 85% of students taking AP exams scored a 3 or higher. Graduating students have had a college acceptance rate averaging 84% over the past three years. The Class of 2021 had a 100% graduation rate. The school has dual enrollment agreements with both the University of Southern Maine and the University of Maine at Fort Kent. In 2015, U.S. News & World Report reported BRHS as among the nation's best public schools.

BRHS has STEM offerings in Engineering, Advanced Robotics, Making and Marketing, Meteorology, and Marine Science. Humanities classes include Arts, Music, Social Sciences, Foreign Languages, and English Language Arts, as well as elective course opportunities for classes such as Recent History and Literature, Sculpture, AP Psychology, Financial Literacy, Power of Film, and Religions of Man.

The school has extracurricular activities including a Math Team, Performing Arts, Student Council, the Student Health Advisory Board, Robotics, and a Pep Band. The Robotics Team were 2018 State runner-ups, and the Math Team placed first in both 2021 and 2022 for the Southern Maine Small Schools category.

== Athletics ==
Boothbay's mascot, the Seahawk

Due to declining enrollment and student participation, Boothbay has combined certain sports teams with Wiscasset High School and Morse High School. Boothbay-Wiscasset teams are nicknamed the "Seawolves", a combination of Boothbay's Seahawk and Wiscasset's Wolverine. Boothbay-Wiscasset's colors are blue and red.

Boothbay offers varsity sports teams, including Baseball, Basketball, Cheerleading, Cross country, Field hockey, Football, Lacrosse (at Morse for Boys'), Sailing, Soccer (at Wiscasset), Softball (at Wiscasset), Swimming (at Wiscasset), Track and field (outdoor at Wiscasset), and Tennis.

BRHS is a member of the Mountain Valley Conference and has won several State Championships.

- Boys' Basketball - (Class C) 2001
- Girls' Basketball - (Class C) 1984, 2019
- Boys' Cross Country - (Class C) 2009, 2013
- Football - (Class D) 1958, 1973, 1975, (Class C) 2001, 2002, (Class E) 2017
- Girls' Outdoor Track & Field - (Class C) 1988, 1990

== Notable alumni ==
- Mabel Conkling, sculptor
- Matthew Forgues, racewalker
- Tim Sample, humorist
- Holly Stover, politician
- Stanley R. Tupper, U.S. Representative
