= María Blanchard =

Spanish artist (1881–1932)

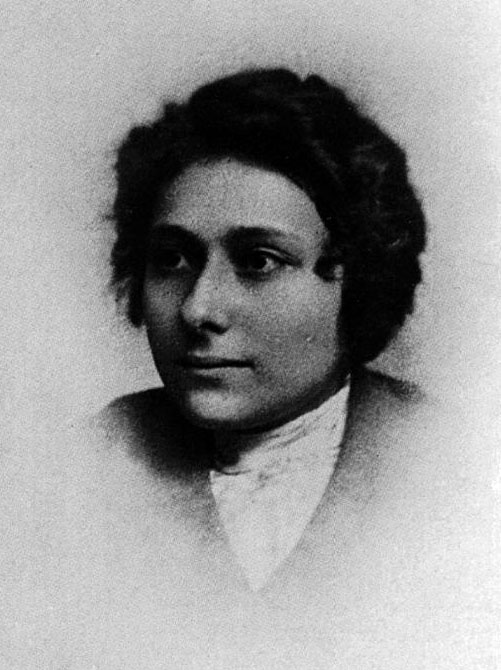
- Blanchard in 1909
- Born: María Gutiérrez-Cueto y Blanchard; 6 March 1881; Santander, Spain
- Died: 5 April 1932 (aged 51); Paris, France
- Education: Real Academia de Bellas Artes de San Fernando; Académie Vitti
- Style: Cubism

María Gutiérrez-Cueto y Blanchard (6 March 1881 – 5 April 1932) was a Spanish painter. She was known for developing a unique style of Cubism.

== Biography ==
Blanchard was born on 6 March 1881 in Santander, Spain. She was the daughter of journalist Enrique Gutiérrez Cueto and Concepción Blanchard Santisteban. She was the cousin of Mexican artist Germán Cueto and Spanish writer and socialist Matilde de la Torre.

She was born with several physical deformities, including a deformed spine, which some attributed to Blanchard's mother's fall during her pregnancy. Blanchard was born with kyphoscoliosis and bilateral hip disarticulation. Her growth was stunted and she walked with a limp, causing her to be teased at school and nicknamed "the witch". The emotional pain this caused can be seen in many of her artworks' themes. Blanchard turned to painting to express her sadness. Her father was a large influence in her life, encouraging her to draw.

Maternity (1921)

In 1903, she moved to Madrid and studied at the Real Academia de Bellas Artes de San Fernando under Spanish artists such as Emilio Sala and Manuel Benedito. Sala taught Blanchard "precision" and the "exuberant use of colour," which would feature in her early compositions. In 1908, after Blanchard won a third prize for her painting Primeros pasos at the National Exhibition of Fine Arts, the Santander government awarded her a grant to support her education in the arts. In 1909, this grant allowed her to continue her artistic education at the Académie Vitti in Paris under Hermenegildo Anglada Camarasa and Kees van Dongen. Here she discovered cubist painting, and was influenced by Jacques Lipchitz and Juan Gris. In 1914, due to World War I, Blanchard left Paris and returned to Madrid. She shared a studio in her mother's house with some of the artists she met in Paris. In 1915, her art was displayed in an exhibition organized by Ramón Gómez de la Serna at the Museo de Arte Moderno (Madrid). She was contacted to teach art in Salamanca (Madrid), but was disappointed by the experience.

In 1916, before the end of the war, Blanchard moved to Paris, where she would spend the rest of her life. There, she met many Cubist artists and began developing her own style of Cubism. She became close friends with Juan Gris, a Spanish Cubist painter, who heavily influenced her work. Blanchard joined the Section d'Or, a Cubist art group Early paintings, such as Woman With a Fan, show flat, interlocked shapes. Her style evolved to become more figurative and traditional over the years; her paintings became harsh, with bright clashing colors and melancholic themes. The resulting artwork was very emotionally expressive.

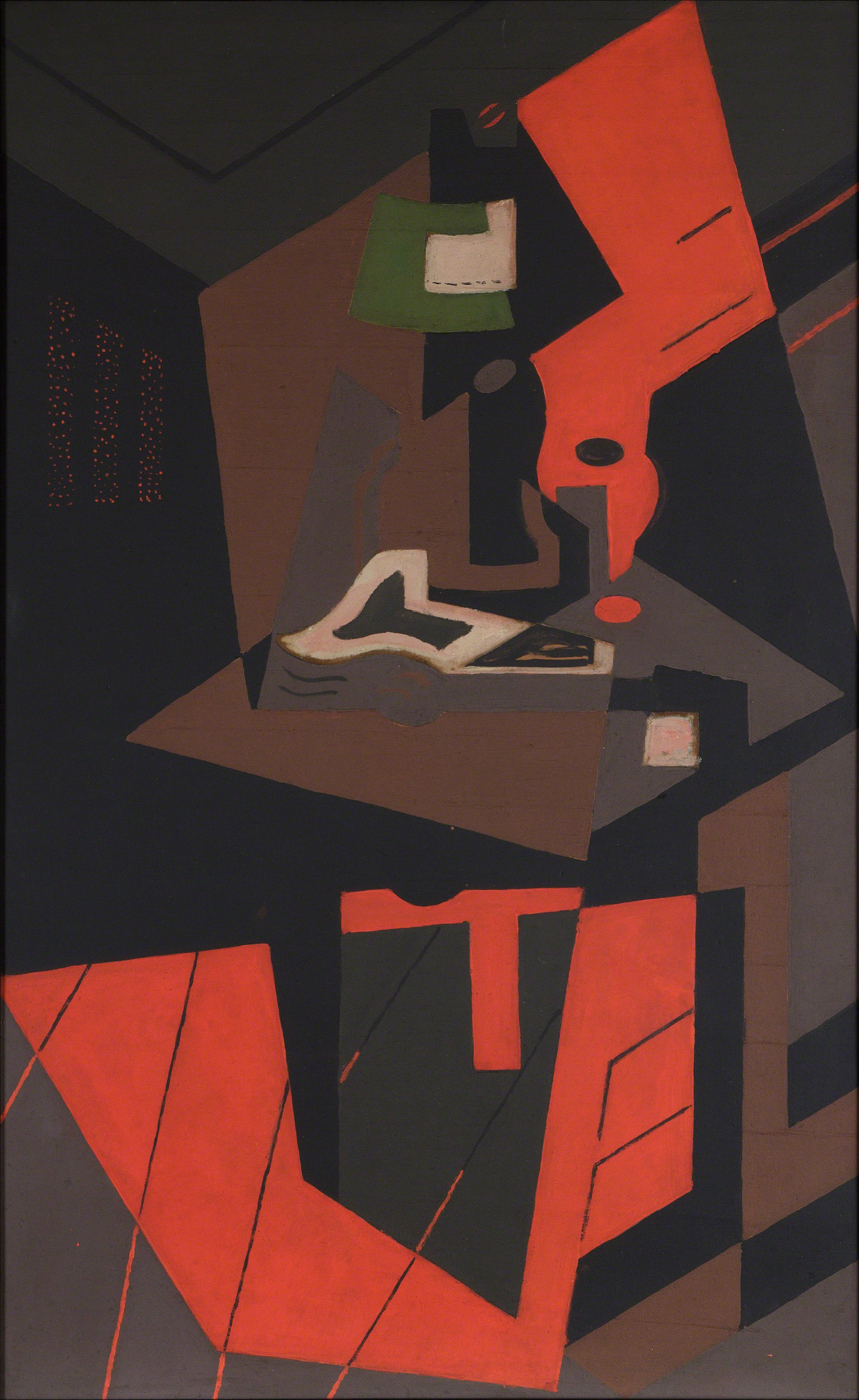
María Blanchard, 1916–18, Still Life with Red Lamp, oil on canvas, 115.6 × 73 cm

Demand for Blanchard's art increased after the 1920 showings in France and Belgium, and the 1921 exhibition at the Society of Independent Artists. She came into contact with significant art dealers, but due to the adverse economic situation which followed, many collectors stopped investing in her work. She became financially dependent on her friend, Frank Flausch (1878–1926) until his death. Without Flausch, Blanchard was able to sell paintings to galleries in Paris and a few private patrons.

In 1927, Gris died. Blanchard was severely affected and fell into a state of depression. Her sister, Carmen, and nephews came to live with her in Paris, alleviating her loneliness but worsening her financial situation. In her deteriorating health, Blanchard turned to religion and considered joining a convent, but never did. She continued painting to support her sister and nephews.

Blanchard's health gradually declined over the following years. She contracted tuberculosis, making it impossible for her to paint. On 5 April 1932, she died at age 51 in Paris.

== Legacy ==
Blanchard's work was featured in the Botin Foundation of Santander, Spain during 2012–2013. The Museo Nacional Centro de Arte Reina Sofía, Hood Museum of Art, and Courtauld Institute of Art display original works from Blanchard. In 2021, the Prado Museum approved the purchase of Blanchard's La Boulonnaise. Blanchard was described by Gris as "[having] talent." Jacques Lipchitz wrote about her, saying that Blanchard "was a sincere artist and her paintings contain a painful sentiment of unusual violence." Diego Rivera described her work as being "pure expression."

== Works selection ==
- Composición cubista (Cubist composition)
- Mujer con abanico (Woman with Fan)
- Nature morte cubiste (Cubist Still-life)
- Primeros pasos
- La Communiante
