= Claire Shuttleworth =

American painter (1867 - 1930)

Claire Shuttleworth (1867–1930) was an American painter.

Born in Buffalo, New York, to banker Henry J. Shuttleworth and his wife, Laura Wheeler, Shuttleworth later became a summer resident of Chippewa, Ontario, where she kept a studio called "Minglestreams". She studied art in her hometown and at the Art Students League of New York before traveling to Paris for more instruction; her instructors over time included George Bridgman, Raphaël Collin, and Luc-Olivier Merson. She showed work around the United States and abroad, including at the Paris Salon from 1896 to 1899. She studied at the Académie Vitti in Paris.

She belonged to the American Federation of Arts, the National Association of Women Painters and Sculptors, the Buffalo Society of Arts, and the Rockport Art Association during her career. The Buffalo Historical Society owns examples of her work, as does the Arnot Art Museum. Shuttleworth was known as the "Painter of the Niagara" for her association with that river and the falls, which she depicted over 100 times in her work; she was also active as a portrait miniaturist. She worked in oils, watercolor, and pencil. Her work is the subject of a display at the Burchfield Penney Art Center in Buffalo.
