= Tony Sisti =

American painter

- Painter, art dealer, and patron of the arts
- Born: 1901; New York City, New York, U.S.
- Died: 1983 (aged 81–82); Buffalo, New York, U.S.
- Education: Royal Academy of Fine Arts in Florence; Art Institute of Buffalo
- Known for: Painting, drawing, and art education
- Movement: Modern realism

Anthony J. Sisti (1901–1983) was an American artist, art instructor and patron of the arts. In his youth, Sisti was also a Bantam Weight boxer. As an artist, Sisti was best known for his oil paintings, drawings, and murals.

Sisti studied at the Royal Academy of Fine Arts in Florence, Italy. He then taught at the Art Institute of Buffalo before opening his own gallery in Buffalo, New York. Over the years, he painted portraits of many important political and business leaders. In 1981, the City of Buffalo named a park in his honor.

== Life ==
Sisti was born in Greenwich Village in 1901. He moved to Buffalo when he was ten. As a young man, Sisti began boxing at a local gym. A year later, he won the New York State’s 1918 Golden Gloves bantamweight championship. At that point, he became a professional boxer. Over the next twelve years, he boxed whenever he needed money. When he finally retired in 1930, he had fought 100 bouts, winning all but 15. However, his real passion was art.

From 1926 to 1931, Sisti studied visual arts at the Royal Academy of Fine Arts in Florence, eventually earning a doctor's degree in painting. During this period, he also traveled throughout Europe. He also accompanied Ernest Hemingway on a trip to the Congo. When he ran out of money, Sisti arranged a boxing match in Rome, winning enough money to finance his return to Buffalo. Later, he used the winnings from another fight to underwrite the cost of a personal art show in New York City.

Oil painting entitled Circus by Tony Sisti, 1934

Sisti joined the Art Institute of Buffalo as a member of the faculty in 1932. He taught painting and anatomy at the institute until 1938. During the mid-1930s, he also won several Works Projects Administration art commissions including a large oil painting called Circus and a mural at Buffalo’s City Hospital. Unfortunately, the mural no longer exists.

In 1938, he opened his own art studio on Franklin Street in the Allentown area of Buffalo. He continued to teach art as well, flying to Manhattan every week to teach drawing at the New York School of Applied Design for Women. Over the years, Sisti became an active member of the Allentown community. In 1958, he helped the Allentown neighborhood organize an outdoor art festival, serving as the event’s first chairman. Fifty years later, the Allentown Art Festival is still a popular annual event in Buffalo.

In 1979, Sisti made a major gift to the Burchfield-Penney Art Center, including 26 paintings and drawings by Charles E. Burchfield as well as 32 of his own works. In 1981, the City of Buffalo named a park in the Allentown area in his honor. Tony Sisti Park is located near the intersection of Franklin Street and North Street.

Sisti died in Buffalo on 15 December 1983. More than twenty-five years later, he is still remembered in Buffalo as a painter, art collector, and patron of the arts. In 2009, when the Burchfield-Penney Art Center opened its new museum on the campus of Buffalo State College, one of the main floor galleries was named after Sisti.

== Art work ==
Buffalo Mayor Steven Pankow, 1957

Tony Sisti was a painter, muralist, and drawing specialist. He was a classically trained artist, who studied at the Albright Art School in Buffalo and at Royal Academy of Fine Arts in Florence. He later became an art instructor at the Art Institute of Buffalo and then the New York School of Applied Design for Women in New York City. He was active as a professional painter from the mid-1920s until his death in 1983.

Sisti was known for his bold use of color and fluid action figures. He was an accomplished landscape painter, but he was especially noted for his paintings of boxing and other action scenes. His portrait of heavy weight contender Phil Muscato, titled The Boxer, won the Gold Medal at the 1953 Buffalo Society of Artists exhibition.

He was also well known as a formal portrait painter. President Franklin D. Roosevelt, New York Governor Alfred E. Smith, and Fiat Motor Company president Giovanni Agnelli were among the notable individuals who had portraits painted by Sisti. He also painter official portraits of at least one Buffalo mayor and a number of other Buffalo city officials.

Sisti’s works have been exhibited in major museums including the Museum of Modern Art in New York, the Pennsylvania Academy of the Fine Arts, and the Burchfield-Penney Art Center in Buffalo. The Burchfield-Penney Art Center also displays a number of Sisti’s paintings in its permanent collection.
