= Alice Halicka =

French painter

- Born: 20 December 1895; Kraków, Poland
- Died: 1 January 1975 (aged 80); Paris, France
- Known for: Painting
- Spouse: Louis Marcoussis (m. 1913)

Alice Halicka or Alicja Halicka (20 December 1895 – 1 January 1975) was a Polish-born painter who spent most of her life in France.

== Biography ==
Alicja Halicka was born in Kraków and studied with Józef Pankiewicz there. She studied with Simon Hollósy in Munich before moving to Paris in 1912, where she studied at Académie Ranson under Paul Sérusier and Maurice Denis. There she met and married the Cubist painter Louis Marcoussis in 1913. In 1921, she showed cubist work together with her husband at the Société des Artistes Indépendants. She also exhibited her work at the Galerie Georges Petit, Paris (1930–31), Le Centaure, Brussels, the Leicester Galleries, London (1934), the Marie Harriman Gallery, New York (1936), Julian Levy Gallery, New York (1937). Halicka painted in various styles but also produced work in fabric, including Romances capitonnées, and even made set designs for ballets which were performed at the Metropolitan Opera of New York and Covent Garden, London.

She spent World War II in France and wrote a memoir afterwards called Hier, souvenirs, published in 1946. Halicka died in Paris in 1975.

== Works ==
Alice Halicka's work is characterized by a great rigor of constructions (many architectural themes) combined with variety, fantasy and poetic inspiration. It includes many oil paintings, landscapes, still lifes, gouaches, drawings, collages, watercolours, engravings, decorative works on fabrics, decorative screens (for Helena Rubinstein), decorations for ballets (such as Le Baiser of Stravinsky's Fairy in 1937, which was performed at the Metropolitan Opera) and illustrations of literary works.

Alice Halicka's works can be found in many private collections and in the permanent collections of museums, such as the Museum of Jewish Art and History and the Museum of Modern Art in New York.
