= Milton Rogovin =

American photographer (1909–2011)

- Born: December 30, 1909; New York City, New York, United States
- Died: January 18, 2011 (aged 101); Buffalo, New York, United States
- Education: Columbia University, 1931, Optometry
- Occupation: Documentary photographer
- Spouse(s): Anne Snetsky (later changed to Setters), (m. 1942–2003)
- Website: www.miltonrogovin.com

Milton Rogovin Pronounced "ruh-GO-vin" (December 30, 1909 – January 18, 2011) was an American social documentary photographer. His photographs are in the Library of Congress, the J. Paul Getty Museum, and the Center for Creative Photography.

== Biography ==
=== Early years ===
Milton Rogovin was born December 30, 1909, in Brooklyn, New York City, of ethnic Jewish parents who emigrated to America from Lithuania, then part of the Russian Empire. He attended Stuyvesant High School in New York City and enrolled in Columbia University, from which he graduated in 1931 with a degree in optometry.

Following graduation Rogovin worked as an optometrist in New York City. Distressed by the rampant and worsening poverty resulting from the Great Depression, Rogovin began attending night classes at the New York Workers School, a radical educational institution sponsored by the Communist Party USA. In 1938 he moved to Buffalo and established an optometry practice there. In 1942, he was inducted into the U.S. Army, where he worked as an optometrist.

Rogovin was called before the House Un-American Activities Committee in 1957. Like many other Americans who embraced Communism as a model for improving the quality of life for the working class, he became a subject of the Committee's attentions in the postwar period: He was discredited—without having been convicted of any offense—as someone whose views henceforth had to be discounted as dangerous and irresponsible.

=== Photographer ===
The incident inspired Rogovin to turn to photography as a means of expression; it was a way to continue to speak to the worth and dignity of people who make their livings under modest or difficult circumstances, often in physically taxing occupations that usually receive little attention.

In 1957, a collaboration with William Tallmadge, a professor of music, to document music at storefront churches set Rogovin on his photographic path. Some of the photographs that Rogovin made in the churches were published in 1962 in Aperture magazine, edited by Minor White, with an introduction by W.E.B. Du Bois, a founder of the National Association for the Advancement of Colored People (NAACP).

Rogovin worked on a month-long photographic series on the island of Chiloé, Chile. Poet, Pablo Neruda helped guide Rogovin and provide friends to drive and introduce him to contacts throughout the Island.

In 1976 Rogovin began photographing steel workers and electrical workers in the Buffalo/Lackawanna area. Seven years after the initial series, Rogovin returned in 1987 to the homes of the workers and found that not one worker was working where they had been photographed previously. The factories were torn down and the equipment was sold to Mexico or China. Michael Frisch from the State University of New York at Buffalo recorded 2,300 hours of interviews with these workers.

From 1981 to 1990, Rogovin photographed coal miners, a project that took him to Zimbabwe, France, Scotland, Spain, Cuba, China, and Mexico. Many of these images were published in his first book, The Forgotten Ones. During his trip to Scotland for The Family of Miners series in 1982 he visited coalfield communities in Ayrshire, Fife and Midlothian.

Rogovin traveled throughout the world, taking portraits of workers and their families. His most acclaimed project, though, has been The Forgotten Ones, sequential portraits taken over three decades of over a hundred families who resided on Buffalo's impoverished Lower West Side. The project was begun in 1972 and completed in 2002. In 1999, the Library of Congress collected Rogovin's negatives, contact sheets and 1,300 of his prints. It also holds 20,000 pieces of correspondence. The Center for Creative Photography holds 3,300 master prints—the master collection of Rogovin photography. Rogovin's Rolleiflex camera, his FBI files and other resources are held by the Burchfield Penney Art Center in Buffalo, NY.

Rogovin died on January 18, 2011, a few weeks after his 101st birthday.

== Personal life ==
In 1942, he married Anne Snetsky (later changed to Setters). After his discharge from the Army, Milton and Anne had three children: two daughters (Ellen and Paula) and a son (Mark).

== Publications ==
- Milton Rogovin, Lower West Side, Buffalo, New York. Buffalo, NY: Albright-Knox Art Gallery, 1975.
- Milton Rogovin: The Forgotten Ones. Buffalo, NY: Albright-Knox Art Gallery, 1985. ISBN 0-295-96213-5.
- Windows that Open inward: Images of Chile. Buffalo, NY: White Pine, 1985. ISBN 0-934834-51-2, ISBN 0-934834-46-6 (paper). Buffalo, NY: White Pine, 1999. ISBN 1-877727-89-X.
- Portraits in Steel. Ithaca, NY: Cornell University Press, 1993. ISBN 0-8014-2253-1, ISBN 0-8014-8102-3.
- Triptychs: Buffalo's Lower West Side Revisited. New York: Norton, 1994. ISBN 0-393-03588-3.
- The Bonds between Us: A Celebration of Family. Buffalo, NY: White Pine, 2001. ISBN 1-893996-02-6.
- Milton Rogovin: The Forgotten Ones. New York: Quantuck Lane, 2003. ISBN 0-9714548-5-X, ISBN 0-9714548-6-8.
- With Eyes and Soul: Images of Cuba. Buffalo, NY: White Pine, 2004. ISBN 1-893996-25-5.
- Milton Rogovin: The Mining Photographs. Los Angeles: J. Paul Getty Museum, 2005. ISBN 0-89236-811-X.
- The Lens and the Pen: Photographs and Poems. Arroyo Seco, NM: Palisade, 2009. ISBN 0-9818528-3-1.
- From the Western Door to the Lower West Side. Buffalo, NY: White Pine, 2010. ISBN 1-935210-10-6.
- Before and After Coal: Images and Voices from Scotland's Mining Communities, Edinburgh: National Galleries of Scotland, 2024. ISBN 978-1-911054-69-6.
