= Louis Marcoussis =

French painter

- Marcoussis photographed by Aram Alban sometime in the 1930s
- Born: Ludwik Kazimierz Wladyslaw Markus; 1878 or 1883; Łódź
- Died: October 22, 1941; Cusset
- Education: Kraków Academy of Fine Arts, Académie Julian
- Movement: Cubism, School of Paris
- Spouse: Alice Halicka

Louis Marcoussis (born Ludwik Kazimierz Wladyslaw Markus or Ludwig Casimir Ladislas Markus; 1878 or 1883 – October 22, 1941) was a Polish-French avant-garde painter active primarily in Paris. Markus studied law in Warsaw before attending the Kraków Academy of Fine Arts, and later moved to Paris to study under Jules Lefebvre at the Académie Julian. His work was first featured in a major exhibition at the Salon d'Automne in 1905. In Paris, he became acquainted with prominent artists of the School of Paris and writers in the cafes of Montmartre and Montparnasse.

Guillaume Apollinaire, an artist and poet of Polish descent active in the Parisian avant-garde circles, suggested his French name, Marcoussis, named after a village near Paris. Marcoussis's early paintings were influenced by Impressionism, but he later became a part of the Cubist movement around 1911. He exhibited his works across Europe and the United States and held his first solo exhibition in Paris in 1925.

Starting around 1930, Marcoussis focused more on printmaking and illustration, inspired by works of poets like Apollinaire and Éluard. During the late 1930s, he collaborated with Spanish surrealist Joan Miró, teaching him etching techniques which resulted in Miró’s renowned Black and Red Series. During the Nazi occupation of Paris in 1940, Marcoussis and his wife Alice moved to Cusset near Vichy where he died on 22 October 1941.

== Life and work ==
=== Early life and education ===
He was born in Łódź, Poland. After studying law briefly in Warsaw he went to the Kraków Academy of Fine Arts, where his teachers included Jan Stanislawski and Jozev Mehoffer. Moving to Paris in 1903, he spent a short time at the Académie Julian under Jules Lefebvre. The first time a painting of his was shown in a major exhibition was at the Salon d'Automne in 1905, and over the next quarter-century his work was shown in many other important exhibitions, in particular at the Salon des Indépendants and the Salon des Tuileries.

He drew cartoons for satirical journals, as he had earlier in Poland. In Paris he needed to earn his own living, and also took on other drawing and illustration work. In the cafés of Montmartre and Montparnasse he got to know Apollinaire, Braque, Degas, Picasso and many more artists and writers. It was Apollinaire who suggested Markus' French name, Marcoussis, after a village not far from Paris.

=== Cubism and the avant-garde ===
Impressionism influenced his early paintings, but from about 1911 he was part of the Cubist movement alongside other avant-garde painters like Picasso, Braque, Juan Gris and those of the Section d'Or. His work was shown in exhibitions in many European cities and in the US. In 1925 he had his first solo exhibition in Paris. As well as painting still lifes and musical instruments in the Cubist manner, he also produced portraits, views of Paris, and images from the Breton seaside.

In 1913 he had married Alice Halicka, a painter who came from Kraków. Their daughter Malène was born in 1922. Marcoussis served in a Polish company of the French Foreign Legion from 1914 to 1919. He became a French citizen, while also staying in touch with Poland, both personally and professionally. He did not generally talk about his Jewish ancestry, and his family had converted to Catholicism, but today Marcoussis is often described as a Jewish artist. In 1926, he participated, along with Halicka, in Katherine Dreier's expansive Société Anonyme exhibition organized at the Brooklyn Museum.

=== Later life and death ===
From 1930 onwards, much as his friend Clément Serveau, he concentrated on printmaking and illustration, including work inspired by Apollinaire's Alcool, Tzara's Indicateur des chemins de cœur, and Éluard's Lingères légères and Aurélia. In the late 1930s Marcoussis collaborated with Spanish surrealist Joan Miró and taught him etching techniques, culminating in Miró's Black and Red Series, now in the collection of the Museum of Modern Art.

After Nazi troops arrived in Paris in 1940, Marcoussis and Alice moved to Cusset near Vichy. He died there on 22 October 1941.

== Selected exhibitions ==
- 1905 Salon d'Automne, Paris
- 1906 Salon des Indépendants, Paris
- 1912 Salon de la Section d'Or, Paris
- 1920 Exposition de la Section d'Or, Paris
- 1925 Galerie Le Pierre, Paris
- 1928 Galerie Le Centaure, Brussels
- 1929 Galerie Georges Bernheim, Paris
- 1929 Galerie Jeanne Bucher, Paris
- 1933 Galerie Knoedler, New York City
- 1934 Arts Club, Chicago
- 1936 Palais des Beaux-Arts, Brussels
- 1937 Palais des Beaux-Arts, Brussels
- 1939 London Gallery, London
- 1949 Retrospective in Paris
- 1950 Retrospective in Basel
- 1951 Retrospective in Brussels

(List from German Wikipedia)

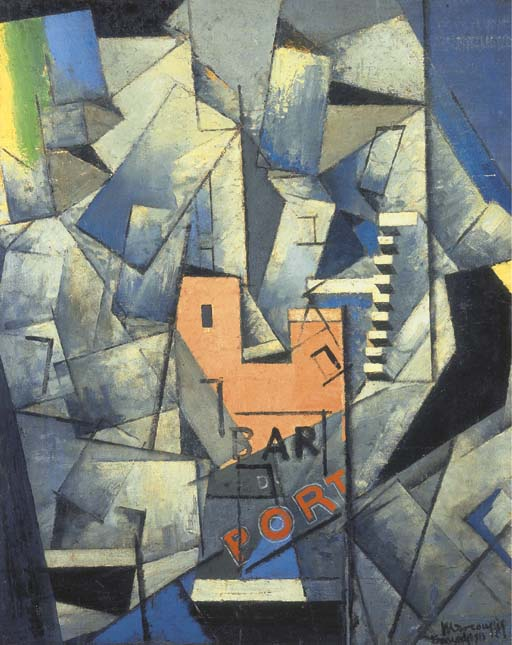
Le bar du port. Signed, inscribed and dated Marcoussis Banyuls 1913. Oil on canvas, 80.8 x 65 cm

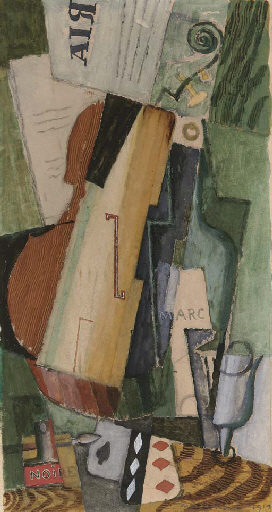
Violon, bouteilles de Marc et cartes (Violin, Marc bottles and cards). Signed and dated Marcoussis 1919. Gouache and watercolor over charcoal on paper, 45.8 x 24.5 cm

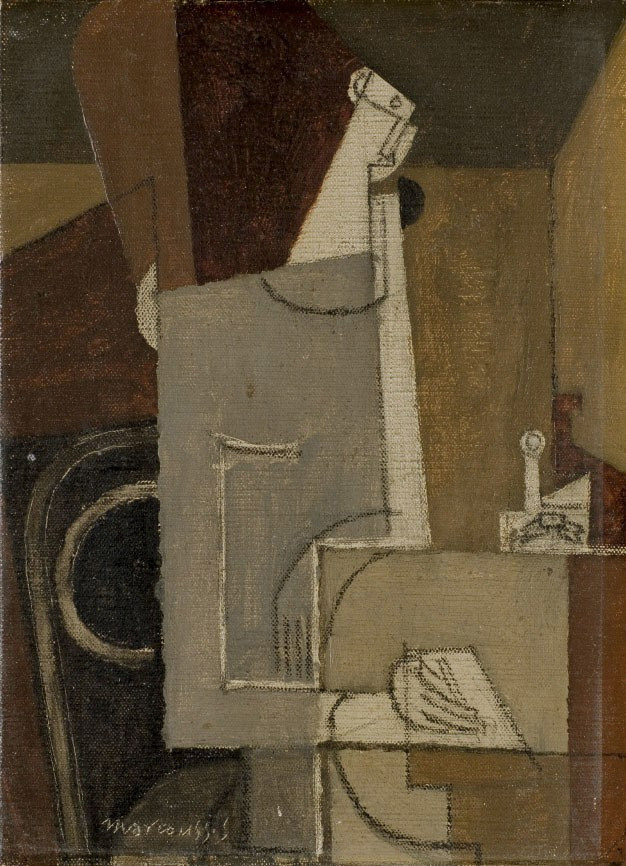
Personnage écrivant. Signed Marcoussis. Oil and charcoal on canvas, 22 x 16.5 cm

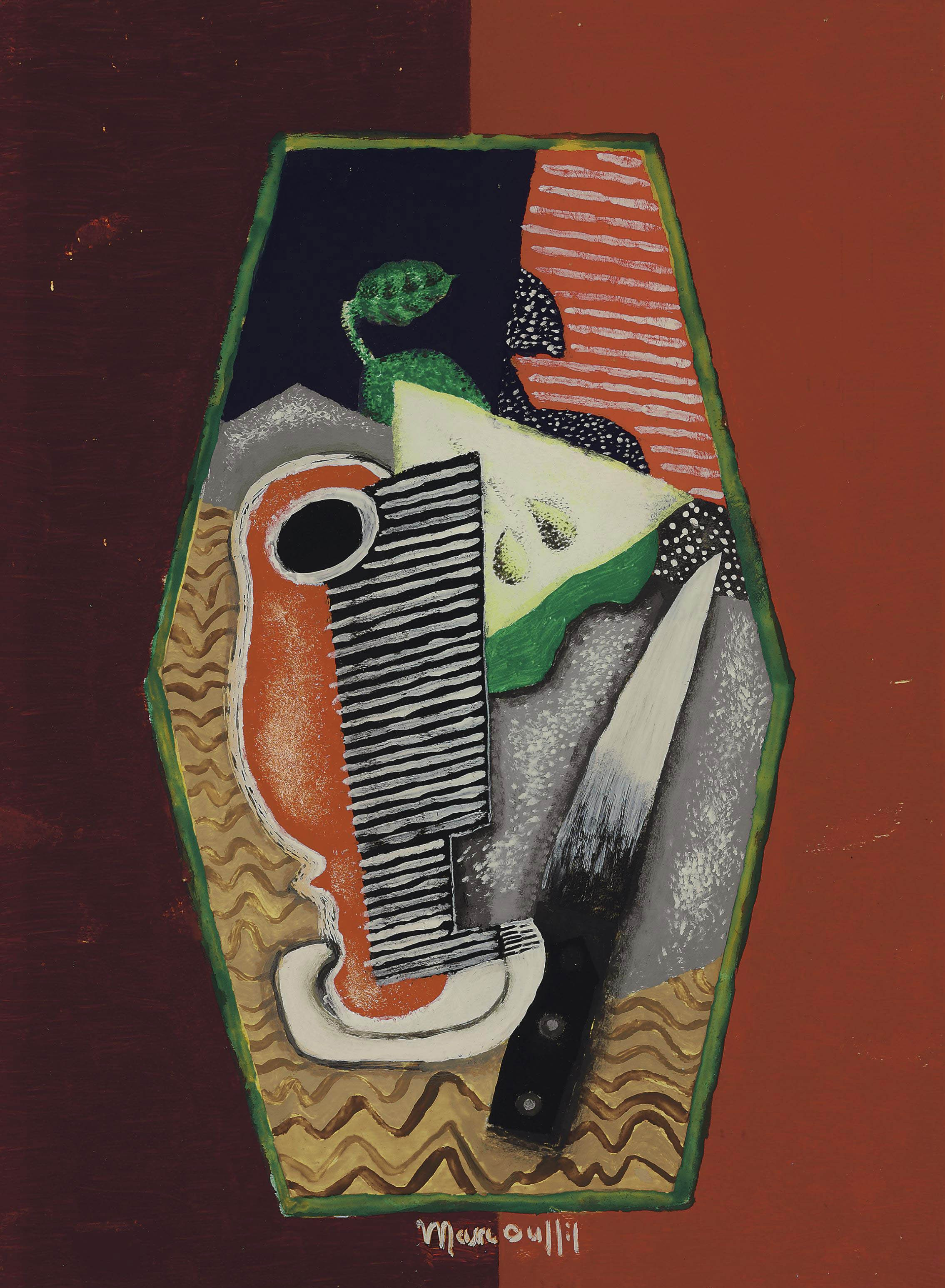
Poire verte et couteau (Green pear and knife). Signed Marcoussis. Oil on glass, 36.2 x 26 cm
