= Wiscasset Middle High School =

Public middle school and high school in Wiscasset, Maine, United States

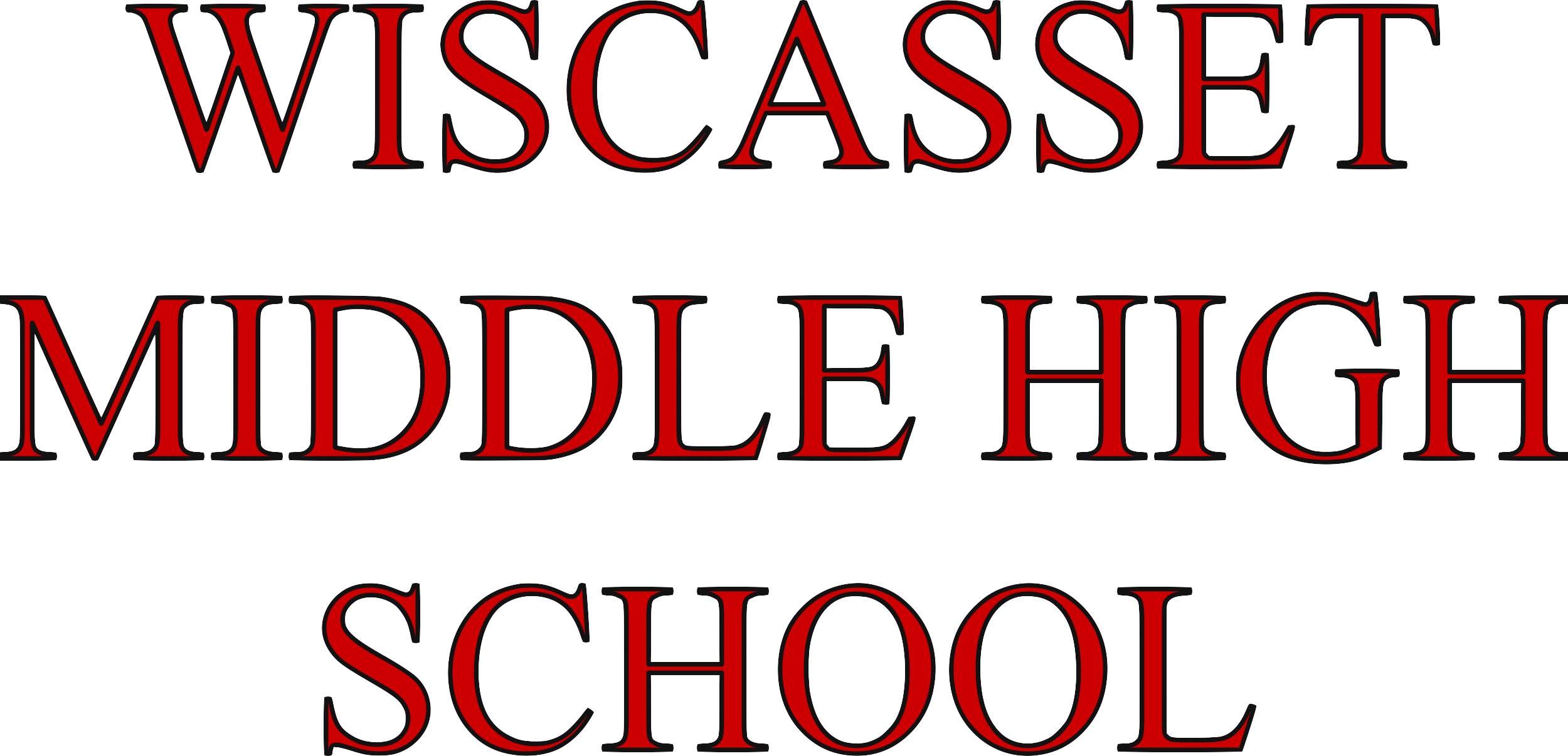

Location
- 272 Gardiner Road; Wiscasset, Maine 04578; United States
- Coordinates: 44.02298°N 69.67209°W

Information
- Former name: Wiscasset Academy (1805–1951)
- Type: Public middle school and high school
- Established: 1805; 221 years ago
- School district: Wiscasset Public Schools
- Superintendent: Kim Andersson
- Principal: Sarah Hubert
- Teaching staff: 22.60 (FTE)
- Grades: 6–12
- Enrollment: 237 (2023–2024)
- Student to teacher ratio: 10.49
- Campus size: 25 acres
- Campus type: Rural
- Colors: Red and black
- Athletics conference: Mountain Valley Conference; Busline League
- Mascot: Wolverine
- Nickname: Wolverines
- Rival: Boothbay Region High School
- Yearbook: The Red and Black
- Communities served: Wiscasset
- Website: Wiscasset Middle High School

Wiscasset Middle High School (Wiscasset or WMHS) is a public middle school and high school in Wiscasset, Maine. The school serves the town of Wiscasset, but accepts students from neighboring towns that lack a middle school or high school. The middle school and high school in Wiscasset operated separately until 2015, when the middle school was moved into the high school building.

== History ==
The first secondary school established by the town of Wiscasset was Wiscasset Academy. The academy was established by a town vote in 1805. The "Old Academy" as it is now called, operated at the Red Brick School building for over 100 years, from 1807 until 1923.

A new high school building was constructed at the site that would later be used by Wiscasset Middle School, starting in 1951. The name Wiscasset Academy continued until 1951, when it was changed to Wiscasset High School. Wiscasset Middle School was built in three different construction efforts, 1951, 1968, and renovation in 2004. The building housed roughly 220 students at its peak occupancy in the late 1990s. The current Wiscasset High School building was constructed in 1961 with an addition to the facility constructed in 1974. Since that time WHS has housed grades 9–12 continually. The maximum reported enrollment for WHS was 448 students in the late 1990s.

The athletic nickname and mascot of WHS was originally the "Redskins". The mascot was changed in 2011 due to the rising controversy surrounding Native American mascots, and the offensive history behind the term redskin. After a school wide vote, the wolverine was selected to be the school's new mascot.

In 2015, due to a declining student population, Wiscasset Middle School was moved into the high school building, which was operating at half capacity, creating Wiscasset Middle High School. The old middle school building is now the Wiscasset Elementary School.

== Athletics ==
=== Middle School ===
The sports teams at Wiscasset Middle School include Baseball, Basketball, Cheerleading, Cross country, Soccer, Softball, and Track and field. WMS competes in the Busline League, which includes schools across the Midcoast.

=== High School ===
Due to declining enrollment and student participation, Wiscasset has combined certain sports teams with Boothbay Region High School and Morse High School. Boothbay-Wiscasset teams are nicknamed the "Seawolves", a combination of Boothbay's Seahawk and Wiscasset's Wolverine. Boothbay-Wiscasset's colors are blue and red.

Varsity sports teams at Wiscasset High School include Baseball, Basketball, Cheerleading (at Morse), Cross country (at Boothbay), Football (at Boothbay), Soccer, Softball, Swimming, and Track and field (indoor at Boothbay).

WHS is a member of the Mountain Valley Conference and has won several State Championships.

- Boys' Basketball – (Class C) 1991
- Boys' Cross Country – (Class C) 1975, 1989
- Girls' Cross Country – (Class C) 2001
- Boys' Soccer – (Class C) 1994

== Notable alumni ==
- Thomas Bowman, U.S. Representative
- Franklin Clark, U.S. Representative
- Cadwallader C. Washburn, 11th governor of Wisconsin
- Charles Ames Washburn, U.S. minister to Paraguay
- Israel Washburn Jr., 29th governor of Maine
- William D. Washburn, U.S. Senator
