= Burchfield Penney Art Center =

Coordinates: 42°55′53.55″N 78°52′39.51″W

- Established: December 9, 1966
- Location: Buffalo State University, Buffalo, New York, United States
- Type: Art museum
- Collection size: Over 12,000 works by Western New York artists
- Director: Scott Propeack
- Curators: Tullis Johnson, Tiffany Gaines, Scott Propeack, and Nancy Weekly
- Public transit access: Metro Bus 20
- Website: www.burchfieldpenney.org

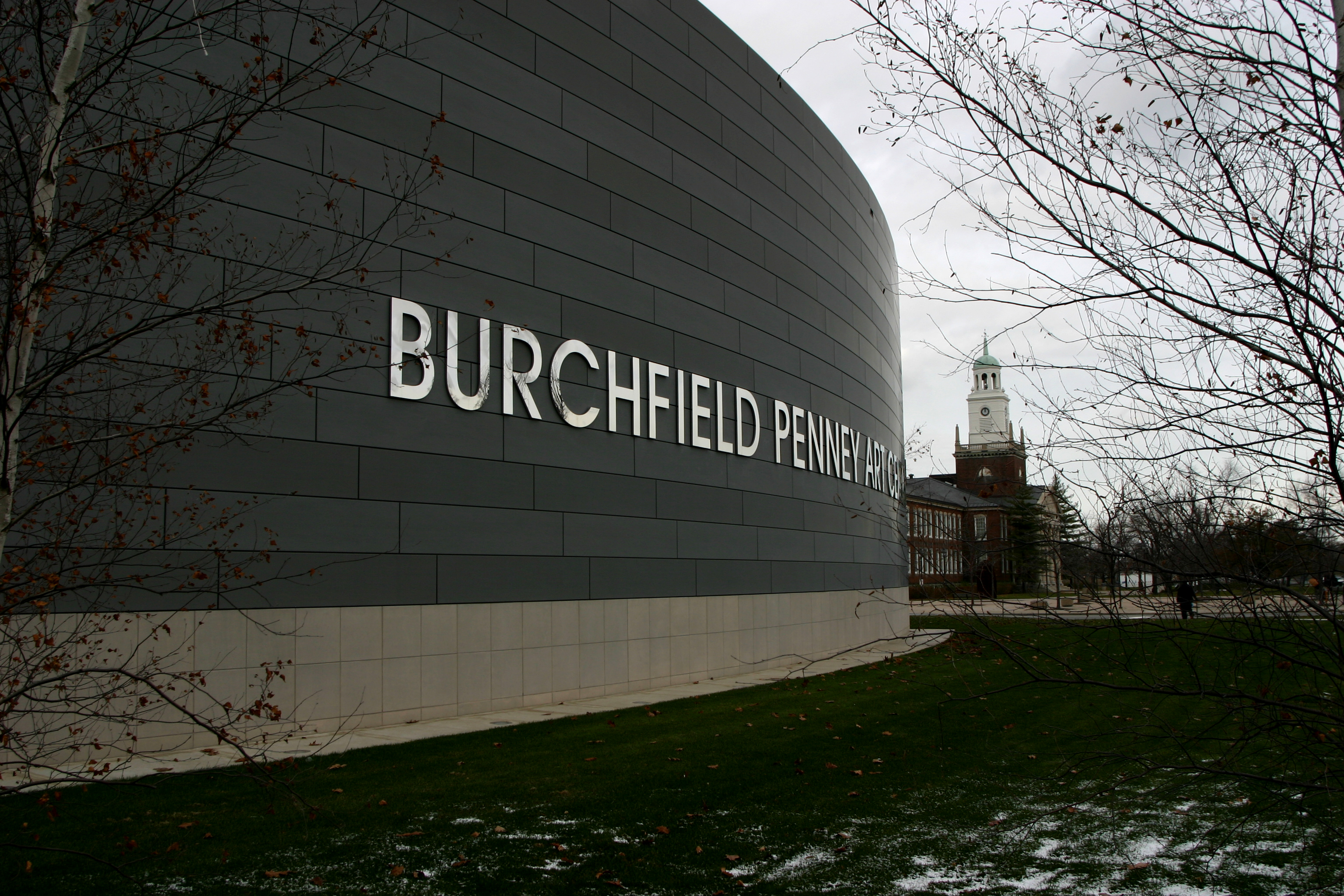
Burchfield Penney Art Center

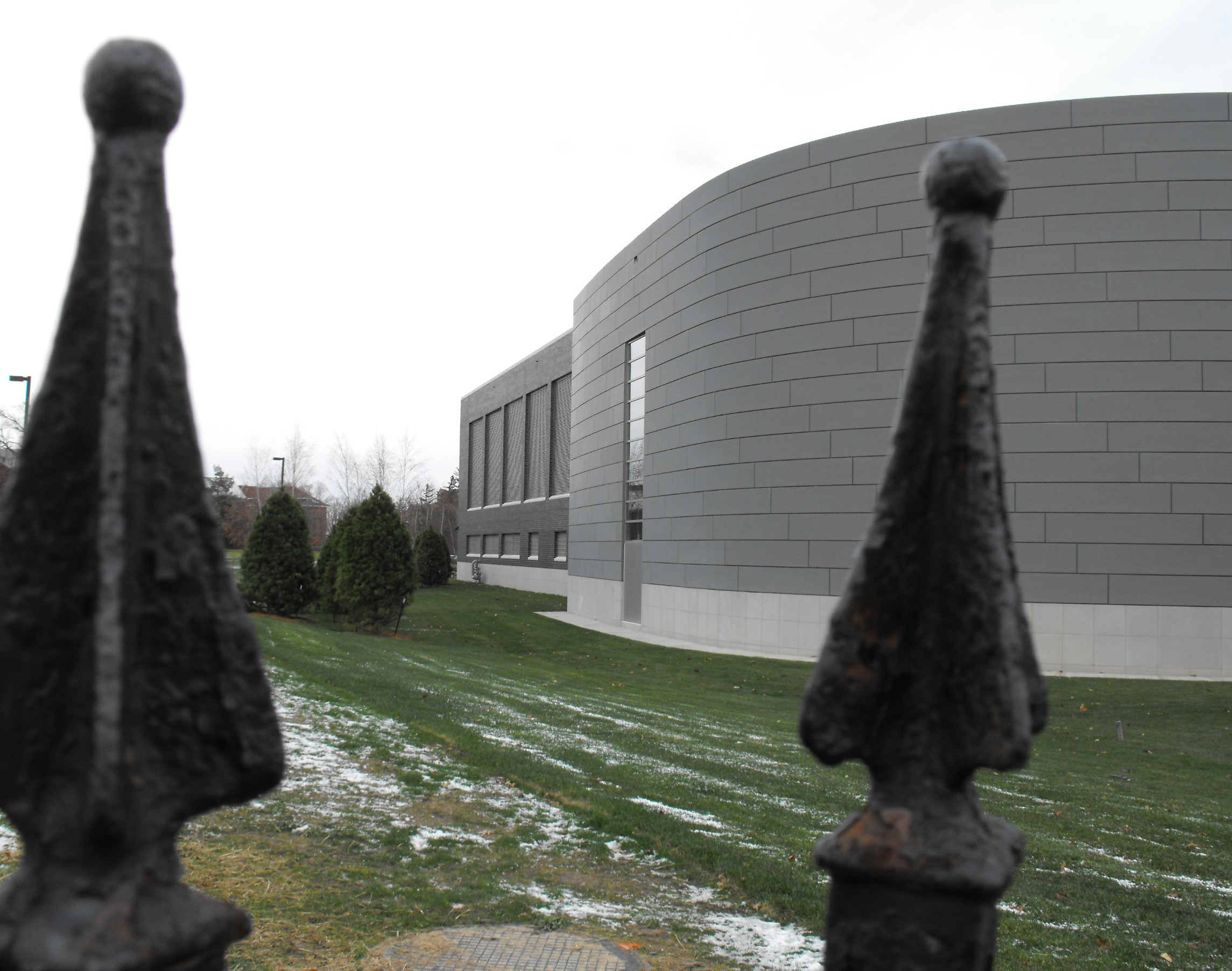
Burchfield Penney Art Center

The Burchfield Penney Art Center, or just the Burchfield Penney, is an arts and educational institution part of Buffalo State University, located adjacent to the main campus in Buffalo, New York, United States. Dedicated to the art and vision of American painter Charles E. Burchfield, it was founded in 1966 as the Charles E. Burchfield Center. The center features a museum, library, and activity space for the arts. It maintains the world's largest collection of Burchfield's work, as well as many other distinguished artists of Buffalo, Niagara and Western New York. It is engaged with every aspect of Buffalo and the region's rich cultural activity.

== History ==
Originally named the Charles E. Burchfield Center, the museum held its official opening ceremonies on 9 December 1966 in Rockwell Hall, with Burchfield himself in attendance. Burchfield died just a month and a day after the museum's inauguration.

The museum moved to a new home located on 4.9 acres (20,000 m^{2}) of land at the corner of Elmwood Avenue and Rockwell Road in Buffalo, New York in November 2008. The Burchfield Penney opened in its new location on November 22, 2008, with a 31-hour non-stop grand opening event. The new 84,000-square-foot (7,800 m^{2}) museum is designed by Gwathmey Siegel & Associates Architects.

Today, one of the Burchfield Penney's main goals is to be unique and inviting to the public. Its "Front Yard" exhibit features three tall steel projectors which project constantly-changing artwork onto the exterior of the building. According to Buffalo News critic Colin Dabkowski, "The Front Yard thwarts immediate judgement because it is always in a state of becoming something else." (para. 16). The museum continually connects to educational institutions, specifically Buffalo State University.

== Collection ==
The museum's permanent collection spans the late 19th century through today. The collection includes the world's largest collection of Burchfield's works, as well as a large archive of his drawings, notes and journals. Although the museum focuses on the work of Burchfield, it is the only museum dedicated completely to the art and artists of Buffalo, and features more than 18 exhibitions each year.

Other components of the collection range from traditional mid-nineteenth century work to contemporary media arts. Notable artists in the collection also include Claire Shuttleworth, Virginia Cuthbert, Charles Cary Rumsey, Steina Vasulka, Paul Sharits, Ruth Erb Hoffman, and many others. It also includes work by Hallwalls founders: Charles Clough, Robert Longo, Diane Bertolo, Nancy Dwyer, Cindy Sherman, and Michael Zwack. The collection also includes one of the world's largest collections of the documentary photographer Milton Rogovin, paintings and prints by J.J. Lankes (who was a native of Buffalo), and work by Arts and Craft artisans from Roycroft. The center has also hosted screenings of experimental film and video works by artists connected to Buffalo media study, including Tony Conrad, Steina and Woody Vasulka, James Blue, Paul Sharits, and Hollis Frampton.

== See also ==
- List of single-artist museums
