= Matt Faulkner =

Matt Faulkner may refer to:

- Matt Faulkner, author of the book Most Likely to Survive
- Matt Faulkner, quarterback for the 2011 San Jose State Spartans football team
