= West Seneca West Senior High School =

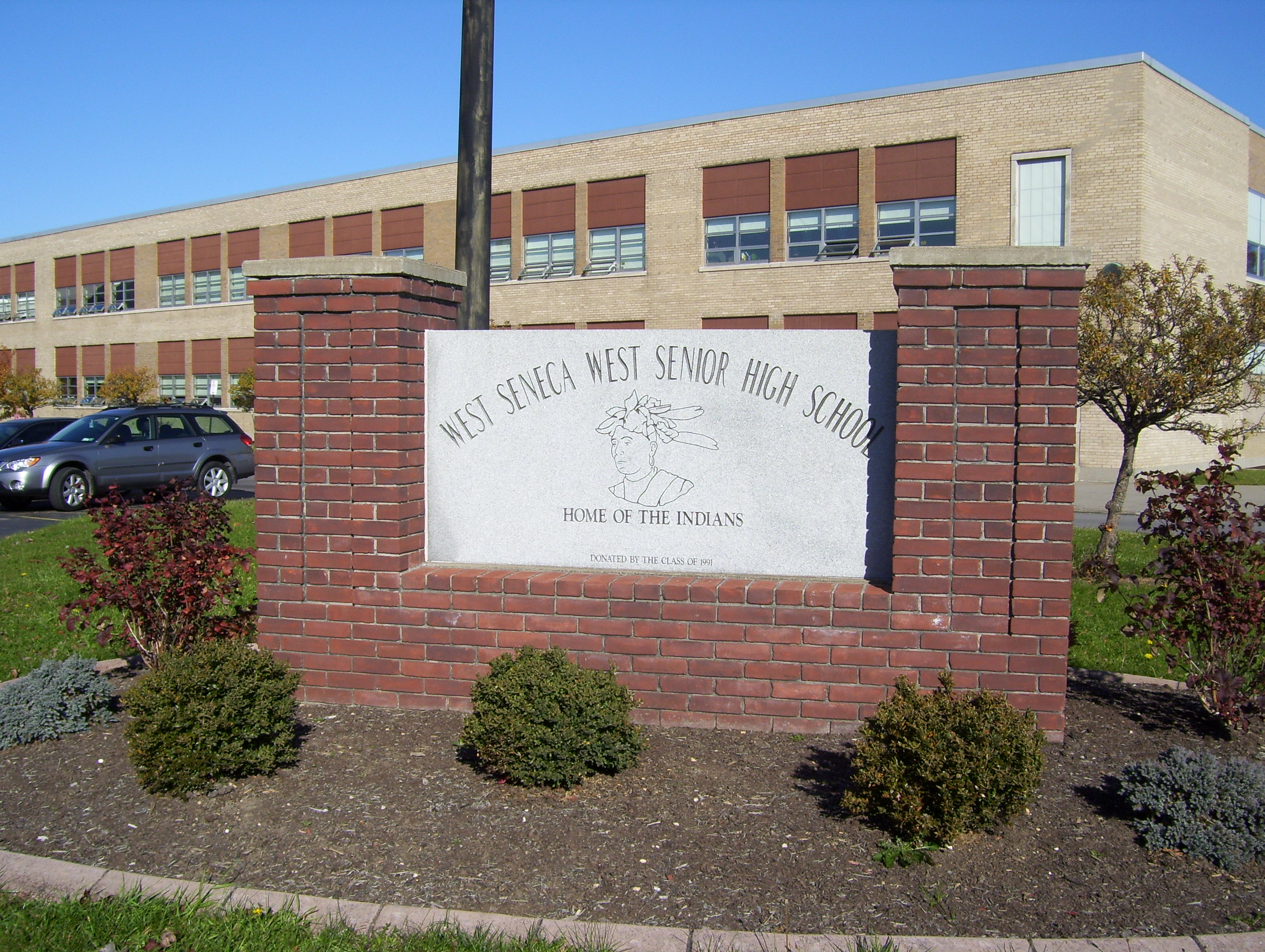

Location
- 3330 Seneca Street; West Seneca, NY; 42.8324°N 78.77409°W

Information
- Type: Public
- Established: 1949
- School district: West Seneca Central School District
- Principal: John Brinker
- Faculty: 77.44 FTE
- Grades: 9-12
- Enrollment: 1,231 (2017–18)
- Color
- Website: West Seneca West High School

West Seneca West Senior High is a public, co-educational high school in the West Seneca Central School District and serves grades nine through twelve in West Seneca, New York, United States. It is accredited by the New York State Board of Regents.

Built in 1949 as West Seneca Junior-Senior High School, it was renamed West Seneca West Senior High School in 1970, after overcrowding resulted in the building of West Seneca East Senior High School. A continued population surge created a need for a three-floor addition in the 1970s, which included two floors of science and math laboratories and housing for a larger library and student services office. This addition is now known to the students as the new wing while the original floor plan, which was also modified, is known as the old wing. The addition also created the space over the main entrance, known as "the bridge", a multi-use academic space, also providing a second access to the new wing from the old wing.

Athletics The sports team's colors are blue and yellow. Previously, they went by the name West Seneca Indians. After a mascot change in 2023, they currently go by West Seneca West Warhawks.

In 2017, the football team won the New York State class A championship.

== Notable alumni ==
- Matt Anderson- Professional volleyball player, member of 2012 London Olympic team
- Jeremy Kelley - Former NFL wide receiver, and currently alumni manager of the Buffalo Bills
- Justin Strzelczyk - former NFL offensive lineman
- Keith Rothfus - US Congressman
