= Charles Burchfield Home and Studio =

House and studio of painter Charles Burchfield in West Seneca, New York

- Charles Burchfield's House & Studio at 3574 Clinton Street, West Seneca, New York
- Interactive map of Charles Burchfield Home and Studio
- 42.8558°N 78.7517°W
- Type: House and artist's studio
- Location: 3574 Clinton Street, West Seneca, New York, U.S.

History
- Built: House built c. 1880 - Studio built 1928

Site notes
- Owner: Private

The Charles Burchfield Home and Studio also known as the Gardenville Studio, is a house and detached painting studio in the Gardenville section of West Seneca, New York, United States, and the former residence of the American watercolorist Charles E. Burchfield (1893–1967), who lived and worked there from 1925 until his death. His biographer John I. H. Baur wrote that virtually all of Burchfield's mature work was made in the studio, apart from the watercolors he painted outdoors, and that the house and yard were themselves the subjects of a number of his works.

Both buildings survive. The property has remained in private hands and is opened to the public on occasion.

Since 1998 the Burchfield Penney Art Center in Buffalo, which holds the largest collection of the artist's work, has maintained a permanent re-creation of the studio as part of its displays, and in 2013 it mounted an exhibition devoted to the building.

== Description ==
The house is a small two-story frame dwelling, built about 1880. It stands on a narrow lot, about 34 feet wide and 449 feet deep.

The studio stands halfway down the backyard. Baur described it as a small building scarcely the size of a one-car garage. It is fitted with north-facing skylights and was designed for year-round use, with a custom six-panel skylight dormer lighting the painting area. The front room was lined with plywood shelves on which Burchfield stored studies, and he kept mounted specimens there, among them a snowy owl and two crows now in the permanent collection of the Burchfield Penney Art Center. Burchfield built an addition to the studio in the 1930s or early 1940s, and further small outbuildings were joined to it in 1959 and 1960, adding space for painting, for storing finished work, and for making picture frames.

The grounds, often the subject of Burchfields paintings, were described by him from a bench outside the studio, and held vegetable and flower beds, young trees, and plots kept by his children, with the garage and house behind. In April 1935 he replanted the back and side gardens to open a wide lawn behind the garage.

== History ==
Burchfield and his wife Bertha moved to 3574 Clinton Street in April 1925, having previously lived at two addresses in Buffalo. They raised five children at the house, and he remained there until his death.

The studio was built in September 1928. In the summer of 1930 it was shifted further back on the lot and set on a concrete foundation. Beyond providing a place to paint, it was where Burchfield sorted and worked with the sketches and notes he made in the field as well as figuring his approach to each finished picture. In a journal entry of November 17, 1933 he wrote that he hoped the studio would be "hallowed by large adventurous thoughts" and set apart from the banalities of ordinary life.

The earliest recorded description of the studio dates from a visit in January 1929 by the collectors Edward and Grace Root with Harry Yates, who recalled it as a small and orderly "hen-house studio". The early watercolors Burchfield showed them led to Frank Rehn becoming his dealer and to an exhibition of those works at the Museum of Modern Art the following year. The studio received many visitors after Burchfield began painting full time later that year, but he soon restricted access, thereafter admitting few people. In 1955 John I. H. Baur became the first scholar given extensive access to the material held there, in preparation for the retrospective at the Whitney Museum of American Art the following year.

Around 1933 Burchfield began to question his reliance on studio work, writing to his patron Edward Root that he had ceased to take fresh impressions of nature at first hand, and resolving to paint directly in front of his subjects.

From the mid-1950s failing health increasingly confined Burchfield to the house and studio, and the material stored there allowed him to continue working when he could no longer sketch outdoors. He was painting in the studio until the day before his death on January 10, 1967. Bertha Burchfield continued to live at the property until her own death. The contents of the studio were cleared and preserved, and more than six hundred watercolors together with drawings and other working material were sent to his dealer, the Frank Rehn Gallery in New York; much of it is now held by the Charles E. Burchfield Foundation.

The property has remained in private hands since, and is opened to the public on occasion, including for BurchFest, an annual arts festival held in West Seneca since 2023.

== The property in Burchfield's work ==
House Corner in Spring

Burchfield's grounds supplied a good part of his subject material. As he grew older he spent more time, particularly in winter, watching the landscape from the house, and the backyard became the focus of many drawings and watercolors. He used the fence on the property repeatedly as a subject, naming six works in which he considered it as indispensable.

The 1997 travelling retrospective The Paintings of Charles Burchfield: North by Midwest, organized by the Columbus Museum of Art and shown there, at the Burchfield Penney Art Center and at the National Museum of American Art, was arranged in four thematic sections, one of which was titled "Views from the House and Studio". The accompanying volume includes discussion of the specific house views Burchfield painted in Salem and Gardenville.

Selected works associated with the property include the following.

- Cannas and Studio, also recorded as Canna Bed (1931). The studio seen behind the bed of cannas planted beside it. Crystal Bridges Museum of American Art, Bentonville, Arkansas, as a promised gift.
- Garden House (c. 1931). Identified by Baur as a subject taken from Burchfield's own backyard. Collection unknown.
- Winter Bouquet (1933). A still life arranged in the studio window. Museum of Fine Arts, Boston.
- Rainy Day (1935). An interior of the house, showing the artist's son Charles Arthur reading with his toys at his feet. Private collection.
- View of Garden Plants beyond Fence (1937). Garden plants seen beyond a fence. Karen and Kevin Kennedy Collection.
- December Storm (1941 to 1960). Sunlight breaking through storm clouds above houses visible from the backyard. Burchfield Penney Art Center.
- Blackbirds in the Snow (1941 to 1945). A winter view across the backyard toward blackbirds feeding on the remains of the garden, with the studio at the left and houses beyond. Walker Art Center, Minneapolis.
- The Studio (1942). The rear of the studio and its northern skylights. Burchfield Penney Art Center.
- Budding Poplar Branches (1942). A Carolina poplar and the chicken house on the property immediately to the east, treated as an outdoor study in the manner of a still life. Dayton Art Institute.
- Winter Sunlight and Shadow (1946). The corner of the garage and the front of the studio, with Orchard Avenue beyond.
- Winter Light, Backyard (1949 to 1960). The view from the house, with the corner of the studio at the left. Begun in 1949 and revised periodically over the following decade. Whitney Museum of American Art.
- East Wind and Winter Sun (1951). Identified as the rear of the studio and the house seen from the back of the lot. Baltimore Museum of Art, Edward Joseph Gallagher III Memorial Collection.
- Still-Life in Winter (1951). A still life arranged in the studio, incorporating the mounted snowy owl Burchfield kept there, with pine foliage and a sunflower. Smithsonian American Art Museum.
- Birch Tree and Houses (date unknown). Tentatively identified by Baur as a backyard subject.
- Study of Thistle (1961). One of a series of studies of two large thistle plants growing in the backyard just outside the studio door. Whitney Museum of American Art.

== Studio re-creation at the Burchfield Penney Art Center ==
The Burchfield Penney Art Center in Buffalo, which holds the largest collection of Burchfield's work, maintains a permanent scale re-creation of the Gardenville studio. Designed in 1998, it represents the studio as it appeared in the artist's final years and is installed beside the galleries devoted to his paintings. The re-creation incorporates objects donated by the foundation, by members of Burchfield's family, and by former neighbours.

In 2013 the museum mounted an exhibition devoted to the building, Charles E. Burchfield: The Studio, presented by the Charles E. Burchfield Foundation.

== See also ==
- Burchfield Homestead, Burchfield's boyhood home in Salem, Ohio
- Burchfield Penney Art Center
