= East Seneca, New York =

Hamlet in New York, United States

Coordinates: 42°50′05″N 78°42′44″W

East Seneca is a hamlet in the town of West Seneca in Erie County, New York, United States. It is home to the East Seneca Fire Department and the West Seneca East Senior High School and Middle School.
