= Jeremy Kelley =

American gridiron football player (born 1988)

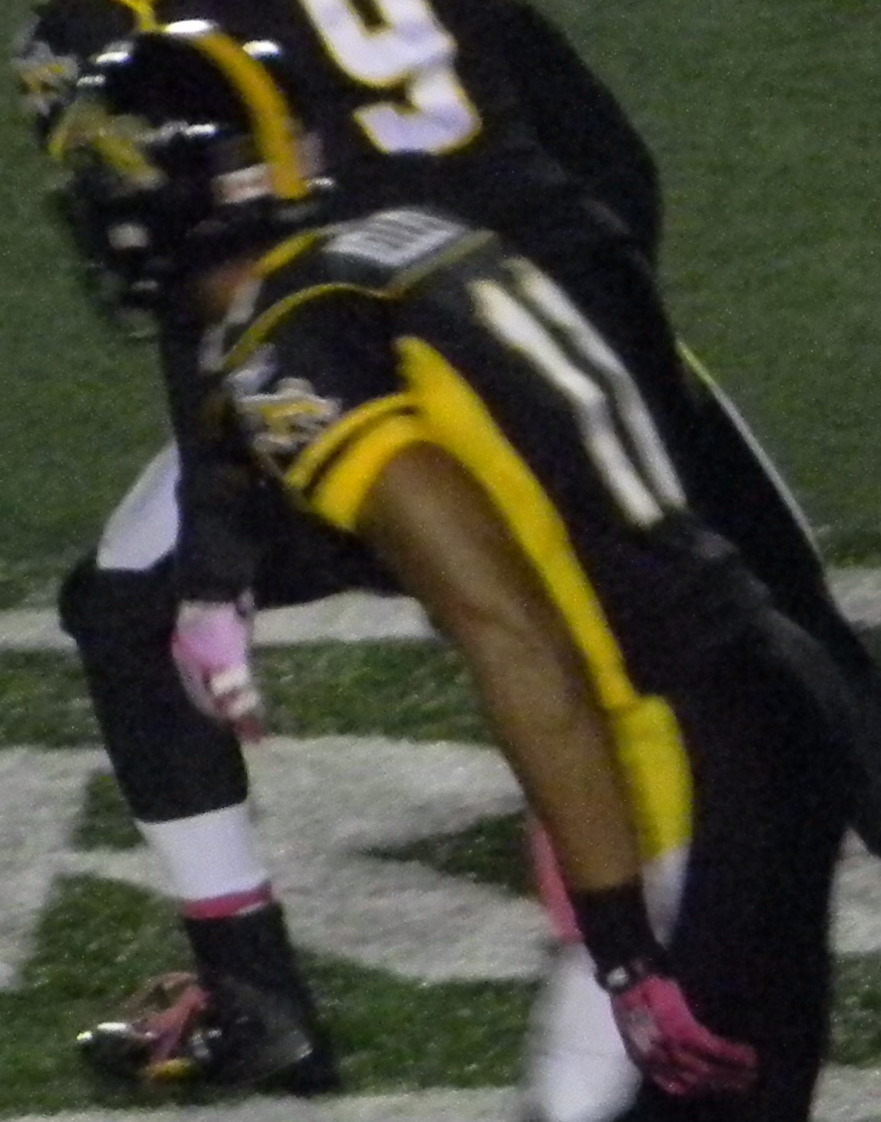
- Kelley with the Hamilton Tiger-Cats in 2011

No. 11, 2, 84, 87, 88
- Position: Wide receiver

Personal information
- Born: June 9, 1988 (age 38); West Seneca, New York, U.S.
- Listed height: 6 ft 6 in (1.98 m)
- Listed weight: 231 lb (105 kg)

Career information
- High school: West Seneca (NY)
- College: Maine
- NFL draft: 2010: undrafted

Career history

Playing
- Hamilton Tiger-Cats (2011); Utah Blaze (2012); Jacksonville Sharks (2013)*; Indianapolis Colts (2013)*; Pittsburgh Power (2014); San Jose SaberCats (2015); Denver Broncos (2015)*; Chicago Bears (2015)*; Hudson Valley Fort (2015); Saskatchewan Roughriders (2016)
- * Offseason or practice squad member only

Operations
- Buffalo Bills, Alumni Relations (2017 - current)

Career CFL statistics
- Receptions: 2
- Receiving yards: 15
- Receiving average: 7.5
- Receiving TDs: 0

Career AFL statistics
- Receptions: 37
- Receiving yards: 455
- Receiving average: 12.3
- Receiving TDs: 11
- Stats at ArenaFan.com
- Stats at Pro Football Reference

Jeremy Kelley (born June 9, 1988) is an American former football wide receiver. He attended the University of Maine. Kelley was a member of the Hamilton Tiger-Cats, Utah Blaze, Jacksonville Sharks, Indianapolis Colts, Pittsburgh Power, San Jose SaberCats, Denver Broncos, Chicago Bears, Hudson Valley Fort and Saskatchewan Roughriders.

== College career ==
After graduating from West Seneca West High School, Kelley attended the University of Maine where he made contributions both on offense as a wide receiver, defense as a defensive end, while also service as a special teams captain. Throughout his college career, Kelley totaled 8 receptions for 64 yards, and 1 touchdown.

== Professional career ==
=== Hamilton Tiger-Cats ===
Kelley's first stint playing professional football saw limited action playing for the Canadian Football League's Hamilton Tiger-Cats. In his only season, Kelley contributed 15 yards receiving and proved to be a force on special teams, contributing in numerous ways. While also recording one blocked punt. The Tiger-Cats finished with an 8–10 record.

=== Utah Blaze ===
Though limited information is available, the media has attributed Kelley's best statistical numbers of his collegiate or professional career to his time spent with the Utah Blaze in 2012. Appearing in 8 games, Kelley recorded 19 receptions for 231 yards, and an astounding 7 touchdown receptions. Kelley was recognized as the AFL Player of the Week, for his performance on June 9, 2012, vs. Cleveland Gladiators.

=== Jacksonville Sharks ===
Following the 2012 Arena Football League season, Kelley's contractual rights were assigned to the Jacksonville Sharks. Due to his gained interest from the NFL's Indianapolis Colts, Kelley hoped to not participate in the Sharks' 2013 season. However, the Sharks maintained his rights among AFL teams.

=== Indianapolis Colts ===
On January 30, 2013, Kelley signed a "reserve/futures" contract with the National Football League's Indianapolis Colts promising him an invitation to the Colts' training camp and an opportunity to compete in the off-season for a position on the 53-man roster.

=== Pittsburgh Power ===
On June 25, 2014, Kelley was signed by the Pittsburgh Power of the Arena Football League.

=== San Jose SaberCats ===
On September 29, 2014, Kelley was assigned to the San Jose SaberCats for the 2015 season. Upon his arrival, Kelley's presence was welcomed on an already successful roster. Kelley averaged 12.4 yards per rec, his best performance came in a win vs. LA Kiss, June 5, 2015. Kelley recorded 6 rec, 123 yds, 1 TD. On July 31, 2015, Kelley was placed on reassignment, as he was signed by the Chicago Bears. Kelley was recognized as a member of the Sabrecats 2015 Arena Bowl Championship.

=== Denver Broncos ===
On December 30, 2014, Kelley was signed to a Reserve/Future contract by the Denver Broncos. He was released by the Broncos on May 4, 2015, due to medical circumstances.

=== Chicago Bears ===
Kelley signed with the Chicago Bears on August 15, 2015. He was released by the Bears on August 30, 2015.

=== Saskatchewan Roughriders ===
On February 9, 2016, Kelley signed with the Saskatchewan Roughriders. He retired during that same off-season, "due to a non-football-related medical situation that surfaced."
