= Eaton Site =

- U.S. National Register of Historic Places
- Location: Address Restricted, West Seneca, New York
- NRHP reference No.: 79001581
- Added to NRHP: April 03, 1979

Eaton Site is a historic archeological site located at West Seneca in Erie County, New York. It contains a record of small, intermittently occupied campsites from the Early Archaic (c. 8000 BC) though the Late Woodland (c. 1200 AD) periods and an Iroquoian settlement, thought to be Erie, dating to around 1550 AD. The site also contains materials from the early 19th century, when it was part of the Buffalo Creek Reservation, and traces of late 19th and 20th century materials. The land was sold in 1842 and the site was used as farmland until the early 1950s.

It was listed on the National Register of Historic Places in 1979.
