= Shaun Dolac =

American football player (born 2001)

No. 56 – Los Angeles Rams
- Position: Inside linebacker
- Roster status: Active

Personal information
- Born: September 14, 2001 (age 25); West Seneca, New York, U.S.
- Listed height: 6 ft 1 in (1.85 m)
- Listed weight: 222 lb (101 kg)

Career information
- High school: West Seneca East Senior
- College: Buffalo (2020–2024)
- NFL draft: 2025: undrafted

Career history
- Los Angeles Rams (2025–present)

Awards and highlights
- Consensus All-American (2024); MAC Defensive Player of the Year (2024); 2× First-team All-MAC (2022, 2024)

Career NFL statistics as of Week 5, 2026
- Total tackles: 37
- Stats at Pro Football Reference

Shaun W. Dolac (born September 14, 2001) is an American professional football inside linebacker for the Los Angeles Rams of the National Football League (NFL). He played college football for the Buffalo Bulls.

== Early life ==
Dolac graduated from West Seneca East Senior High School in West Seneca, New York, where he was nominated for the Connolly Cup, and then spent one year at Milford Academy. He committed to playing college football for the Buffalo Bulls, joining the team as a preferred walk-on.

== College career ==
In his first two collegiate seasons at the University at Buffalo in 2020 and 2021, Dolac recorded 44 tackles with six and a half being for a loss, and a sack and a half in 19 games. He had a breakout 2022 season, where he totaled 147 tackles with 14 being for a loss, four and a half sacks, seven pass deflections, and three forced fumbles, en route to being named first-team all-Mid-American Conference (MAC). In 2023, Dolac played in just four games due to a season-ending injury, finishing with 32 tackles, with three being for a loss, and an interception. Following the season, Dolac chose to transfer to Utah State, but after the spring semester opted to return to Buffalo. Midway through the 2024 season, he was named a midseason All-American after leading the nation in tackles to that point. After the regular season, he was named a Consensus All-American. He was the first player in school history to be named to the first team by the Associated Press, The Sporting News or the Walter Camp Football Foundation. After a win in the 2025 Bahamas Bowl, he finished the season with a school-record 168 total tackles. His total tackles and 177 interception return yards also led the NCAA Division I Football Bowl Subdivision.

== Professional career ==
Pre-draft measurables
Height	Weight	Arm length	Hand span	Wingspan	40-yard dash	10-yard split	20-yard split	20-yard shuttle	Three-cone drill	Vertical jump	Broad jump	Bench press
6 ft 0 1/4 in (1.84 m)	221 lb (100 kg)	30 in (0.76 m)	9 3/8 in (0.24 m)	6 ft 2 3/8 in (1.89 m)	4.63 s	1.53 s	2.69 s	4.22 s	6.93 s	35.5 in (0.90 m)	10 ft 1 in (3.07 m)	25 reps
All values from Pro Day

Dolac was not invited to participate in the Senior Bowl or the NFL Scouting Combine, possibly because he was considered undersized for his position.

Dolac signed with the Los Angeles Rams as an undrafted free agent on April 28, 2025. Dolac recorded 14 tackles in the team's first two preseason games and made the 53-man active roster to start the season. He made his NFL debut in the team's season opener against the Houston Texans on special teams. Dolac's first career tackle came on a punt return by Jaylin Noel in the second quarter. He played on defense for the first time in Week 6 against the Baltimore Ravens, and recorded seven tackles, including a tackle for loss on a Justice Hill carry. Dolac played in all 17 of Los Angeles' regular season contests during his rookie campaign, recording 25 combined tackles while playing primarily on special teams. On January 6, 2026, Dolac was placed on injured reserve due to a PCL injury suffered in the team's Week 18 contest against the Arizona Cardinals.

== Career statistics ==
=== NFL ===
Legend

Year	Team	Games		Tackles					Interceptions						Fumbles				
Year	Team	GP	GS	Cmb	Solo	Ast	Sck	TFL	Int	Yds	Avg	Lng	TD	PD	FF	Fum	FR	Yds	TD
2025	LAR	17	0	25	16	9	0.0	2	0	0	0.0	0	0	0	0	0	0	0	0
2026	LAR	5	0	12	6	6	0.0	0	0	0	0.0	0	0	0	0	0	0	0	0
Career		22	0	37	22	15	0.0	2	0	0	0.0	0	0	0	0	0	0	0	0

=== College ===
Year	Team	GP	Tackles						Interceptions			Fumbles			Kick
Year	Team	GP	Solo	Ast	Cmb	TfL	Sck	Yds	Int	Yds	PD	FR	Yds	FF	Blk
2020	Buffalo	7	6	1	7	0	0	0	0	0	0	0	0	0	0
2021	Buffalo	12	20	17	37	6	1.5	9	0	0	0	0	0	0	1
2022	Buffalo	13	97	50	147	13.5	4.5	29	0	0	7	0	0	3	0
2023	Buffalo	4	17	15	32	2.5	0	0	1	32	0	0	0	0	0
2024	Buffalo	13	82	86	168	19	6.5	30	5	177	5	0	0	0	0
Career		49	222	169	391	42	12.5	68	6	209	12	0	0	3	1

== Personal life ==
Dolac is Christian and has four siblings. His father died of esophageal cancer in 2016.

== See also ==
- List of NCAA major college football yearly tackles leaders
