= Most Likely to Survive =

2013 TBI Survivor memoir by Joe Kirchmyer, Matthew Faulkner

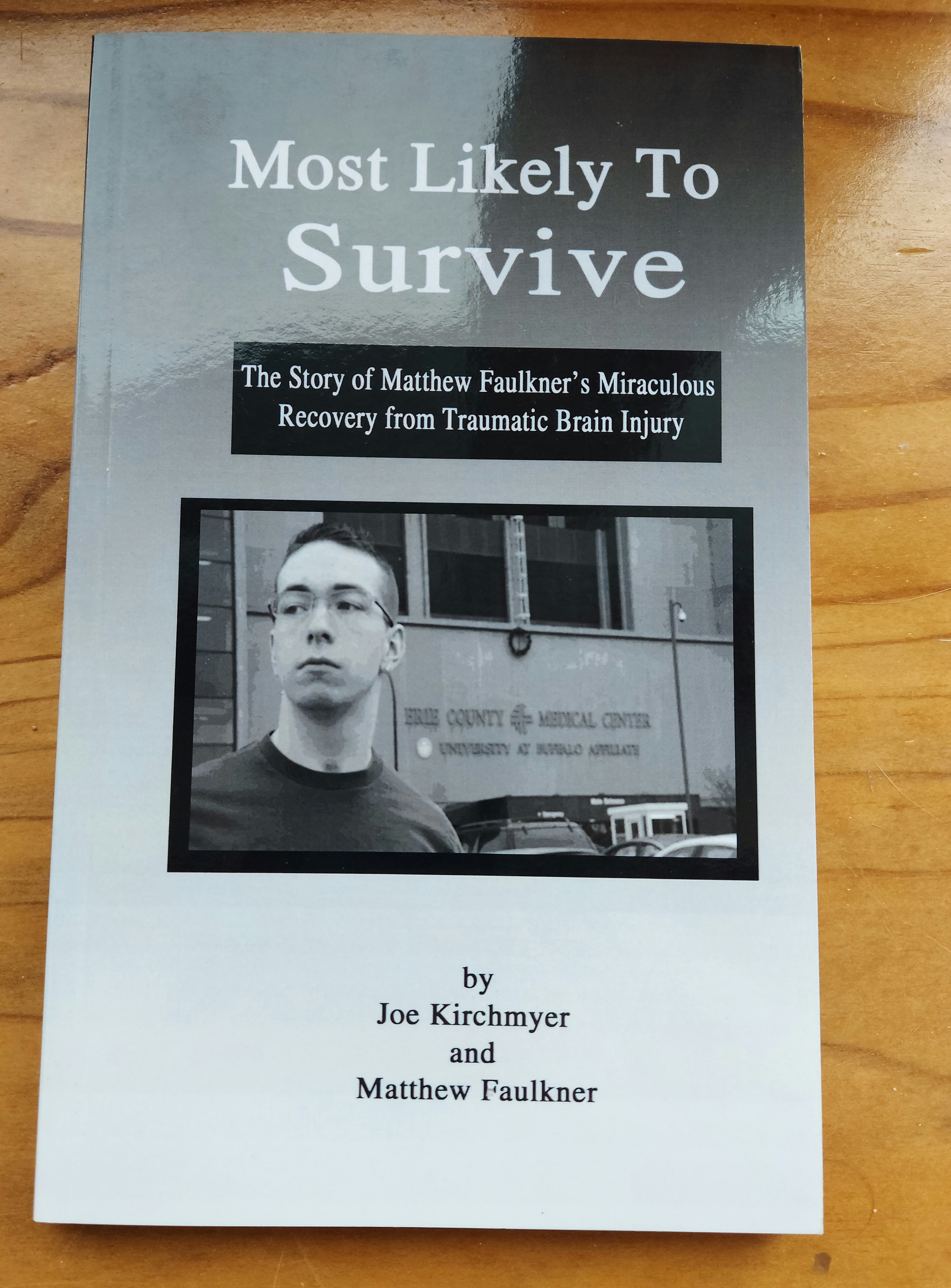
- Cover
- Author: Joseph Kirchmyer, and Matthew Faulkner
- Language: English
- Genre: Memoir; TBI Survivor
- Publisher: No Frills Buffalo
- Publication date: 31 January 2013 (Paperback); 8 April 2013 (Kindle)
- Publication place: United States
- Pages: 140
- ISBN: 978-0615759739

Most Likely to Survive: The Story of Matthew Faulkner's Miraculous Recovery from Traumatic Brain Injury is a non-fiction work written by Joe Kirchmyer and the book's subject, Matt Faulkner. The book was released in March 2013 and details a car accident in which Faulkner was a passenger. This occurred just a few months prior to his graduation from West Seneca West Senior High School (WSW) in 2009. Faulkner suffered from a severe traumatic brain injury (TBI) which left him in a coma for nearly two months. He spent three weeks on life support in the ICU at the Erie County Medical Center. He walked out of the hospital after 103 days and then received his high school diploma from West Seneca West just 12 days later. The book's title is a reference to Faulkner being named "Most Likely to Succeed" by his high school graduating class shortly before the accident.

== Premise ==
The book details Faulkner's life leading up to the accident, including his family life and having earned a place in the top ten percent of his high school graduating class, as well as admission to the all-college honors program at Canisius College^{[1]}. A large majority of the book covers his hospitalization, rehabilitation, and his life in the years after the injury, including starting school at Canisius College in Buffalo, New York, and working towards his college graduation in 2013.

The book closes with a personal note from Faulkner about his aspirations for a new approach to TBI rehabilitation, including "our society to reach some type of recognition that brain injury does happen, and that we need to do more for the victims, especially the young people who suffer from such an awful occurrence." He goes on to establish his ambition of seeing better TBI rehabilitation and outcomes.

== Release ==
On March 23, 2013, the book was released with the documentary film, Recovery, at the University at Buffalo (UB) Center for the Arts^{[5]}. Prior to the release of the book and documentary film, Faulkner was interviewed by Melissa Holmes of WGRZ, a local news station in Buffalo, NY.
