= Charles E. Burchfield =

American painter (1893–1967)

- July Evening
- Born: Charles Ephraim Burchfield; April 9, 1893; Ashtabula Harbor, Ohio, U.S.
- Died: January 10, 1967 (aged 73); West Seneca, New York, U.S.
- Education: Cleveland School of Art
- Known for: Watercolor painting
- Movement: Cleveland School, American Scene painting
- Children: Martha Elizabeth Burchfield Richter

Charles Ephraim Burchfield (April 9, 1893 – January 10, 1967) was an American painter and visionary artist, known for his passionate watercolors of nature scenes and townscapes. The largest collection of Burchfield's paintings, archives and journals are in the collection of the Burchfield Penney Art Center in Buffalo. His paintings are in the collections of more than 109 museums in the USA and have been the subject of exhibitions at the Metropolitan Museum of Art, the Whitney Museum of American Art, the Hammer Museum, and the Museum of Modern Art, as well as other prominent institutions.

== Life ==
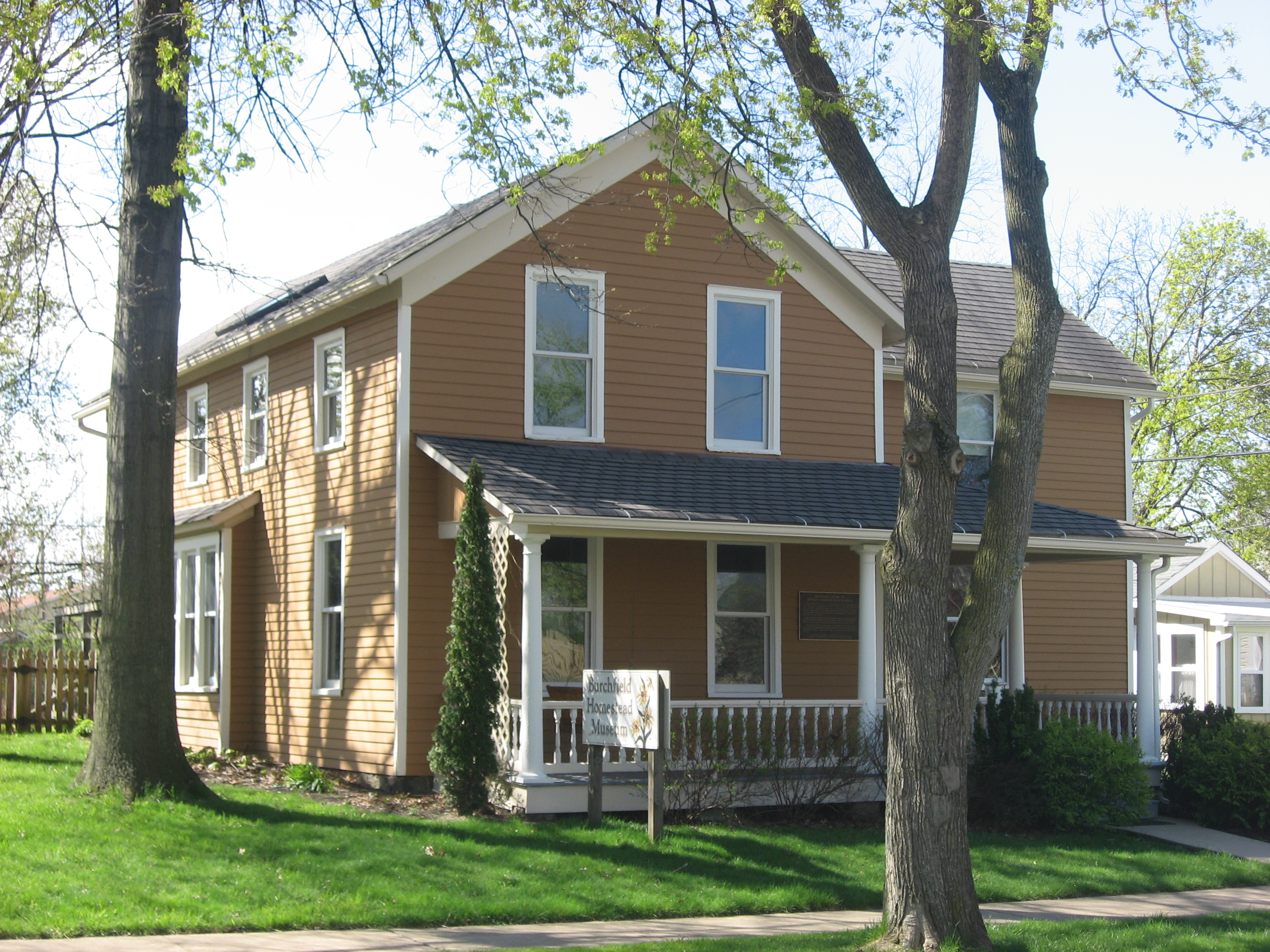
Burchfield's childhood home in Salem

Born in Ashtabula, Ohio, Burchfield was raised by his widowed mother in Salem, Ohio. Most of his early works were done at this house, where he lived from the ages of five to 28, and which has since been converted into a museum. While he did think of being a nature writer in high school, he eventually focused entirely on the visual aspect of his creativity, writing short descriptive pieces for the painting on the back of the mount. Stimulated by the nature descriptions of others, his preferred American writers were Thoreau and Willa Cather and later he developed a passion for reading works by Finnish writers describing nature.

Burchfield graduated from the Cleveland Institute of Art in 1916. Later in life he acknowledged the profound effect on his own development by a teacher at the CIA, the artist Henry Keller. Keller led a generation of Ohio watercolor painters of the Cleveland School which included Burchfield.

On becoming engaged, Burchfield moved to Buffalo, New York in 1921, where he was employed as a designer at the H.M. Birge wallpaper company. The following year he married Bertha Kenreich in Greenford, Ohio. In 1928 with a fifth child on the way, he approached artist-gallerist Frank Rehn to see whether he could afford to paint full-time by selling through the Rehn gallery in New York. Though the decision to leave Birge preceded the Great Depression, his work continued to sell. In 1952, he was elected to the National Academy of Design as an Associate member, and became a full member in 1954.

In 1925, Burchfield had moved from Buffalo to the adjacent suburb of West Seneca, New York, spending the rest of his life in the rural neighborhood of Gardenville. The Charles Burchfield Home and Studio located at 3574 Clinton Street served as his residence and creative workspace for 37 years, from 1925 until his death in 1967. The studio, built in 1928 and later moved to a concrete foundation in 1930, played a key role in his artistic process. This modest property, measuring 33 by 450 feet, was both a source of inspiration and a frequent subject in his artwork. He is buried in Oakwood Cemetery in the Village of East Aurora, New York.

== Work ==
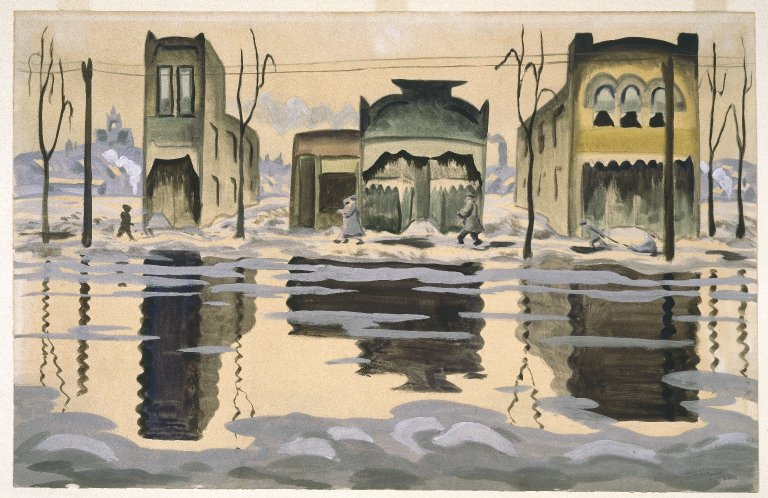
February Thaw, Brooklyn Museum

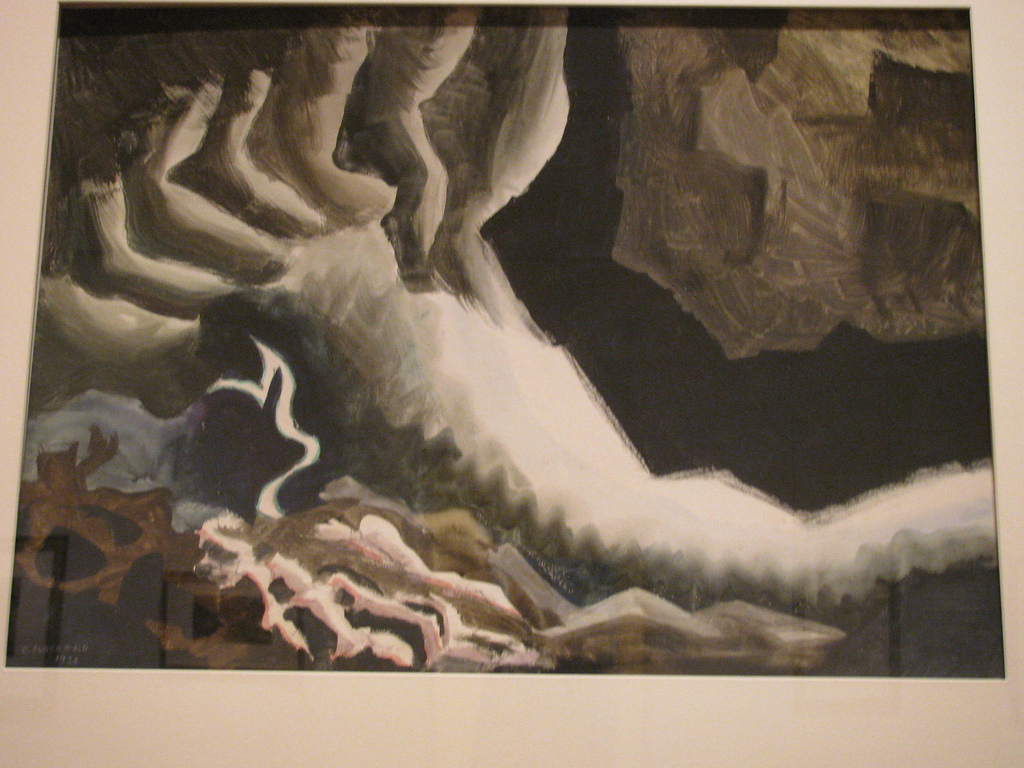
Lightning and Thunder at Night, Smithsonian American Art Museum

According to Burchfield's friend and colleague Edward Hopper, "The work of Charles Burchfield is most decidedly founded, not on art, but on life, and the life that he knows and loves best." Burchfield has been more recently described as "the mystic, cryptic painter of transcendental landscapes, trees with telekinetic halos, and haunted houses emanating ectoplasmic auras." Jerry Saltz suggests his influences as van Gogh, Caspar David Friedrich, Marsden Hartley, John Marin, "calendar art, and Sunday painting." Like Hopper, he seemed not to have been influenced by cubism.

== Process ==
Since its heyday in the nineteenth century, watercolor had remained a popular style, but Burchfield was unique among his major contemporaries for working exclusively within the medium. Unlike most watercolorists, he stood at an easel. He applied his colors with a "dry brush" technique (very little water) on machine-made paper, often reworking the surface during the process or sometimes many years later.

Burchfield was an unflagging advocate for the virtues of watercolors, and chafed at the popular misconception of them as fragile and impermanent. He was aware that some fading and hue changes were likely to occur, but believed that proper handling and display procedures would keep water-based artwork as vibrant as any other medium. Modern curators typically show watercolors like Burchfield's under reduced lighting and for shorter lengths of time than oil-based exhibitions.

== Art periods ==
His work is usually divided into three periods, comprising figuration; houses and small town scenes; and abstractions depicting moods (frequently morbid and fearful). Insect and frog sounds have their own calligraphic strokes, and cicada sounds are depicted with zigzag strokes radiating outward; flowers and houses seem to have faces, not always pleasant.

=== Early work ===
Woman in Doorway (1917), The Phillips Collection

Burchfield's style was largely developed by the summer of 1915, after his junior year at the Cleveland School of Art, as he sketched and painted constantly in and around Salem, Ohio, "gathering the materials for a lifetime", according to his journals. Exposed in school to modernist European trends, he developed an almost fauvist use of broad areas of simplified color. He was enlivened by delightful particularizations of nature, and in 1917, began combining visual motifs projecting human moods, often disturbing, into the pictures. Assigned to the camouflage unit in the Army in 1918, he even worked his designs into painting schemes disguising tanks and artificial hills. Biographers note his exposure to modernist trends and traditional Chinese painting while in art school but overlook that the hallucinatory quality in his work may be partly traced to an episode of nervous exhaustion in 1911. While a junior in high school, determined to record all the area's flowering plants that spring, he stayed up late at night, painting whole bouquets of the blooms, and had a bout of what was referred to at the time as "brain fever", which might now be termed mania. He seems to have learned to use it as a source of energy and inspiration, and his school transcript records only three days' absence that semester. Painting constantly from 1915, even while working full-time in summer and after college, he sketched on walks to and from home at lunchtime and completed paintings based on them at night. Half of his lifetime output of paintings was produced while living in Salem from 1915 to 1917. The fact that so many paintings of this period were depictions of scenes visible from the windows of his boyhood home prompted Henry Adams, curator of drawings at the Cleveland Museum of Art, to call it "the most important house in American art history."

=== Middle Work ===
In his middle period, from 1919 until 1943, prompted partly by the need to provide financially for his new family with salable pictures for the New York art market, he depicted small-town and industrial scenes that put him in the category of the American Scene or Regionalist movement. He was able to support himself through his painting from 1928, when he resigned his wallpaper design position at Birge & Co. in Buffalo, New York. These large paintings have a solid look unusual in watercolors, resembling oil paintings, and they are the works most often seen in art history texts. Though one critic commented that Burchfield was "Edward Hopper on a rainy day", a 1936 Life Magazine article named him one of America's 10 greatest painters.

=== Late Work ===
In his late period, from 1943 on, possibly facing a psychological crisis as he turned 50, he returned to the preoccupations of the early work, incorporating the painting skills he had mastered during his middle period (which he eventually saw as a "diversion" from his true path), developing large, hallucinatory renditions of nature captured in swirling strokes, heightened colors and exaggerated forms. In his writings he expressed an aim to depict an earlier era in the history of human consciousness when man saw gods and spirits in natural objects and forces. Art historian and critic John Canaday predicted in a 1966 review in The New York Times that the grandeur and power of these pictures would be Burchfield's enduring achievement.

== Legacy ==
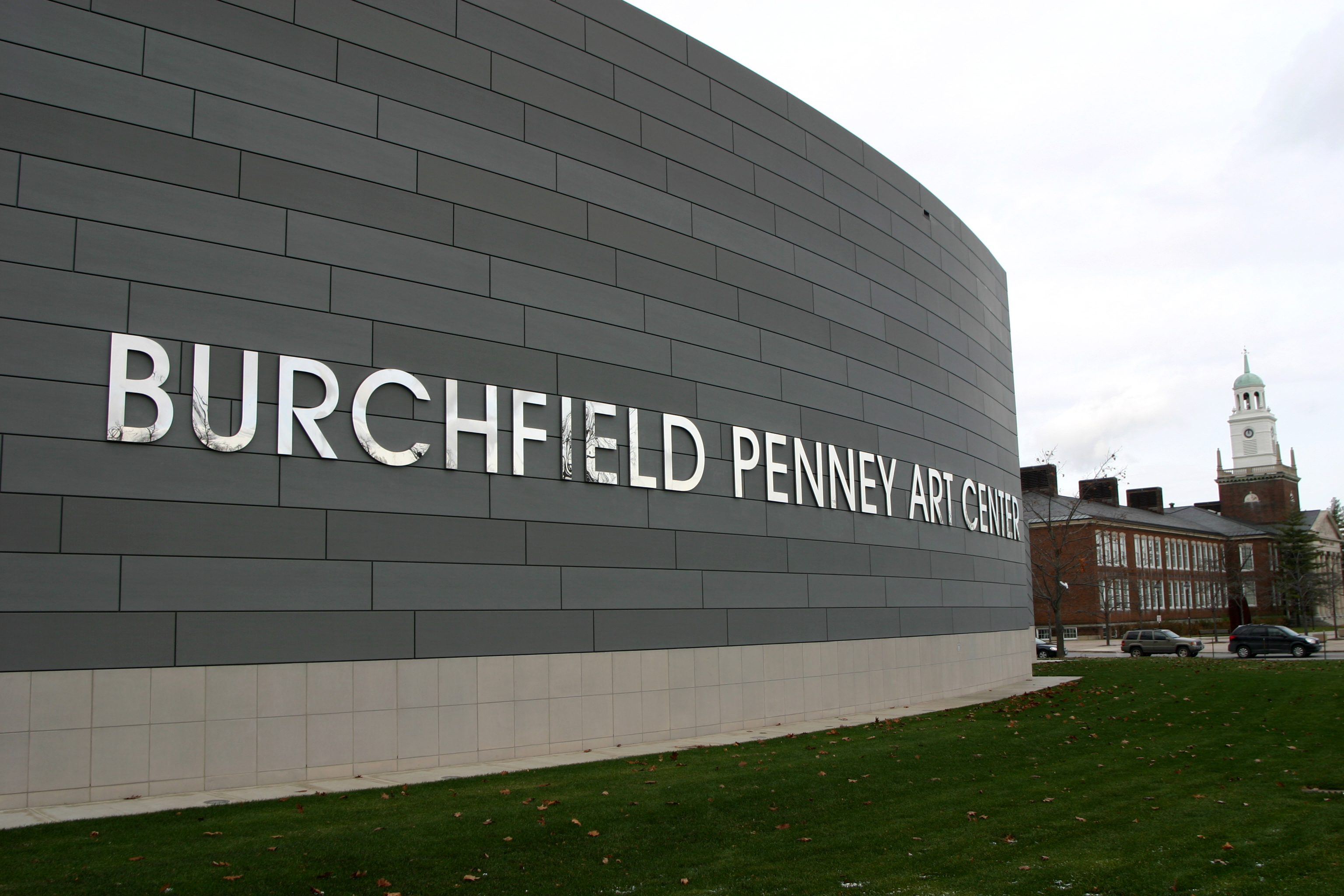
The Burchfield Penney Art Center

The Charles Burchfield Center at Buffalo State College was dedicated in his honor in 1966. It was renamed The Burchfield Art Center in 1983 with an expanded mission to support a multi-arts focus. Between 1991 and 1994, the museum received a series of gifts from Charles Rand Penney, Ph. D., of more than 1,300 works by Western New York artists. Included in that gift were 183 works by Charles E. Burchfield. In honor of such a substantial donation the museum was again renamed as The Burchfield Penney Art Center.

Charles Burchfield's home and studio, in Gardenville, both survive and are privately owned but opened periodically to the public. It acts as the host of the BurchFest arts festival. The Burchfield Penney Art Center also maintains a permanent re-creation of the studio.

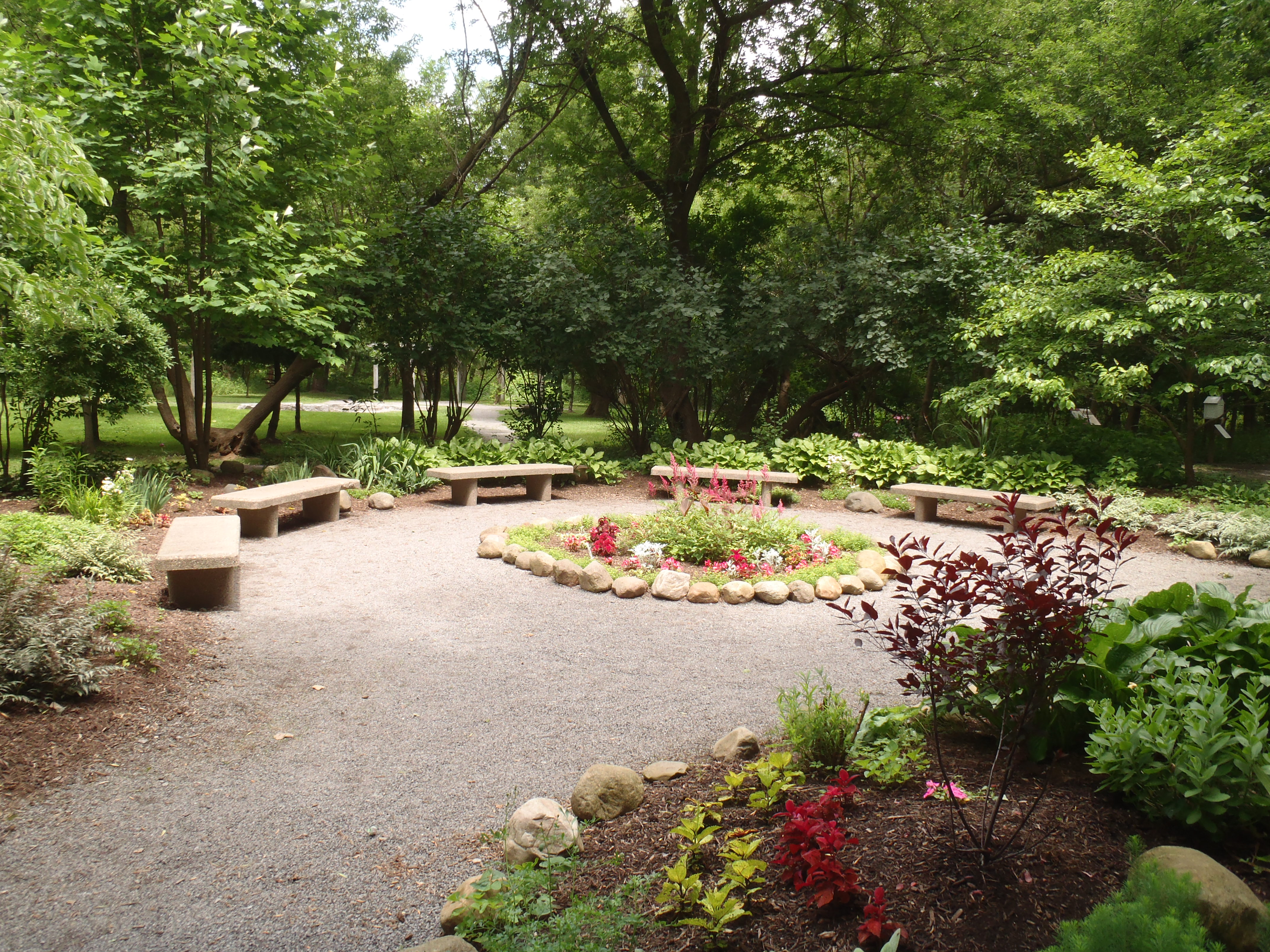
Garden along the Charles E. Burchfield Nature & Art Center

The Charles E. Burchfield Nature & Art Center in West Seneca, New York, is named in his honor. Developed in 1999, the 29 acre art and nature center complex also contains wild and cultivated gardens, a large playground, nature trails, playgrounds and an outdoor amphitheater alongside the banks of the Buffalo Creek.

Four of Burchfield's paintings cover author Marilynne Robinson's Gilead series.

Of his current legacy, Saltz writes that "Consciously or not, recent painters like Peter Doig, Verne Dawson, Gregory Amenoff, Kurt Lightner, and Ellen Altfest are channeling bits of Burchfield's visionary vibe."

From October 22, 2026, to January 31, 2027, the Whitney Museum of American Art presented Charles Burchfield: Elemental. The exhibit “include[s] early landscapes, meditations on the sky, and monumental ‘reconstructions’” and is drawn from the Museum’s collection.

== Collections ==
- Amon Carter Museum, Fort Worth, Texas
- Brauer Museum of Art, Valparaiso University
- Buffalo AKG Art Museum, Buffalo, New York
- Burchfield Penney Art Center, Buffalo State College, Buffalo, New York. The Burchfield Penney Art Center holds the world's largest collection of Charles E. Burchfield paintings, studio objects and Burchfield memorabilia.
- Butler Institute of American Art, Youngstown, Ohio
- Canton Museum of Art, Canton, Ohio
- Carnegie Museum of Art, Pittsburgh, Pennsylvania
- Cleveland Museum of Art, Cleveland, Ohio
- Columbus Museum of Art, Columbus, Ohio
- Detroit Institute of Arts, Detroit, Michigan
- Everson Museum of Art, Syracuse, New York
- Fine Arts Museums of San Francisco, San Francisco, California
- Hunter Museum of American Art, Chattanooga, Tennessee
- Kalamazoo Institute of Arts, Kalamazoo, Michigan
- Lehigh University Art Galleries, Bethlehem, Pennsylvania
- Madison Museum of Contemporary Art, Madison, Wisconsin
- Memphis Brooks Museum of Art, Memphis, Tennessee
- Metropolitan Museum of Art, New York, New York
- Minneapolis Institute of Art, Minneapolis, Minnesota
- Munson-Williams-Proctor Arts Institute, Utica, New York
- Museum of Modern Art, New York, New York
- North Carolina Museum of Art, Raleigh, North Carolina
- The Phillips Collection, Washington, D.C.
- Reynolda House Museum of American Art, Winston-Salem, North Carolina
- Philadelphia Museum of Art, Philadelphia, Pennsylvania
- Thyssen-Bornemisza Museum, Madrid, Spain
- Smithsonian American Art Museum, Washington, DC
- Vero Beach Museum of Art, Vero Beach, Florida
- Virginia Museum of Fine Arts, Richmond, Virginia
- Wadsworth Atheneum, Hartford, Connecticut
- Wellin Museum of Art (Hamilton College), Clinton, New York
- Whitney Museum of American Art, New York, New York
