= West Seneca Central School District =

School district in the U.S. state of New York

Location
- Erie County West Seneca, New York United States

District information
- Type: Public
- Grades: K-12
- Established: 1946
- Superintendent: Lisa Krueger
- Schools: 9
- NCES District ID: 3630780

Students and staff
- Students: 6,100 (2021–22)
- Teachers: 520.90 (on an FTE basis)
- Student–teacher ratio: 14.39
- Athletic conference: Section VI

Other information
- Website: http://www.wscschools.org/

The West Seneca Central School District is the third largest central school district in Western New York, and one of the largest school districts in New York State. It serves 25 square miles (65 km^{2}), including a majority of the town of West Seneca, and portions of the towns of Cheektowaga, Orchard Park, and Hamburg. It was centralized in 1946.

== Schools ==
=== High schools ===
West Seneca East Senior High School is located at 4760 Seneca Street and serves grades 9–12. The principal is Jason Winnicki.

West Seneca West Senior High School is located at 3330 Seneca Street and serves grades 9–12. The principal is Jay Brinker.

=== Middle schools ===
East Middle School serves grades 6-8 and is located at 1445 Center Road. The principal is Jason Marchioli. Assistant principal is Erin Farley.

West Middle School is located at 395 Center Road, and serves grades 6–8. The principal is David Kean.

=== Elementary schools ===
- Allendale Elementary School (Grades K-5) (Built in 1954) Cornerstone laid on January 9, 1955, with 1954 inscribed on it. Opened on September 12, 1955, and dedicated on January 20, 1957
- Clinton Elementary School (Grades K-5) (Built in 1967) Opened on September 25, 1967
- Northwood Elementary School (Grades K-5) (Built in 1970) Opened in September 1970
- West Elementary School (Grades K-5)
- Winchester Potters Elementary School (Grades K-5) (Built in 1967 as Potters Rd. Elementary School) Opened on January 1, 1968

=== Closed schools ===
- Allendale Junior High School (Built in 1973 with the cornerstone being laid at the dedication on November 2, 1973) Became the West Seneca Central Education Center on June 9, 1987, and is currently West Elementary School as of July 6, 1999
- East Elementary School (Grades K–6, closed June 2013)
- Winchester Elementary School (Grades K–5) Built in 1939 (cornerstone laid on March 26, 1939, and dedicated on November 29, 1939) as West Seneca District School No. 8. An addition was built and dedicated on May 5, 1957. Closed in June 2021
- Alternative Learning Center (Grades 9–12, closed June 2013)
- Ebenezer School (High school, then became elementary. Current building for district offices. Built in 1921 as Ebenezer School District No. 1)
- Reserve Elementary School (Grades K-5. Built in 1964, fire destroyed building)
- Bellwood School (Original West Seneca High school until 1949, then became elementary) (Built 1912, Closed 1982, Partially Demolished)
- Gardenville School (High school until 1949 then became elementary. Built 1924, Closed 1981, Demolished 1995)
- Abbott Road Elementary (Grades K-5. Joined district in 1963)
