= West Seneca East Senior High School =

Location
- 4760 Seneca Street; West Seneca, New York 14224; United States; 42°49′52″N 78°43′37″W

Information
- Type: Public
- Established: 1969
- School district: West Seneca Central School District
- Principal: Jason R. Winnicki
- Faculty: 68.17 (on an FTE basis)
- Grades: 9-12
- Enrollment: 775 (2023–24)
- Color
- Website: www.wscschools.org/Domain/1006

West Seneca East Senior High is a public, co-educational high school in the West Seneca Central School District and serves grades nine through twelve. It is accredited by the New York State Board of Regents.

== Students ==
In the 2005-2006 school year, there were 1088 students enrolled in the high school. The average class size is 20 students with a total of 73 teachers.

52% of students graduated in the 2005-2006 school year, 53% went on to a four-year college, 38% went on to a two-year college, 2% went to another post secondary school, 1% went to the military and 4% went on to employment.

== History ==
West Seneca East Senior High opened on February 5, 1970. The need for a new senior high was paramount due to the use of split sessions - one in the morning and one in the afternoon.

== Notable alumni ==
- Jordan Buckley - guitarist of hardcore band Every Time I Die
- Keith Buckley - lead singer of hardcore band Every Time I Die
- Shaun Dolac - linebacker for the Los Angeles Rams
- Wilson Greatbatch - engineer and inventor; held more than 350 patents; member of the National Inventors Hall of Fame; recipient of the Lemelson–MIT Prize; his most notable invention is the pacemaker
- Robby Takac - bassist for the Goo Goo Dolls
- Mike Terrana - drummer in Europe; recorded with 31 artists on 52 discs; most recently toured with Masterplan and Tarja Turunen
- Pepper Parks - professional wrestler who is most commonly known for wrestling in All Elite Wrestling (AEW) under the name “The Blade”
