= West Seneca (CDP), New York =

West Seneca, New York
- Census-designated place
- Location in Erie County and the state of New York
- Coordinates: 42°50′21″N 78°45′39″W
- Country: United States
- State: New York
- County: Erie
- Town: West Seneca

Area
  - Total: 21.44 sq mi (55.53 km^{2})
  - Land: 21.39 sq mi (55.39 km^{2})
  - Water: 0.054 sq mi (0.14 km^{2})
- Elevation: 597 ft (182 m)

Population (2020)
  - Total: 45,500
  - Density: 2,127.5/sq mi (821.43/km^{2})
- Time zone: UTC-5 (Eastern (EST))
  - Summer (DST): UTC-4 (EDT)
- ZIP Codes: 14224, 14218, 14206, 14210 (West Seneca); 14220 (Buffalo); 14227 (Cheektowaga)
- Area code: 716
- FIPS code: 36-80907
- GNIS feature ID: 0971949

Historical population
| Census | Pop. | Note | %± |
|---|---|---|---|
| 2010 | 44,711 | | — |
| 2020 | 45,500 | | 1.8% |
U.S. Decennial Census

West Seneca is a hamlet and census-designated place (CDP) in Erie County, New York, United States. The population was 44,711 at the 2010 census. It is part of the Buffalo-Niagara Falls metropolitan area. The CDP corresponds exactly to the area of the town of West Seneca.

== Geography ==
According to the United States Census Bureau, the CDP has a total area of 21.4 square miles (55.5 km^{2}), of which 21.4 square miles (55.3 km^{2}) is land and 0.06 square miles (0.15 km^{2}), or 0.27%, is water.

== Demographics ==
At the 2000 census there were 45,943 people, 18,337 households, and 12,744 families living in the CDP. The population density was 2,148.6 inhabitants per square mile (829.6/km^{2}). There were 18,993 housing units at an average density of 888.2 per square mile (342.9/km^{2}). The racial makeup of the CDP was 98.11% White, 0.46% Black or African American, 0.17% Native American, 0.50% Asian, 0.01% Pacific Islander, 0.19% from other races, and 0.56% from two or more races. Hispanic or Latino of any race were 0.88%.

Of the 18,337 households 28.2% had children under the age of 18 living with them, 56.2% were married couples living together, 10.3% had a female householder with no husband present, and 30.5% were non-families. 26.6% of households were one person and 13.1% were one person aged 65 or older. The average household size was 2.47 and the average family size was 3.02.

The age distribution was 22.3% under the age of 18, 6.9% from 18 to 24, 27.2% from 25 to 44, 25.4% from 45 to 64, and 18.2% 65 or older. The median age was 41 years. For every 100 females, there were 91.0 males. For every 100 females age 18 and over, there were 88.3 males.

The median household income was $46,264 and the median family income was $54,164. Males had a median income of $39,003 versus $26,846 for females. The per capita income for the CDP was $20,529. About 3.0% of families and 4.6% of the population were below the poverty line, including 5.1% of those under age 18 and 4.7% of those age 65 or over.
