= Burchfield Homestead =

Historic house in Ohio, United States

- U.S. National Register of Historic Places
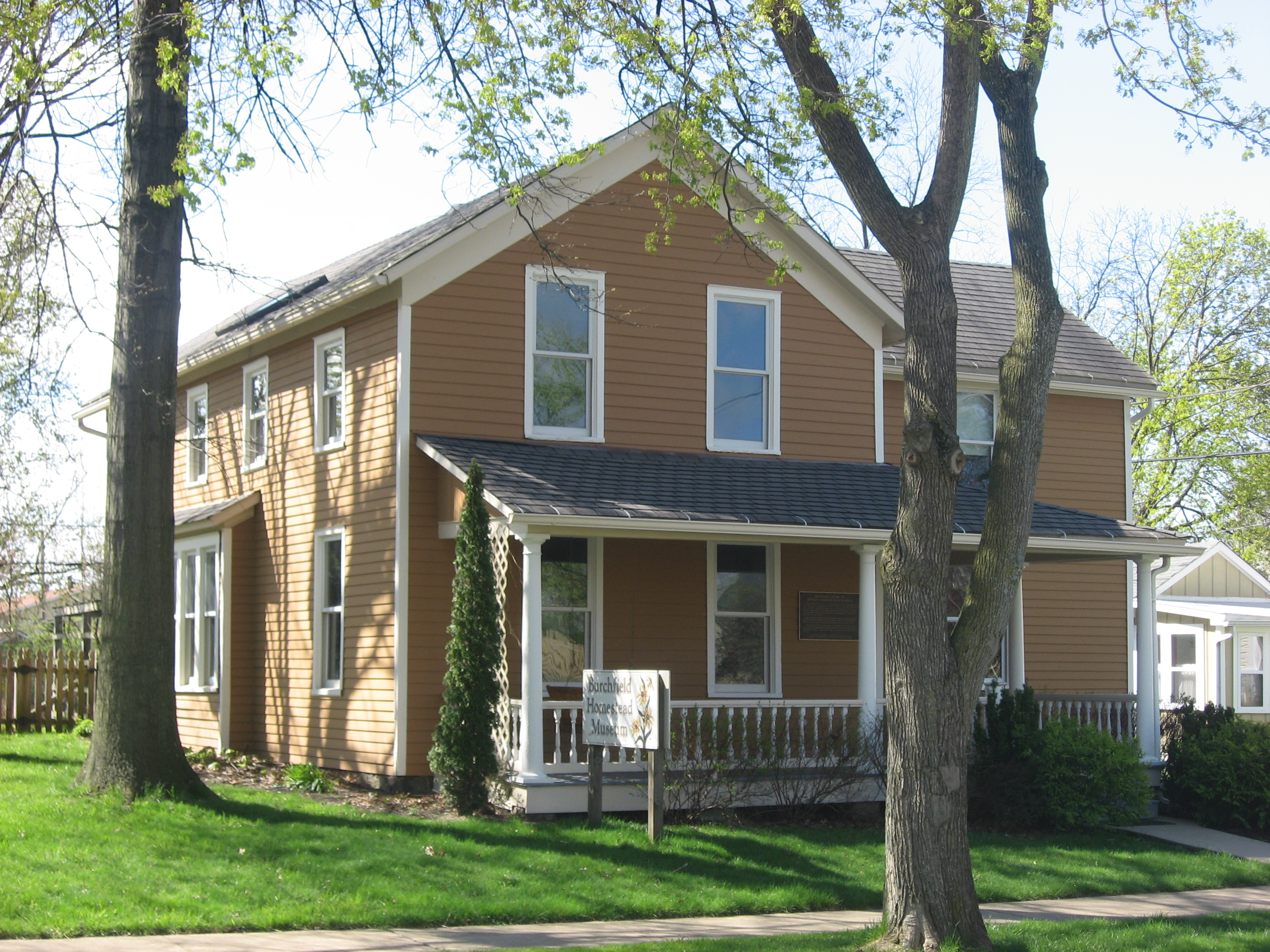
- Front of the house

- Location within Ohio Location within the United States
- Location: 867 E. Fourth St., Salem, Ohio
- Coordinates: 40°54′17″N 80°50′57″W
- Area: less than one acre
- Built: 1898
- Architectural style: Colonial Revival
- NRHP reference No.: 99000320
- Added to NRHP: March 23, 1999

The Burchfield Homestead was the boyhood home of Charles E. Burchfield. It is located in Salem, Ohio, and is listed on the National Register of Historic Places. Charles Burchfield was noted for his paintings of scenes in and around this home. Art historian Henry Adams, curator of American Art at the Cleveland Museum of Art, called the house "a building of extraordinary significance."

== Charles E. Burchfield ==
Charles Burchfield grew up in Salem, Ohio, and is considered one of America's premier watercolorists. He moved to upstate New York where his career and reputation as an artist flourished. The neighborhood and home in Salem where he was raised have not significantly changed since Burchfield lived there. The inspiration for many of his works were the scenes visible from the windows of the home.

== Burchfield Homestead Museum ==
In August 1999, the Burchfield Museum opened after years of fund-raising and construction to restore Burchfield's home.

The Burchfield Museum was placed on the National Register of Historical Places in April 1999.
