= West Seneca, New York =

West Seneca, New York Seneca
- Town
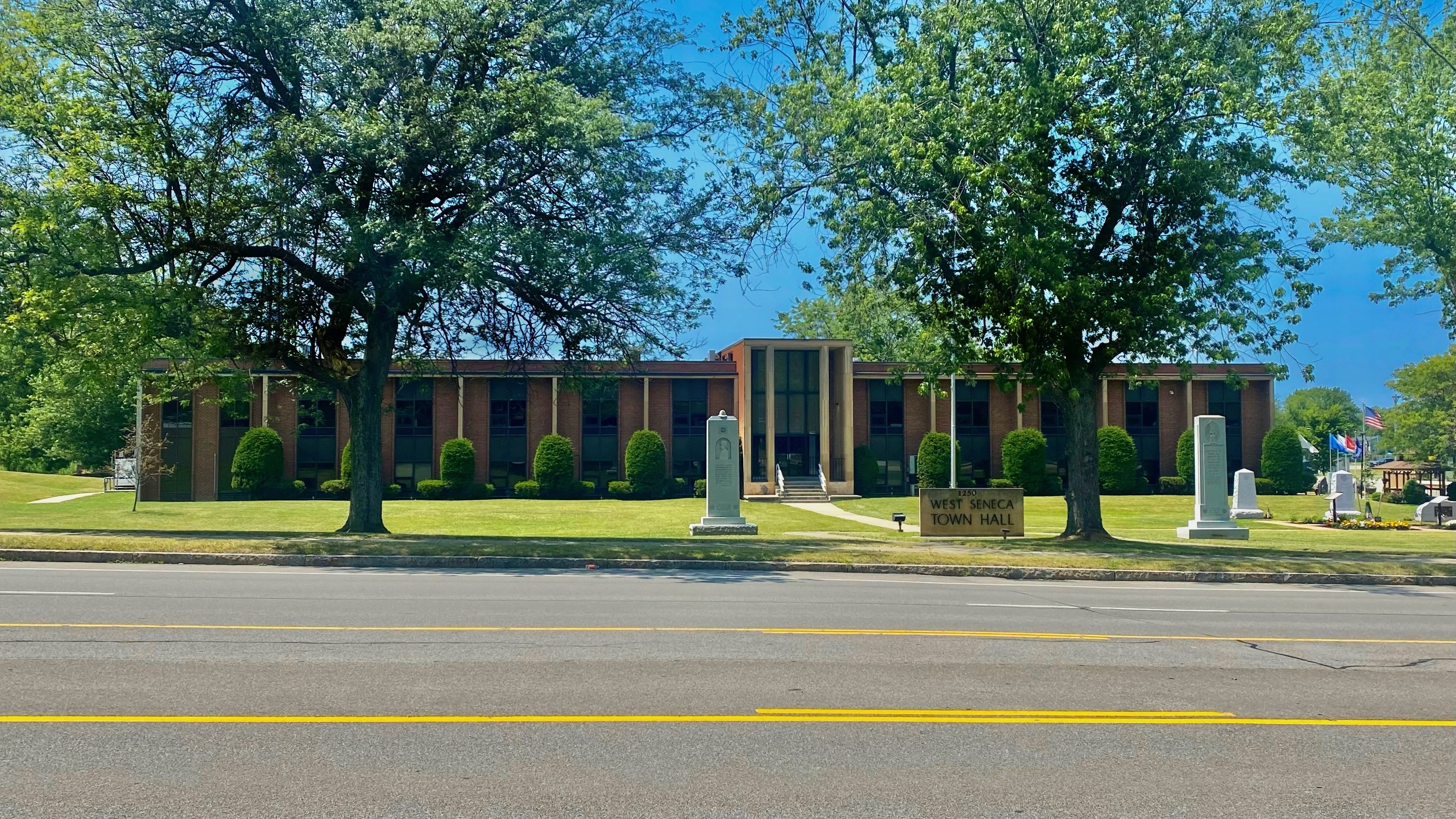
- West Seneca town hall, July 2022

- Flag Seal
- Motto: "Proud Past — Unlimited Future"
- Location in Erie County and the state of New York
- Coordinates: 42°50′21″N 78°45′39″W
- Country: United States
- State: New York
- County: Erie
- founded as the village of Ebenezer: 1842
- as Seneca: 1851
- as West Seneca: 1852
- Named for: Seneca Nation

Government
  - Type: town council
  - town supervisor: Gary A. Dickson (R)
  - town council: Members: Robert Bridenstein (R); Mary Sherman (R); Scott Robertson (R); Jeffrey A. Piekarec (R)
  - town justice: Members: Paul Michalek (D); Jonathan Minear (R)
  - town clerk: Kate Newton (R)

Area
  - Total: 21.41 sq mi (55.46 km^{2})
  - Land: 21.36 sq mi (55.31 km^{2})
  - Water: 0.058 sq mi (0.15 km^{2})
- Elevation: 643 ft (196 m)

Population (2020)
  - Total: 45,500 ▲
  - Density: 2,128.7/sq mi (821.89/km^{2})
- Time zone: UTC-5 (Eastern (EST))
  - Summer (DST): UTC-4 (EDT)
- ZIP Codes: 14224, 14218, 14206, 14210 (West Seneca); 14220 (Buffalo); 14227 (Cheektowaga)
- Area code: 716
- FIPS code: 36-029-80918
- GNIS feature ID: 0979626
- Website: www.westseneca.gov

West Seneca is a town in Erie County, New York, United States. The population was 45,500 at the 2020 census. West Seneca is a centrally located interior town of the county, and a suburb of Buffalo. West Seneca, Orchard Park and Hamburg form the inner "Southtowns", a cluster of middle-class suburban towns.

== History ==
Because the town is on land of the former Buffalo Creek Reservation, it was not open to European settlement until the mid-19th century.

In 1851, the town of Seneca was formed from parts of the towns of Cheektowaga and Hamburg. The town's name was to West Seneca in 1852 to avoid confusion with the town of Seneca in Ontario County, New York. In 1909 the area immediately south of Buffalo split from West Seneca, becoming the city of Lackawanna.

Following election day in 2019, the town elected a Republican town supervisor for the first time in 50 years and first town board member in 13 years, despite having a two-to-one Democrat to Republican ratio among registered voters (a Democrat running as an independent also ran in the supervisorial race).

The Eaton Site was listed on the National Register of Historic Places in 1979. The Community of True Inspiration Residence was listed in 2013.

== Geography ==
According to the United States Census Bureau, the town has a total area of 21.41 square miles (55.46 km^{2}), of which 21.36 square miles (55.32 km^{2}) is land and 0.06 square miles (0.15 km^{2}), or 0.27%, is water. Cazenovia Creek and the Buffalo River runs through the town

The New York State Thruway (Interstate 90) passes through the town and intersects New York State Route 400 (Aurora Expressway) in the northwestern part of the town and U.S. Route 219 in the southwestern section. The east town line is marked by New York State Route 78 (Transit Road). New York State Route 240 (Harlem Road/Orchard Park Road) and New York State Route 277 (Union Road) are other major north-south roads, while New York State Route 16 (Seneca Street/Center Road) and New York State Route 354 (Clinton Street) are major east-west highways.

=== Adjacent cities and towns ===
- Town of Cheektowaga - north
- City of Buffalo - northwest
- City of Lackawanna - west
- Town of Orchard Park - south
- Town of Elma - east
- Town of Lancaster - northeast

=== Major highways in the Town of West Seneca ===
- Interstate 90 (New York State Thruway) passes through the western part of town in a north-south direction. (Overall Thruway direction is east-west.)
- U.S. Route 219 (Southern Expressway), north-south route that travels through the extreme southwestern corner of town and ends at I-90. It is a major traffic artery for Buffalo–Springville traffic and other points south.
- U.S. Route 20 (Transit Rd., Southwestern Blvd.), north-south route that forms the east town boundary as Transit Road, with NY 78 north of Seneca Street (NY 16) and without NY 78 north of the Orchard Park Border. US 20 then turns west along the Orchard Park border and forms the southern town border for a short while.
- New York State Route 16 (Seneca St., Center Rd.) passes through the town east-west from Buffalo into Elma. (Overall direction of NY 16 is north-south.)
- New York State Route 78 (Transit Rd.), north-south route that marks the east town line with US 20 north of Seneca Street (NY 16).
- New York State Route 240 (Harlem Rd., Orchard Park Rd.), north-south route through town from Cheektowaga to Orchard Park.
- New York State Route 277 (Union Rd.), north-south highway through town from Cheektowaga to Orchard Park.
- New York State Route 354 (Clinton St.), east-west roadway through north part of town from Buffalo to Elma.
- New York State Route 400 (Aurora Expwy.), east-west highway through the town from its west end at I-90, east into Elma that roughly parallels NY 16.

=== Communities and locations ===
- Buffalo Airfield (9G0) – A general aviation airport on the north town line.
- Buffalo Creek – A stream flowing westward through the town. The name of the city of Buffalo is derived from the stream. The creek is called the "Buffalo River" as it departs the western edge of the town.
- East Seneca – A location on Route 16 in the east part of the town.
- Ebenezer – Centrally located, a hamlet named after the Ebenezer Society (also called the Community of True Inspiration), a group of German Lutherans who purchased land and settled this area around 1843. Later, many of this communal group moved to Amana, Iowa, and had abandoned their four settlements in West Seneca by 1863.
- Gardenville – A hamlet on the northern border of the town shared with the town of Cheektowaga.
- New Ebenezer – A hamlet east of Gardenville.
- West Seneca Census-Designated Place – Census designation that corresponds to the entire town of West Seneca.

== Demographics ==
Historical population
Census	Pop.	Note	%±
1850	2,523		—
1860	2,784		10.3%
1870	3,196		14.8%
1880	3,463		8.4%
1890	3,485		0.6%
1900	5,363		53.9%
1910	4,605		−14.1%
1920	7,062		53.4%
1930	10,401		47.3%
1940	12,694		22.0%
1950	17,417		37.2%
1960	33,644		93.2%
1970	48,404		43.9%
1980	51,210		5.8%
1990	47,830		−6.6%
2000	45,920		−4.0%
2010	44,711		−2.6%
2020	45,500		1.8%
Historical Population Figures

As of the census of 2010, there were 44,711 people, 19,151 households, and 12,223 families residing in the town. The population density was 2,148.8 inhabitants per square mile (829.7/km^{2}). There were 18,982 housing units at an average density of 888.2 per square mile (342.9/km^{2}). The racial makeup of the town was 97.96% White, 0.85% Black or African American, 0.21% Native American, 0.62% Asian, 0.01% Pacific Islander, 0.29% from other races, and 0.77% from two or more races. Hispanic or Latino of any race were 1.67% of the population.

There were 19,151 households, out of which 28.2% had children under the age of 18 living with them, 56.2% were married couples living together, 10.3% had a female householder with no husband present, and 30.5% were non-families. 26.6% of all households were made up of individuals, and 13.1% had someone living alone who was 65 years of age or older. The average household size was 2.47 and the average family size was 3.02.

As of the census of 2000 the population was spread out, with 22.3% under the age of 18, 6.9% from 18 to 24, 27.2% from 25 to 44, 25.4% from 45 to 64, and 18.2% who were 65 years of age or older. The median age was 41 years. For every 100 females, there were 91.0 males. For every 100 females age 18 and over, there were 88.3 males.

The median income for a household in the town was $46,278, and the median income for a family was $54,179. Males had a median income of $39,003 versus $26,846 for females. The per capita income for the town was $20,529. About 3.0% of families and 4.6% of the population were below the poverty line, including 5.1% of those under age 18 and 4.7% of those age 65 or over.

== Attractions ==
The Charles E. Burchfield Nature & Art Center is located in West Seneca. Developed in 1999, the 29-acre (12 ha) art and nature center complex also contains wild and cultivated gardens, a large playground, nature trails, playgrounds, and an outdoor amphitheater alongside the banks of Buffalo Creek.

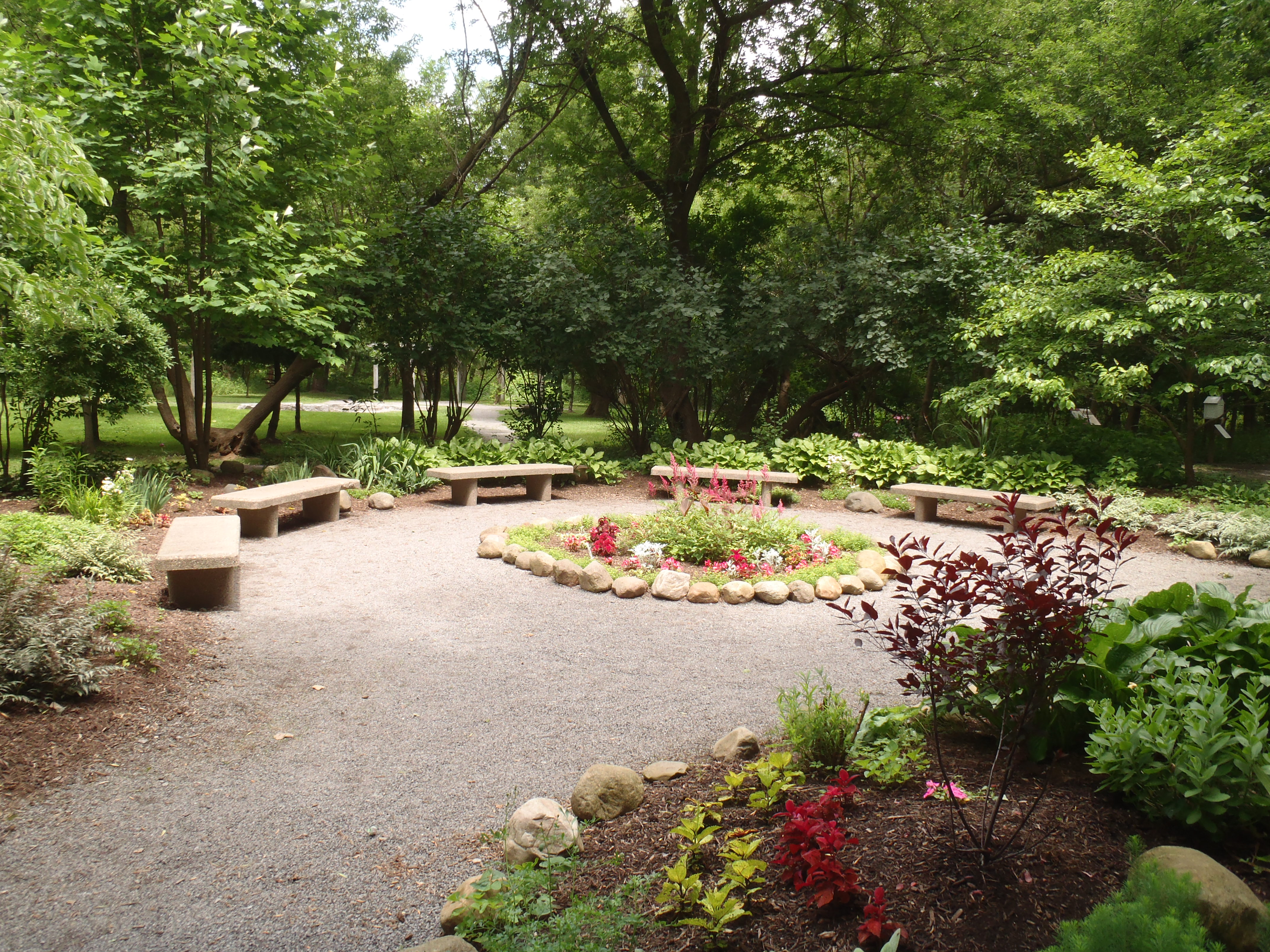
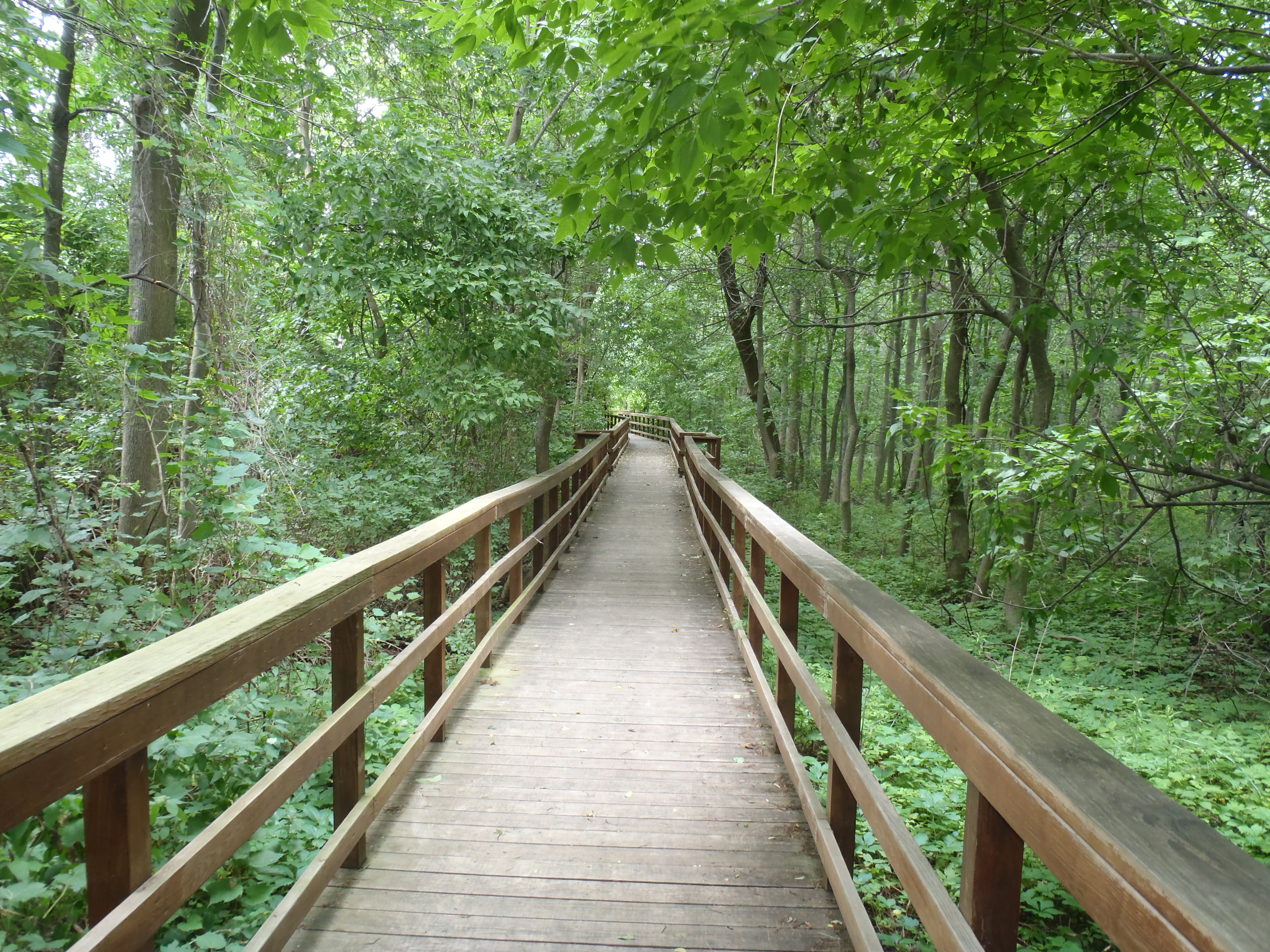
Garden and nature path within the Charles E. Burchfield Nature & Art Center]

The Charles Burchfield Home and Studio, located at 3574 Clinton Street in West Seneca, New York, served as the residence and creative workspace of renowned American watercolorist Charles E. Burchfield for 37 years, from 1925 until his death in 1967. Burchfield raised his family here, including artists Martha Burchfield Richter and Catherine Burchfield Parker, and painted many of his iconic landscapes and townscapes inspired by the surrounding environment. The studio, built in 1928 and later moved to a concrete foundation in 1930, played a key role in his artistic process. This modest property, measuring 33 by 450 feet, was both a source of inspiration and a frequent subject in his artwork.

Today, the property is privately owned by Alexander and Brittany Miller, who have undertaken extensive research and preservation efforts to restore the home and studio to their original condition, as depicted in Burchfield's paintings and journals. Their goal is to have the site recognized on the state and national registers of historic places. Visitors can explore a virtual tour of the property, offering a unique perspective on the spaces that influenced Burchfield's art.

The town was once home to one of the largest malls in the area, the Seneca Mall.

Schwabl's, a restaurant staple, has been located in West Seneca since 1837, known beef on weck, the restaurant was featured in a 2009 episode of Anthony Bourdain: No Reservations.

XGen Elite Sports Complex is home to the Buffalo eXtreme of the American Basketball Association.

== Education ==
There are three separate public school districts within the town. The West Seneca Central School District is the largest and serves the majority of the town. It also serves small portions of the southern parts of Cheektowaga, the northern portion of Orchard Park, and the northeastern portion of Hamburg Town. Portions of West Seneca are in Orchard Park Central School District and in Cheektowaga-Sloan Union Free School District.

West Seneca is home to the following private primary and secondary schools (Roman Catholic schools are affiliated with the Roman Catholic Diocese of Buffalo):

- Queen of Heaven School
- The Center Road Christian Academy,
- Trinity Christian School
- St. John Vianney School
- West Seneca Christian School

Former schools:

- Fourteen Holy Helpers School (closed June 27, 2014) - It had 20 employees and 136 students in January 2014.
- Our Lady of the Sacred Heart School (closed June 27, 2014; The school had its main building in the Orchard Park district and the junior high building in the West Seneca district, both physically in the town of Orchard Park near the Hamburg town and Lackawanna city lines.)

Houghton College used to have a branch campus in the town that also served as the central office for its extension studies program.

== Notable people ==
- Matt Anderson, professional volleyball player
- Jordan Buckley, Keith Buckley and Stephen Micciche of rock band Every Time I Die
- Charles E. Burchfield, painter and visionary artist who resided and built his only art studio at 3574 Clinton Street in West Seneca from 1925 to 1967
- Martha Elizabeth Burchfield Richter, American artist, daughter of renowned painter Charles E. Burchfield resided at 3574 Clinton Street West Seneca, NY
- Brian Daboll, head coach of the New York Giants of the NFL
- Vincent J. Graber Sr., former New York State Assemblyman
- Jeremy Kelley, NFL wide receiver
- Shaun Dolac, NFL linebacker - LA Rams
- Christian Metz, inspirationalist who helped found the hamlet of Ebenezer
- Aaron Miller, former NHL player who grew up in West Seneca
- Chris Mueller, NHL player who grew up in West Seneca
- Tina Parol, singer-songwriter
- Brian Roloff, professional hockey player
- Tim Russert, NBC journalist who attended elementary school in West Seneca
- Lee Stempniak, former NHL player who grew up in West Seneca
- Justin Strzelczyk, former NFL player who grew up in West Seneca
- Robby Takac, bassist for the Goo Goo Dolls
- Sandra Lee Wirth, former New York State Assemblywoman

== Gallery ==
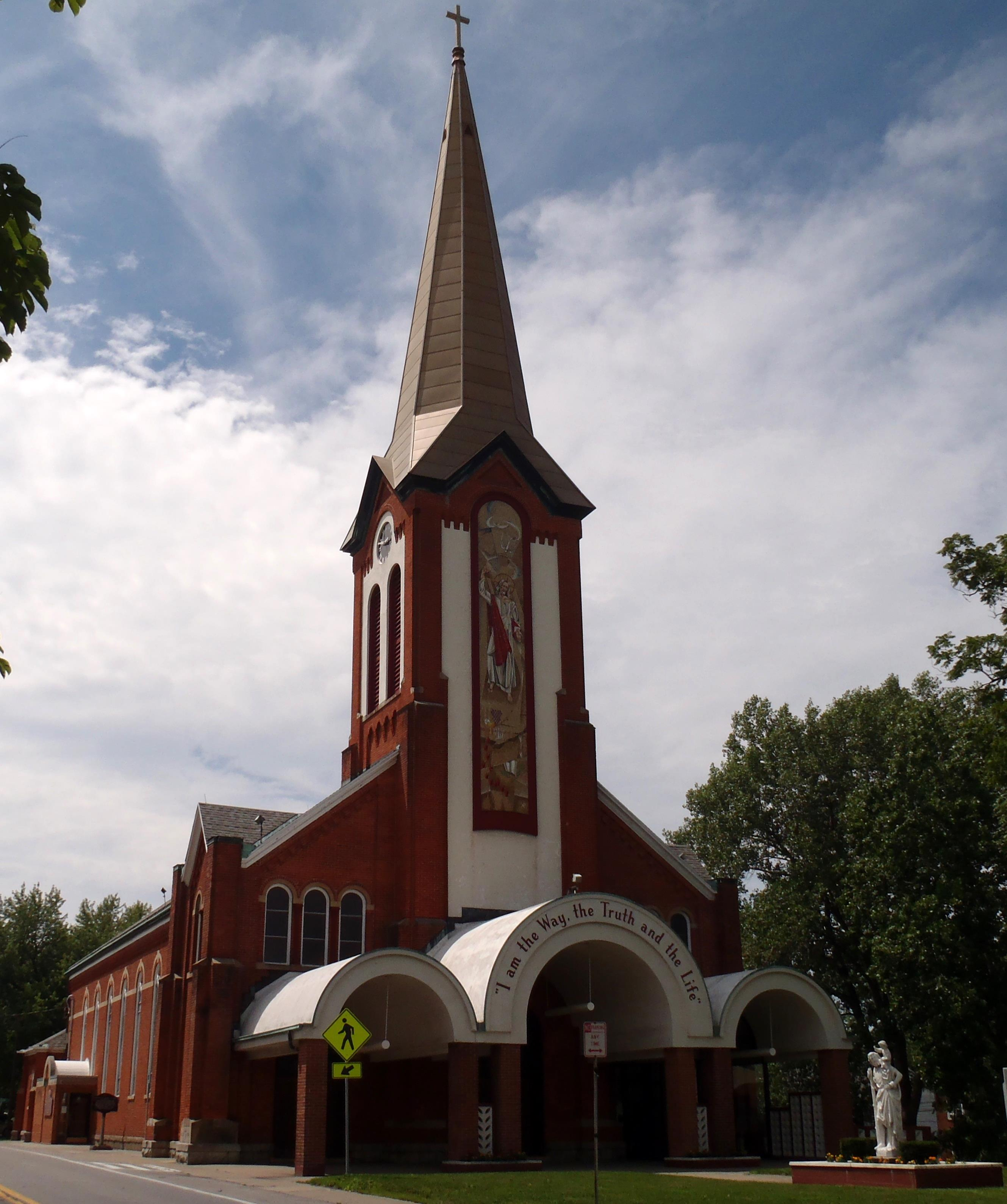
Fourteen Holy Helpers Church

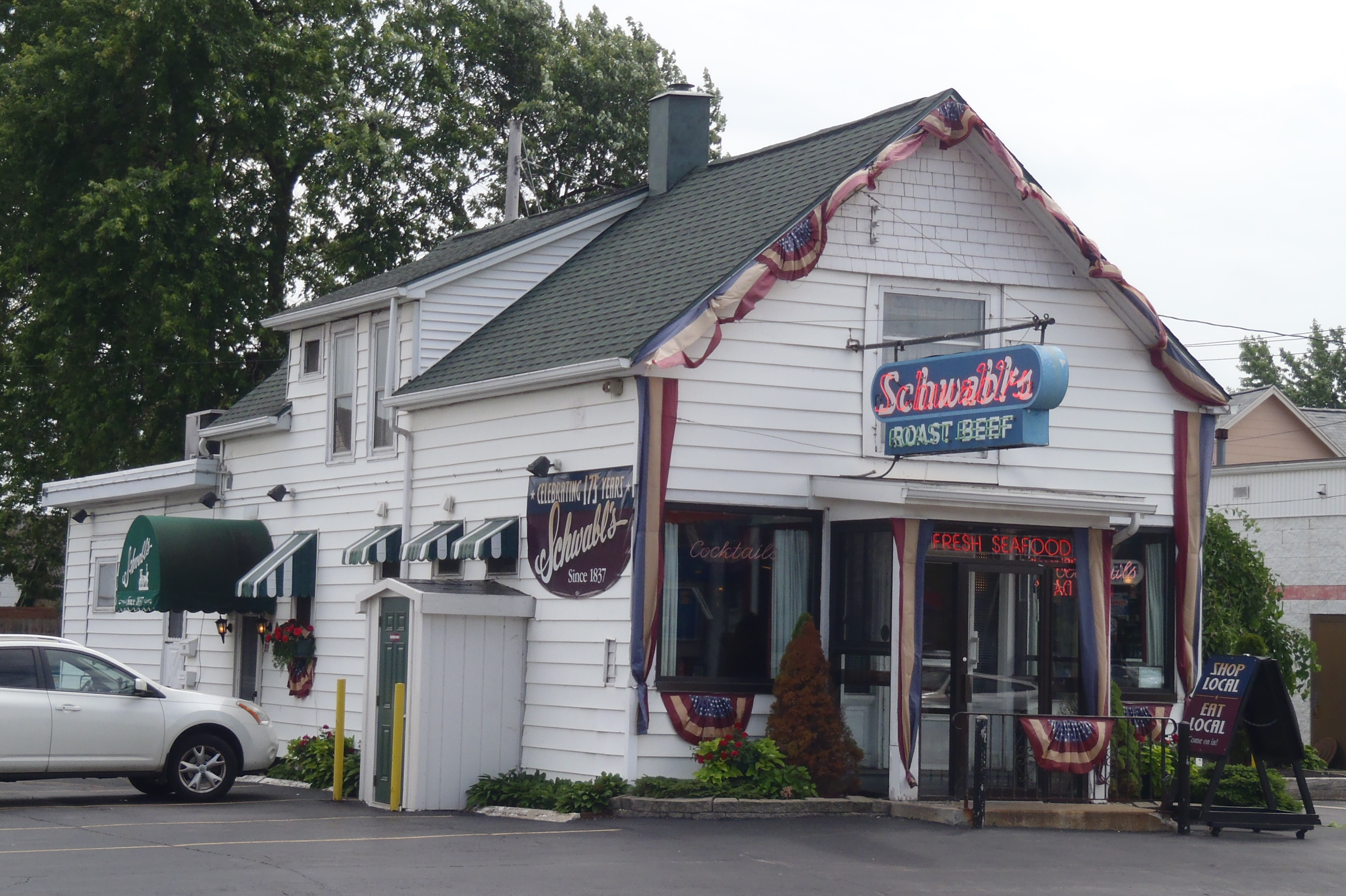
Schwabls Restaurant

== Related links ==
- West Seneca Central School District serves West Seneca and parts of Cheektowaga, Orchard Park and Hamburg.
