= National Register of Historic Places listings in Niagara County, New York =

Location of Niagara County in New York

This is a list of the National Register of Historic Places listings in Niagara County, New York.

This is intended to be a complete list of the properties and districts on the National Register of Historic Places in Niagara County, New York, United States. The locations of National Register properties and districts (at least for all showing latitude and longitude coordinates below) may be seen in a map by clicking on "Map of all coordinates".

There are 100 properties and districts listed on the National Register in the county. The city of Niagara Falls is the location of 38 of these properties and districts; they are listed separately, while 62 properties and districts outside Niagara Falls are listed here.

This National Park Service list is complete through NPS recent listings posted September 25, 2026.

Contents: Counties in New York
Albany (Albany) – Allegany – Bronx – Broome – Cattaraugus – Cayuga – Chautauqua – Chemung – Chenango – Clinton – Columbia – Cortland – Delaware – Dutchess (Poughkeepsie, Rhinebeck) – Erie (Buffalo) – Essex – Franklin – Fulton – Genesee – Greene – Hamilton – Herkimer – Jefferson – Kings – Lewis – Livingston – Madison – Monroe (Rochester) – Montgomery – Nassau – New York (Below 14th Street, 14th to 59th Streets, 59th to 110th Streets, Above 110th Street, Islands) – Niagara (Niagara Falls) – Oneida – Onondaga (Syracuse) – Ontario – Orange – Orleans – Oswego – Otsego – Putnam – Queens – Rensselaer – Richmond – Rockland – St. Lawrence – Saratoga – Schenectady – Schoharie – Schuyler – Seneca – Steuben – Suffolk – Sullivan – Tioga – Tompkins – Ulster – Warren – Washington – Wayne – Westchester (Northern, Southern, New Rochelle, Peekskill, Yonkers) – Wyoming – Yates

Legend: National Register of Historic Places listing National Historic Landmark Historic district National Historic Landmark District

== Current listings ==
=== Elsewhere ===
	Name on the Register	Image	Date listed	Location	City or town	Description
1	Ascension Roman Catholic Church Complex	Ascension Roman Catholic Church Complex	August 29, 2016 (#16000592)	168 and 172 Robinson St. and 61, 69, and 91 Keil St. 43°01′59″N 78°52′39″W	North Tonawanda	Complex built around 1894 church was social center of immigrant life in early 20th-century North Tonawanda
2	Bacon-Merchant-Moss House	Bacon-Merchant-Moss House	May 30, 2007 (#07000481)	32 Cottage St. 43°10′05″N 78°41′40″W	Lockport	Federal style stone dwelling built in 1832; part of the Multiple Property Submission for the Stone Buildings of Lockport, New York.
3	Bewley Building	Bewley Building	December 3, 2018 (#100003153)	4 Market Street; 43°10′15″N 78°41′25″W	Lockport	Irregularly shaped two-story brick Italian Renaissance Revival commercial block that has been a major part of city's downtown since 1928
4	Constant Riley W. Bixby House	Constant Riley W. Bixby House	November 15, 2002 (#02001333)	2888 Carmen Rd. 43°15′42″N 78°29′20″W	Hartland	Two-story cobblestone dwelling built in 1845; part of the Multiple Property Submission for the Cobblestone Architecture of New York State.
5	Col. William M. and Nancy Ralston Bond House	Col. William M. and Nancy Ralston Bond House	April 20, 1995 (#95000529)	143 Ontario St. 43°10′16″N 78°41′56″W	Lockport	Brick dwelling constructed in 1823 in the late Federal / early Greek Revival style.
6	Amzi Bradley Farmstead	Amzi Bradley Farmstead	November 15, 2002 (#02001332)	8915 Bradley Rd. 43°16′14″N 78°31′24″W	Hartland	Two-story cobblestone dwelling built in 1836; part of the Multiple Property Submission for the Cobblestone Architecture of New York State.
7	Carnegie Library	Carnegie Library	July 14, 1995 (#95000851)	249 Goundry St. 43°01′35″N 78°52′09″W	North Tonawanda	Philanthropist Andrew Carnegie funded library constructed in 1903; now local arts center.
8	John Carter Farmstead	John Carter Farmstead	May 30, 2007 (#07000490)	206 Lake Rd. 43°15′51″N 79°02′46″W	Youngstown	Italianate style brick dwelling and barn.
9	Chase-Crowley-Keep House	Chase-Crowley-Keep House	May 21, 2008 (#08000451)	305 High St. 43°09′52″N 78°41′08″W	Lockport	Stone dwelling built in 1856; part of the Multiple Property Submission for the Stone Buildings of Lockport, New York.
10	Chase-Hubbard-Williams House	Chase-Hubbard-Williams House	May 21, 2008 (#08000452)	327 High St. 43°09′50″N 78°41′06″W	Lockport	Stone dwelling built in 1870; part of the Multiple Property Submission for the Stone Buildings of Lockport, New York.
11	Cold Springs Cemetery	Cold Springs Cemetery	September 10, 2004 (#04000989)	4849 Cold Springs Rd. 43°10′59″N 78°39′25″W	Lockport	Cemetery founded in 1815; notable interments include Erie Canal proponent Jesse Hawley and Cuthbert W. Pound.
12	Nathan Comstock Jr. House	Nathan Comstock Jr. House	September 29, 2011 (#11000707)	299 Old Niagara Road; 43°11′14″N 78°40′47″W	Lockport	Stone Buildings of Lockport, New York MPS
13	Conkey House	Conkey House	May 30, 2003 (#03000479)	202 Akron St. 43°09′43″N 78°40′09″W	Lockport	Federal style stone dwelling built in 1842; part of the Multiple Property Submission for the Stone Buildings of Lockport, New York.
14	DAY PECKINPAUGH, (canal motorship)	DAY PECKINPAUGH, (canal motorship)	December 28, 2005 (#05001486)	NYS Barge Canal; 43°09′54″N 78°42′13″W	Lockport	Canal motorship built in 1921.
15	Dick Block	Dick Block	November 21, 2012 (#12000957)	62 Webster St; 43°01′25″N 78°52′41″W	North Tonawanda	
16	District #10 Schoolhouse	District #10 Schoolhouse	December 1, 2000 (#00001467)	9713 Seaman Rd. 43°16′53″N 78°29′20″W	Hartland	Cobblestone one-room school built in 1845; part of the Multiple Property Submission for the Cobblestone Architecture of New York State.
17	Dole House	Dole House	May 30, 2003 (#03000485)	74 Niagara St. 43°10′11″N 78°41′52″W	Lockport	Federal style stone dwelling built in 1840; part of the Multiple Property Submission for the Stone Buildings of Lockport, New York.
18	Farmers and Mechanics Savings Bank	Farmers and Mechanics Savings Bank	August 3, 2026 (#100013290)	116 Main Street; 43°10′13″N 78°41′24″W	Lockport	
19	First Baptist Church	First Baptist Church	September 15, 2004 (#04000987)	6073 East Ave. 43°17′11″N 78°42′29″W	Newfane	Cobblestone church built in 1843; part of the Multiple Property Submission for the Cobblestone Architecture of New York State.
20	Forsyth-Warren Farm	Forsyth-Warren Farm	January 24, 2020 (#100004910)	5182 Ridge Rd. 43°12′57″N 78°45′18″W	Cambria	
21	Fort Niagara Light	Fort Niagara Light	July 19, 1984 (#84002809)	Niagara River; 43°15′42″N 79°03′39″W	Youngstown	Lighthouse built in 1872; deactivated in 1993.
22	Frontier House	Frontier House	July 8, 1974 (#74001278)	460 Center St. 43°10′23″N 79°02′35″W	Lewiston	Stone former hotel structure built in 1824.
23	Gibbs House	Gibbs House	May 30, 2003 (#03000482)	98 N. Transit St. 43°10′17″N 78°41′54″W	Lockport	Two-story stone dwelling built in 1850; part of the Multiple Property Submission for the Stone Buildings of Lockport, New York.
24	Harrington Cobblestone Farmhouse and Barn Complex	Harrington Cobblestone Farmhouse and Barn Complex	December 7, 2005 (#05001396)	8993 Ridge Rd. 43°14′37″N 78°31′35″W	Hartland	Cobblestone house built in 1843; part of the Multiple Property Submission for the Cobblestone Architecture of New York State.
25	Harrison Radiator Corporation Factory		April 22, 2021 (#100006486)	190 Walnut St. and 160 Washburn St. 43°10′12″N 78°41′11″W	Lockport	
26	Allan Herschell Carousel Factory	Allan Herschell Carousel Factory	April 18, 1985 (#85000856)	180 Thompson St. 43°01′46″N 78°52′24″W	North Tonawanda	Carousel factory built 1910-1915; now museum.
27	The Herschell–Spillman Motor Company Complex	The Herschell–Spillman Motor Company Complex	June 5, 2013 (#13000358)	184 Sweeney St. 43°01′24″N 78°52′26″W	North Tonawanda	
28	High and Locust Streets Historic District	High and Locust Streets Historic District	November 19, 2014 (#14000937)	23-54 Park Pl., 143-399 High, 119-224 Locust & 23-43 Spalding Sts. 43°09′51″N 78°41′16″W	Lockport	Well-preserved neighborhood of homes built by affluent residents in late 19th century
29	Hopkins House	Hopkins House	May 30, 2003 (#03000480)	83 Monroe St. 43°10′39″N 78°41′39″W	Lockport	Stone dwelling built in 1833; part of the Multiple Property Submission for the Stone Buildings of Lockport, New York.
30	House at 8 Berkley Drive	House at 8 Berkley Drive	May 4, 2009 (#09000287)	8 Berkley Drive; 43°09′19″N 78°41′17″W	Lockport	Prairie style home constructed in 1957.
31	Lewiston Mound	Lewiston Mound	January 21, 1974 (#74001279)	Earl W. Brydges Artpark State Park; 43°10′00″N 79°02′40″W	Lewiston	Indian burial mound.
32	Lockport Industrial District	Lockport Industrial District	November 11, 1975 (#75001211)	Bounded roughly by Erie Canal, Gooding, Clinton, and Water Sts. 43°10′24″N 78°41′31″W	Lockport	Includes two sets of Erie Canal locks constructed in 1859 and in 1909-1918 and related industrial structures or remains.
33	Lower Landing Archeological District	Lower Landing Archeological District	July 18, 1974 (#74001280)	Address Restricted	Lewiston	Western end of portage around Niagara Falls.
34	Lower Niagara River Spear Fishing Docks Historic District		August 29, 2012 (#12000578)	Address Restricted	Lewiston	
35	Lowertown Historic District	Lowertown Historic District	June 4, 1973 (#73001225)	Roughly bounded by Erie Canal and New York Central RR; 43°10′47″N 78°40′42″W	Lockport	Residential district with structures constructed 1820s to 1860s.
36	Maloney House	Maloney House	May 30, 2003 (#03000481)	279 Caledonia St. 43°10′21″N 78°42′14″W	Lockport	Stone dwelling built about 1860; part of the Multiple Property Submission for the Stone Buildings of Lockport, New York.
37	Benjamin C. Moore Mill	Benjamin C. Moore Mill	June 19, 1973 (#73001226)	Pine St. on the Erie Canal; 43°10′14″N 78°41′34″W	Lockport	Stone former grist mill built in 1864; served as city hall and now welcome center.
38	Morse Cobblestone Farmhouse	Morse Cobblestone Farmhouse	August 30, 2010 (#10000591)	2773 Maple Road; 43°16′51″N 78°48′00″W	Wilson	part of the Cobblestone Architecture of New York State MPS
39	Philo Newton Cobblestone House	Philo Newton Cobblestone House	November 15, 2002 (#02001334)	3573 Wruck Rd. 43°14′07″N 78°32′04″W	Hartland	Cobblestone house built in 1830; part of the Multiple Property Submission for the Cobblestone Architecture of New York State.
40	New York State Barge Canal	New York State Barge Canal	October 15, 2014 (#14000860)	Linear across county 43°10′14″N 78°41′36″W	Lockport, Middleport, North Tonawanda, Pendleton, Royalton, Wheatfield	Successor to Erie Canal approved by state voters in early 20th century to compete with railroads.
41	Niagara County Courthouse and County Clerk's Office	Niagara County Courthouse and County Clerk's Office	May 9, 1997 (#97000417)	175 Hawley St. and 139 Niagara St. 43°10′10″N 78°42′03″W	Lockport	Former County Clerk's Office constructed 1856; courthouse built 1886 with later additions.
42	Niagara Power Project Historic District	Niagara Power Project Historic District	July 3, 2017 (#100001265)	5777 Lewiston Rd. 43°08′26″N 79°02′20″W	Lewiston	U.S. half of massive mid-20th century international hydroelectric project tapping the Niagara River
43	North Ridge United Methodist Church	North Ridge United Methodist Church	December 31, 2002 (#02001649)	3930 North Ridge Rd. 43°12′44″N 78°49′40″W	North Ridge	Cobblestone church built in 1848; part of the Multiple Property Submission for the Cobblestone Architecture of New York State.
44	Old Fort Niagara-Colonial Niagara Historic District	Old Fort Niagara-Colonial Niagara Historic District	October 15, 1966 (#66000556)	N of Youngstown on NY 18; 43°15′48″N 79°03′48″W	Youngstown	Fort located at Niagara River and Lake Ontario dating to 1678.
45	Thomas Oliver House	Thomas Oliver House	November 19, 1998 (#98001390)	175 Locust St. 43°09′56″N 78°40′32″W	Lockport	Queen Anne style brick house constructed in 1891.
46	Payne Avenue High School	Payne Avenue High School	March 7, 2019 (#100003431)	621 Payne Ave. 43°02′24″N 78°52′25″W	North Tonawanda	
47	Pound–Hitchins House	Pound–Hitchins House	January 27, 2015 (#14001215)	325 Summit St. 43°09′11″N 78°42′25″W	Lockport	1833 Greek Revival stone house built by early settler of Lockport
48	Riviera Theatre	Riviera Theatre	March 20, 1980 (#80002731)	67 Webster St. 43°01′26″N 78°52′38″W	North Tonawanda	Theater constructed in 1926; features Mighty Wurlitzer
49	St. John's Episcopal Church	St. John's Episcopal Church	May 10, 1990 (#90000687)	117 Main St. 43°15′13″N 79°03′01″W	Youngstown	Gothic Revival style church constructed in 1878
50	Stickney House	Stickney House	May 30, 2003 (#03000483)	133 Lock St. 43°10′20″N 78°41′33″W	Lockport	Stone dwelling built in 1854; part of the Multiple Property Submission for the Stone Buildings of Lockport, New York.
51	Sweeney Estate Historic District	Sweeney Estate Historic District	August 27, 2020 (#100005471)	Portions of Bryant, Christina, Falconer, Goundry, Grant, Niagara, Oliver, Tremont, and Vandervoot Sts., Lincoln, Payne, Thompson and Whiting Aves., Louisa Pkwy., and Pine Woods Dr. 43°01′55″N 78°52′08″W	North Tonawanda	
52	William Taylor House	William Taylor House	December 4, 2012 (#12000998)	97 S. Main St. 43°12′22″N 78°28′36″W	Middleport	
53	Thirty Mile Point Light	Thirty Mile Point Light	July 19, 1984 (#84003922)	Lake Ontario 30 miles (48 km) east of Niagara River; 43°22′29″N 78°29′11″W	Somerset	Lighthouse constructed in 1875.
54	Town of Niagara District School No. 2	Town of Niagara District School No. 2	February 9, 2005 (#05000021)	9670 Lockport Rd. 43°07′18″N 78°57′03″W	Town of Niagara	One-room school built in 1878.
55	Union Station	Union Station	December 2, 1977 (#77000966)	95 Union Ave. 43°10′26″N 78°41′08″W	Lockport	Romanesque style train station constructed in 1889; destroyed by fire and shell remains.
56	US Post Office-Lockport	US Post Office-Lockport	May 11, 1989 (#88002345)	1 East Ave. 43°10′16″N 78°41′18″W	Lockport	Post office built in 1902-1904; part of the Multiple Property Submission for the US Post Offices in New York State, 1858-1943.
57	US Post Office-Middleport	US Post Office-Middleport	May 11, 1989 (#88002353)	42 Main St. 43°12′40″N 78°28′37″W	Middleport	One of three post offices in state (along with Frankfort and Lake George) to use the same modernist-Colonial Revival design.
58	US Post Office-North Tonawanda	US Post Office-North Tonawanda	May 11, 1989 (#88002357)	141 Goundry St. 43°01′29″N 78°52′23″W	North Tonawanda	Post office built in 1912-1914; part of the Multiple Property Submission for the US Post Offices in New York State, 1858-1943.
59	Van Horn Mansion	Van Horn Mansion	September 9, 1991 (#91001149)	2165 Lockport-Olcott Rd. 43°18′49″N 78°42′51″W	Newfane	Two-story brick mansion built in 1823.
60	Peter D. Walter House	Peter D. Walter House	May 30, 2007 (#07000489)	127 Ontario St. 43°10′16″N 78°41′54″W	Lockport	Two-story stone dwelling built in 1858; part of the Multiple Property Submission for the Stone Buildings of Lockport, New York.
61	Watson House	Watson House	May 30, 2003 (#03000486)	129 Outwater Dr. 43°10′48″N 78°42′08″W	Lockport	Two-story stone dwelling built in 1854; part of the Multiple Property Submission for the Stone Buildings of Lockport, New York.
62	White-Pound House	White-Pound House	May 30, 2003 (#03000484)	140 Pine St. 43°09′58″N 78°41′31″W	Lockport	Two-story stone dwelling built in 1835; part of the Multiple Property Submission for the Stone Buildings of Lockport, New York.

== See also ==
- National Register of Historic Places listings in New York
