= Dole House =

Dole House may refer to:

- James D. Dole Homestead, Waipahu, Hawaii, NRHP-listed
- Dole-Little House, Newbury, Massachusetts, a house museum
- Dole House (Lockport, New York), NRHP-listed
- Dole-Darrell House, Portsmouth, Ohio, NRHP-listed in Scioto County
