= Lockport Cave =

Caverns in New York, United States

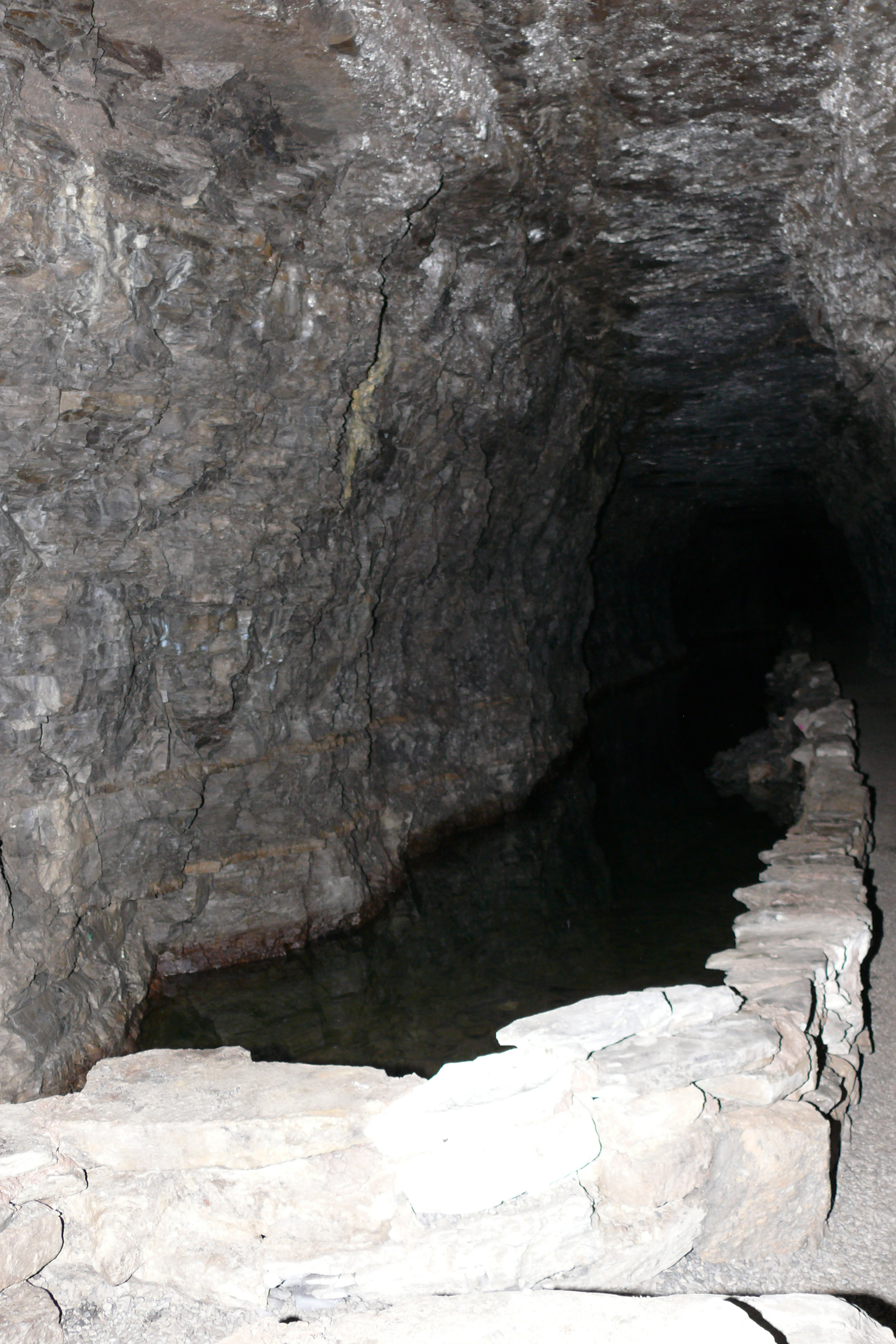
- Interactive map of Lockport Cave
- Location: Lockport, NY
- Coordinates: 43°10′19″N 78°41′33″W
- Discovery: 19th century
- Geology: Lockport Dolomite
- Entrances: 1 (confirmed)
- Entrances list: Culvert entrance, Ravine entrance, Waterfall entrance
- Hazards: sewer may merge with cave

The Lockport Cave can refer to one of two caverns beneath the city of Lockport, New York. One of the caves formed naturally in the underlying dolomite and limestone bedrocks, whereas the other is a hydraulic raceway (water tunnel) constructed in the nineteenth century.

Historical and recent accounts of attempted exploration of the natural cave system exist, although the cave has been sealed since 1886. The true size of the cave remains a mystery, although it is speculated to have an area of several square miles. The Lockport Cave Company was formed in 1883 to explore and remove mud from the cave, however little progress was made because of inadequate funding and frequent flooding.

The man-made hydraulic raceway, often called "The Lockport Caves" by locals, was constructed between 1858 and 1900. The raceway supplied water to local industries for decades, and now contains a tourist attraction, the Lockport Cave and Underground Boat Ride.

The canal received national attention in 2023 when a tour boat capsized, killing one person and injuring several; this incident has led officials to explore regulation of this kind of attraction.
