= Lockport, New York =

City in New York, United States

Lockport, New York Seneca: Jodö:sho:t
- City
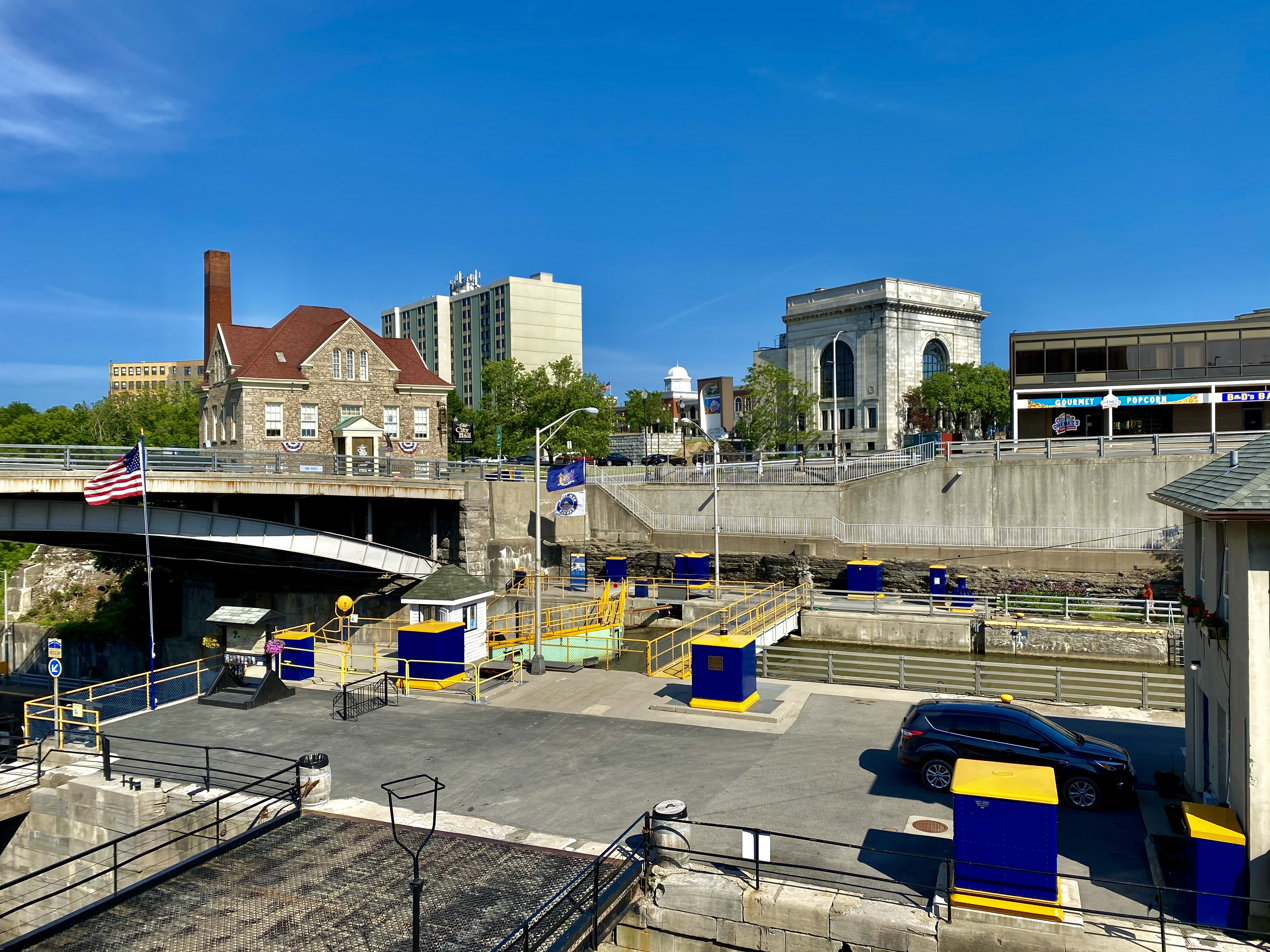
- Downtown Lockport with Locks 34 and 35 Below

- Flag Seal
- Nickname: The Lock City
- Location in Niagara County and the state of New York
- Coordinates: 43°10′11″N 78°41′28″W
- Country: United States
- State: New York
- County: Niagara

Government
  - Type: Mayor-council
  - Mayor: John Lombardi III (R)
  - Common Council: Members' List: At-Large Member: • Kevin M. Kirchberger (R); • W1: John D. Craig (R); • W2: Anita Mullane (D); • W3: Mark S. Devine (R); • W4: Kathryn Fogle (R); • W5: Margaret Lupo (R)

Area
  - Total: 8.44 sq mi (21.87 km^{2})
  - Land: 8.40 sq mi (21.76 km^{2})
  - Water: 0.046 sq mi (0.12 km^{2})
- Elevation: 614 ft (187 m)

Population (2020)
  - Total: 20,876
  - Density: 2,485.3/sq mi (959.58/km^{2})
- Time zone: UTC-5 (Eastern (EST))
  - Summer (DST): UTC-4 (EDT)
- ZIP Codes: 14094-14095
- Area code: 716
- FIPS code: 36-43082
- GNIS feature ID: 0955783
- Website: lockportny.gov

Lockport (Seneca: Jodö:sho:t) is both a city and the town that surrounds it in Niagara County, New York, United States. Lockport is a northern suburb of Buffalo. The city is the Niagara county seat; as of the 2020 census, Lockport had a population of 20,876.

Its name derives from a set of locks (Lock Numbers 34 and 35) in the Erie Canal within the city that were built to allow canal barges to traverse the sixty-foot (18 m) natural drop of the Niagara Escarpment. It is part of the Buffalo–Niagara Falls metropolitan area.

== History ==
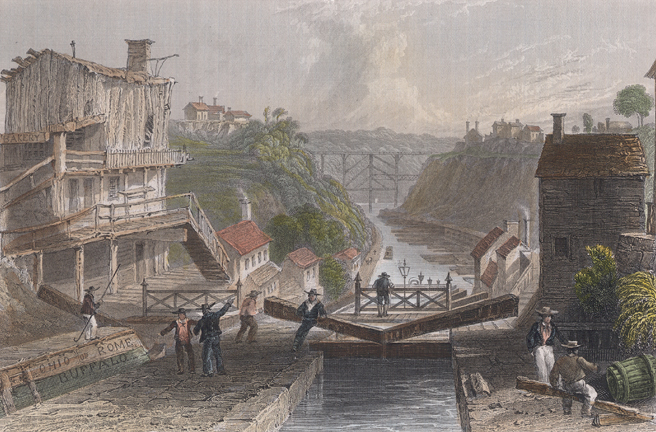
Lockport 1839 by William Henry Bartlett

The indigenous Seneca people know the site of Lockport as Jodö:sho:t, literally 'springs there'.

The New York State Legislature authorized the Erie Canal's construction in April 1816. The route proposed by surveyors was to traverse an area in central Niagara County, New York, which was then free of European settlers. At the time, the nearest settlers were in nearby Cold Springs, New York. Following the announcement, land speculators began to buy large plots along and near the proposed route of the canal. By December 1820, when the exact location of the step locks had been determined, the area that would become Lockport was owned by only fifteen men, many of whom were Quakers.

The city of Lockport was incorporated in 1865. The Erie Canal was supplanted by the larger New York State Barge Canal in 1918, and the famous south "Flight of Five" locks was replaced by two much larger locks E34 and E35. The north "Flight of Five" lock chambers still remain as a spillway.

In recent years, public officials and private businesses have made an effort to promote Lockport history as a regional or national tourist attraction. This includes the completion of the Canal Discovery Center, the Lockport Cave and Underground Boat Ride tour, and the Lockport Locks and Erie Canal Cruises. Local officials are seeking state grants to reconstruct the historic "Flight of Five" and make it a living history site complete with boat rides and reenactors. Published reports state that such a living history site in Lockport, marketed as a day trip from Niagara Falls, could draw thousands of tourists to Lockport each year.

The city has a number of properties on the National Register of Historic Places. They include the Bacon-Merchant-Moss House, Col. William M. and Nancy Ralston Bond House, Chase-Crowley-Keep House, Chase-Hubbard-Williams House, Nathan Comstock Jr. House, Conkey House, Day Peckinpaugh, Dole House, Gibbs House, High and Locust Streets Historic District, Hopkins House, House at 8 Berkley Drive, Lockport Industrial District, Lowertown Historic District, Maloney House, Benjamin C. Moore Mill, Niagara County Courthouse and County Clerk's Office, Thomas Oliver House, Pound–Hitchins House, Stickney House, Union Station, United States Post Office, Peter D. Walter House, Watson House, and White-Pound House.

Lockport's largest employer is General Motors Components, the former Harrison Radiator Corporation, which was founded locally in 1912 and which became a division of General Motors Corporation in 1918. After 10 years of ownership by Delphi Corporation as Delphi Thermal Systems, it returned to General Motors in October 2009.

In 1948, the Lockport Chief of Police denied a permit for a Jehovah's Witnesses minister to preach in a public park using a sound truck. In Saia v. New York, the U.S. Supreme Court struck down the city ordinance as a violation of the First Amendment.

== Geography ==
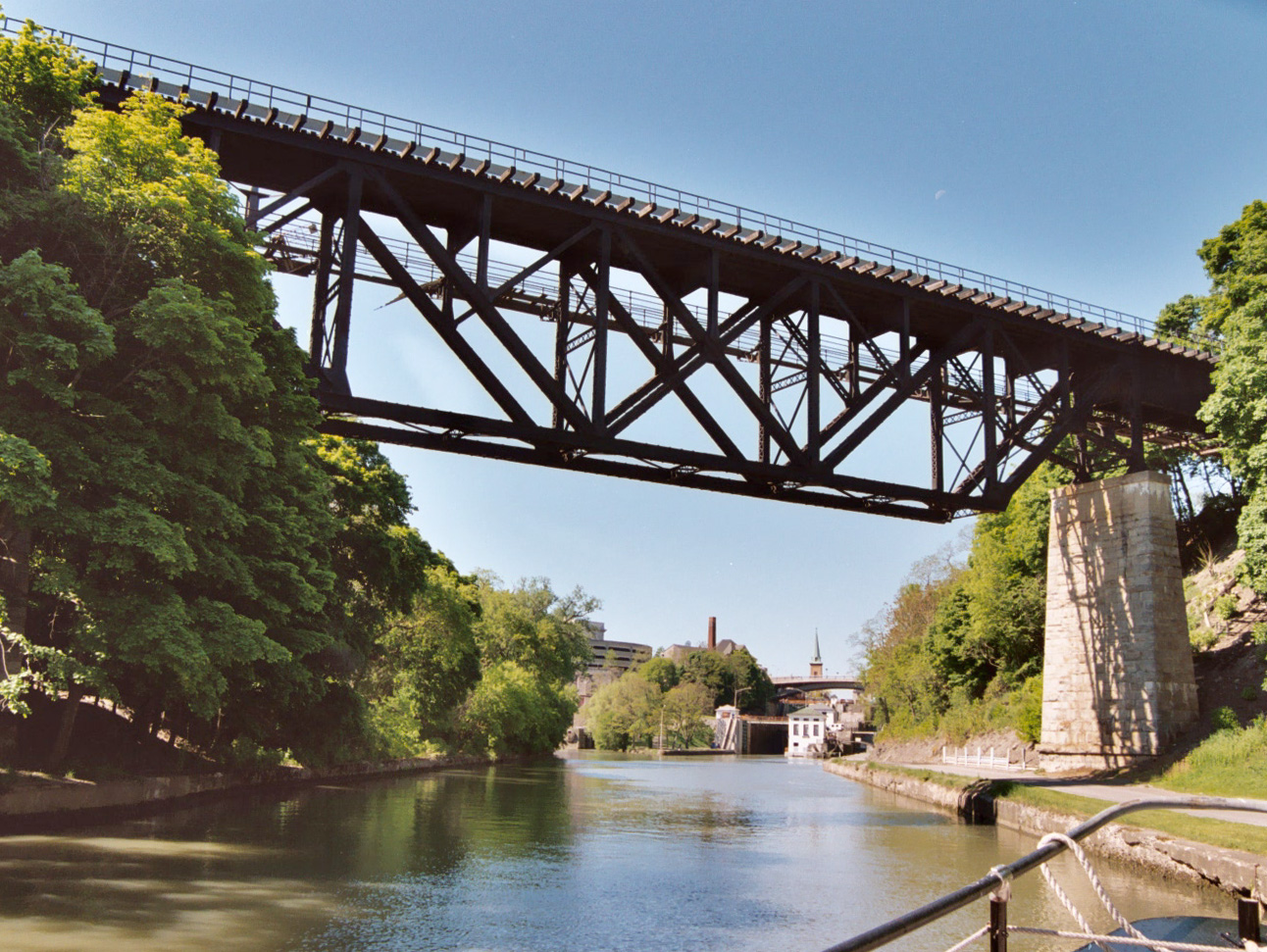
The current double lift Lockport Lock is left in the distance with the northern Flight of Five to its right. St. Mary's Roman Catholic Church is in the background. The Falls Road Railroad runs above.

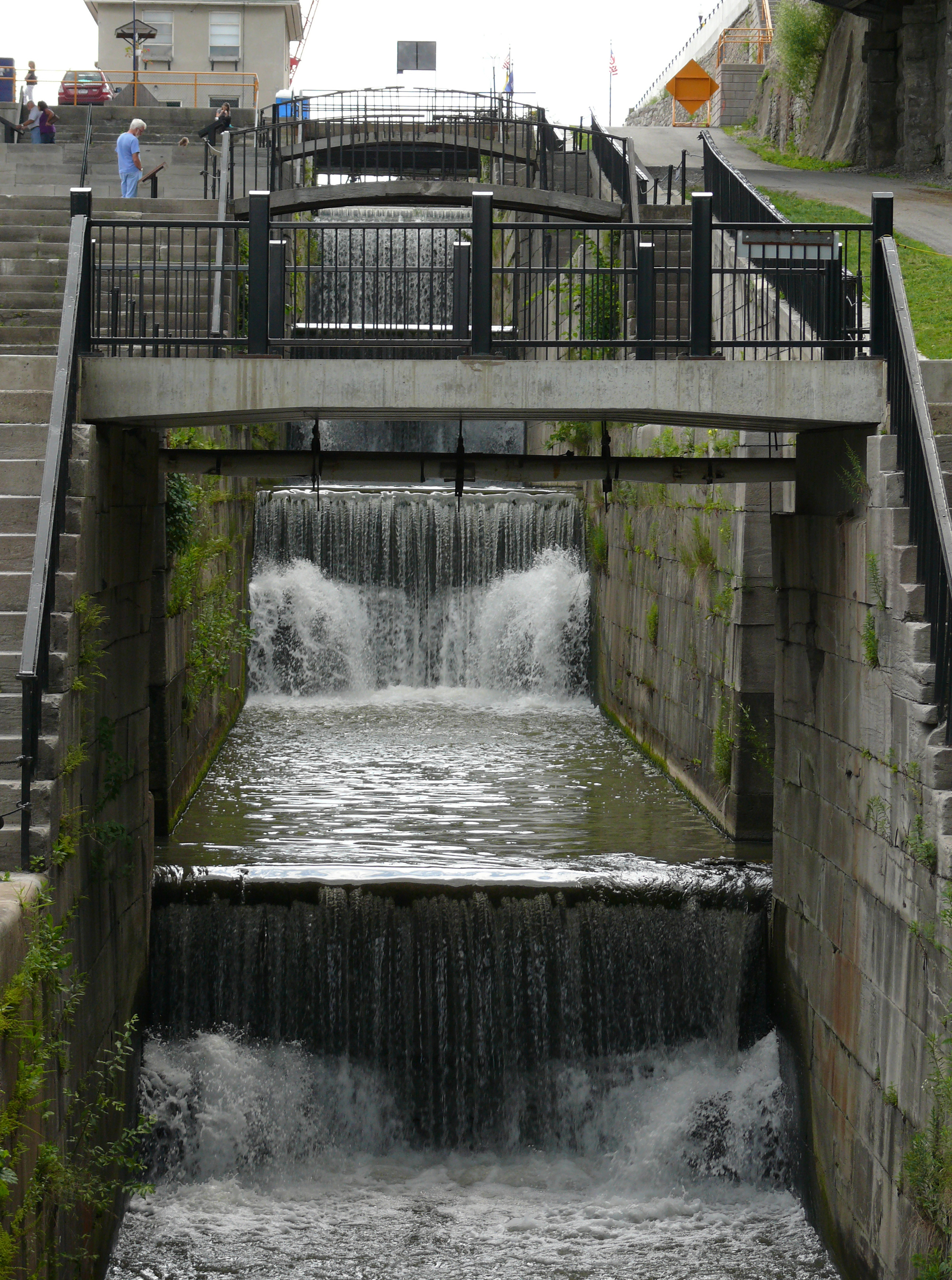
Original northern five step lock structure crossing the Niagara Escarpment at Lockport now without gates and used as a cascade for excess water. Double 24 1/2-foot-high (7.5 m), 40-foot-wide (12 m) modern locks are to the left which replaced the original southern Flight of Five lock structure.

According to the U.S. Census Bureau, the city has a total area of 8.6 square miles (22.4 km^{2}), of which 8.5 square miles (22.1 km^{2}) is land and 0.1 square miles (0.3 km^{2}) (1.39%) is water. The Erie Canal passes through the center of the city, turning south toward Tonawanda Creek. It climbs the Niagara Escarpment through a series of two modern locks. Originally, a double set of five smaller combined locks were used.

Lockport is at the junction of several major truck routes, including NY Route 78 (Transit Road), NY Route 31, NY Route 77 and NY Route 93. It is 17 miles north of Interstate 90 via NY Route 78. The highest point is the bell tower at 452 High Street, with the street itself being the highest street as measured by frontage above the 650 feet elevation.

Lockport lies in area code 716.

=== Climate ===
Climate data for Lockport, New York (1991-2020 normals)
Month	Jan	Feb	Mar	Apr	May	Jun	Jul	Aug	Sep	Oct	Nov	Dec	Year
Mean daily maximum °C (°F)	32.7 (0.4)	35.0 (1.7)	44.2 (6.8)	55.9 (13.3)	69.4 (20.8)	78.1 (25.6)	82.3 (27.9)	80.0 (26.7)	73.8 (23.2)	60.9 (16.1)	48.8 (9.3)	38.3 (3.5)	58.3 (14.6)
Daily mean °C (°F)	25.4 (−3.7)	27.1 (−2.7)	34.9 (1.6)	45.8 (7.7)	58.5 (14.7)	67.7 (19.8)	71.8 (22.1)	70.4 (21.3)	63.8 (17.7)	51.7 (10.9)	41.2 (5.1)	31.1 (−0.5)	49.1 (9.5)
Mean daily minimum °C (°F)	18.1 (−7.7)	19.2 (−7.1)	25.5 (−3.6)	35.7 (2.1)	47.6 (8.7)	57.2 (14.0)	61.3 (16.3)	60.8 (16.0)	53.7 (12.1)	42.6 (5.9)	33.7 (0.9)	23.8 (−4.6)	39.9 (4.4)
Average rainfall mm (inches)	2.94 (75)	2.25 (57)	2.65 (67)	3.36 (85)	3.05 (77)	3.43 (87)	3.76 (96)	3.21 (82)	3.54 (90)	3.70 (94)	3.05 (77)	2.92 (74)	37.86 (962)

== Tourist attractions ==
- The Lockport Locks and Erie Canal Cruises boat rides are offered on the Erie Canal, with one proceeding upward through the modern locks for a short cruise, and returning to pass downstream under two lift bridges and then returning to the docks.
- The Lockport Erie Canal Museum is in an old lock control structure between the modern Locks 34 & 35 and the remaining original "Flight of Five" Locks spillway, and contains historic photographs, maps, engineering drawings and antique machinery.
- The Canal Discovery Center is housed in an old church about 100 yards to the west of the locks.
- Lockport has the widest bridge (399' wide x 129' long) in North America, which spans the canal to the southwest of the locks.
- The Lockport Cave and Underground Boat Ride tour can be taken near the locks.
- The Niagara County Historical Society, at 215 Niagara Street, is a complex of buildings that documents the history of Niagara County.
- 100 American Craftsmen is an annual show of arts and crafts held at the Kenan Arena. The arena is on the historic Kenan Center campus.
- Ida Fritz Park plays host to the Taste of Lockport every August and to a cruise night every Monday during the summer.
- Lockport has an ice rink for the Clarence Mustangs and Lockport Express (now defunct team in the North American 3 Hockey League) called Cornerstone Arena.

== Demographics ==
Historical population
Census	Pop.	Note	%±
1860	10,871		—
1870	12,426		14.3%
1880	13,522		8.8%
1890	16,038		18.6%
1900	16,581		3.4%
1910	17,970		8.4%
1920	21,308		18.6%
1930	23,160		8.7%
1940	24,379		5.3%
1950	25,133		3.1%
1960	26,443		5.2%
1970	25,399		−3.9%
1980	24,844		−2.2%
1990	24,426		−1.7%
2000	22,279		−8.8%
2010	21,165		−5.0%
2020	20,876		−1.4%
U.S. Decennial Census

=== 2020 census ===
As of the 2020 census, Lockport had a population of 20,876. The median age was 39.2 years. 21.6% of residents were under the age of 18 and 16.8% of residents were 65 years of age or older. For every 100 females there were 95.2 males, and for every 100 females age 18 and over there were 93.2 males age 18 and over.

99.3% of residents lived in urban areas, while 0.7% lived in rural areas.

There were 9,293 households in Lockport, of which 26.0% had children under the age of 18 living in them. Of all households, 32.9% were married-couple households, 24.4% were households with a male householder and no spouse or partner present, and 32.4% were households with a female householder and no spouse or partner present. About 37.8% of all households were made up of individuals and 13.7% had someone living alone who was 65 years of age or older.

There were 10,178 housing units, of which 8.7% were vacant. The homeowner vacancy rate was 1.5% and the rental vacancy rate was 6.7%.

Racial composition as of the 2020 census
Race	Number	Percent
White	16,881	80.9%
Black or African American	1,690	8.1%
American Indian and Alaska Native	93	0.4%
Asian	128	0.6%
Native Hawaiian and Other Pacific Islander	12	0.1%
Some other race	372	1.8%
Two or more races	1,700	8.1%
Hispanic or Latino (of any race)	1,140	5.5%

=== 2010 census ===
At the 2010 census, there were 21,165 people, 9,153 households and 5,172 families residing in the city. There were 10,092 housing units. The racial makeup of the city was 87.5% White, 7.2% Black or African American, 0.5% Native American, 0.5% Asian, 0.02% Pacific Islander, 0.8% from other races, and 3.5% from two or more races. Hispanic or Latino people of any race were 3.2% of the population.

=== 2000 census ===
At the 2000 census, there were 9,459 households; 30.5% of households included children under the age of 18, 41.4% were married couples living together, 13.5% had a female householder with no husband present, and 40.7% were non-families. 34.7% of all households were made up of individuals, and 13.3% had someone living alone who was 65 years of age or older. The average household size was 2.33 and the average family size was 3.03.

25.8% of the population were under the age of 18, 8.4% from 18 to 24, 30.6% from 25 to 44, 20.9% from 45 to 64, and 14.3% who were 65 years of age or older. The median age was 36 years. For every 100 females, there were 91.7 males. For every 100 females age 18 and over, there were 87.4 males.

The median household income was $35,228, and the median family income was $44,614. Males had a median income of $35,197 and females $23,944. The per capita income was $19,620. About 11.7% of families and 13.3% of the population were below the poverty line, including 18.9% of those under age 18 and 7.4% of those age 65 or over.

== Local politics ==
The city is governed by a mayor and a city council. The mayor is elected to a four-year term, the aldermen to two-year terms. There are five wards in the city, resulting in five aldermen plus one alderman-at-large, who is elected by the entire city. In 2003, Michael W. Tucker was elected mayor of the city of Lockport; he was reelected in 2007 and 2011. However, he resigned in 2014 during an investigation into his scandal. Nothing became of the scandal after multiple council members reached out to the governor to launch the investigation. instead of serving his third four-year term. City of Lockport Common Council President and 2nd Ward Alderwoman Anne McCaffrey replaced Tucker as interim mayor and was sworn in on February 24, 2014. She was later elected to a full four-year term that began in January 2016. She resigned and accepted the position as president and CEO of Eastern Niagara Hospital.

== Education ==
Lockport City School District oversees all local public schools. The district includes all of Lockport city and most of Lockport town.

- Anna Merritt Elementary School
- Charles Upson Elementary School
- George M. Southard Elementary School
- Roy B. Kelley Elementary School
- Emmet Belknap Intermediate School
- Aaron Mossell Junior High School
- Lockport High School
- Lockport High School West
- DeSales Catholic School

DeSales Catholic School is a local private elementary school within the regional Roman Catholic Diocese of Buffalo. The school was named after St. Francis de Sales. Previously a high school, it now teaches classes from pre-school through eighth grade.

== Notable people ==
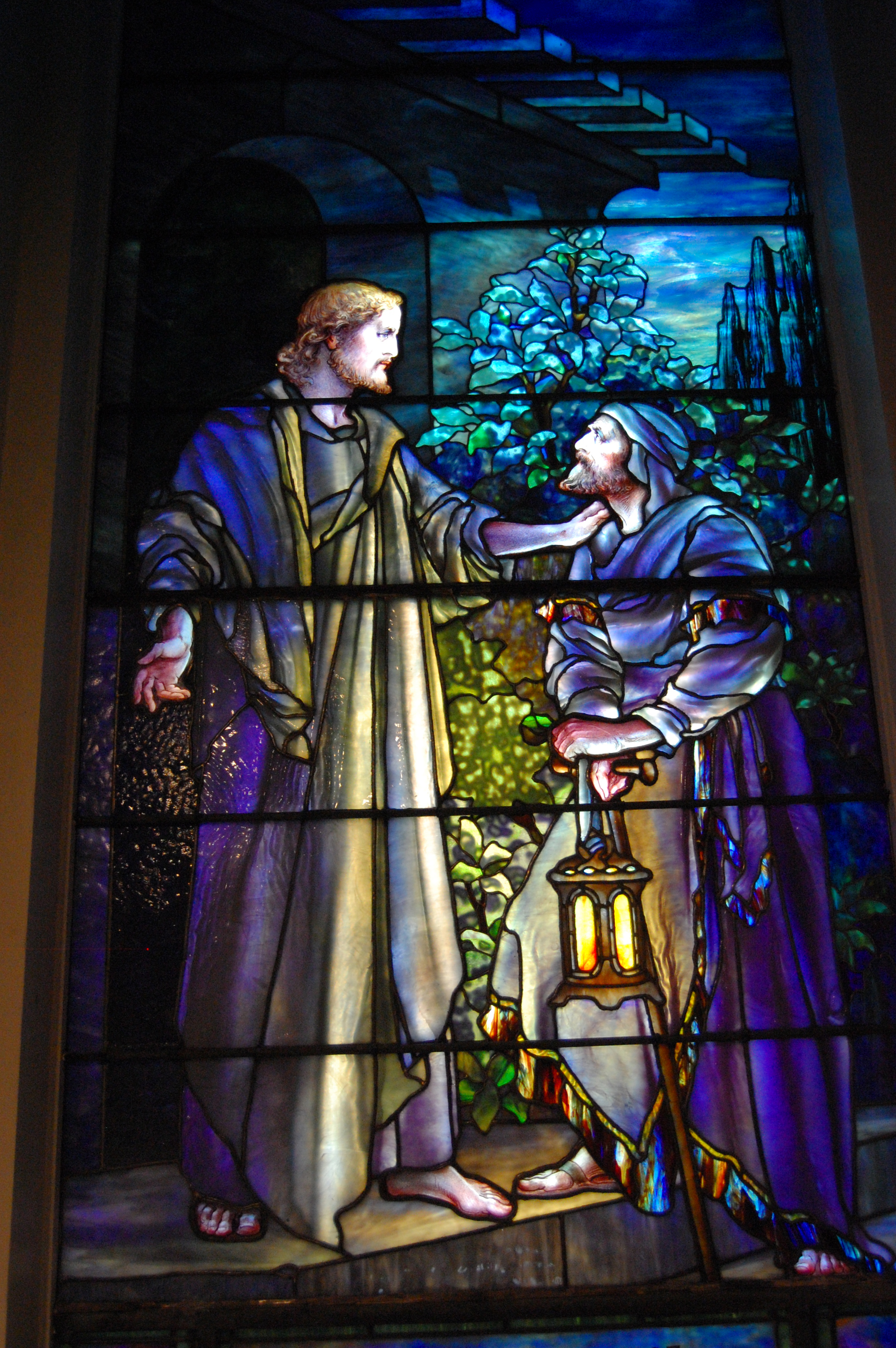
Louis Tiffany stained glass window at the First Presbyterian Church

Some people of note who were born in Lockport are:

- Kim Alexis, supermodel
- Walter Ransom Gail Baker, former vice president of General Electric, director of engineering for the Radio Manufacturers Association, founder of NTSC
- Philip Baruth, writer and politician
- George W. Batten, former New York State Treasurer
- Anna Smeed Benjamin (1834–1924), social reformer
- Holly Broadbent Sr., orthodontist
- Lillian Bronson, film/TV character actress
- Ellen Burrell, professor of mathematics at Wellesley College
- Bernard Buzyniski, retired American Football League player
- Helen Stuart Campbell, social reformer and home economist
- Jerry Cook, race car driver
- Francis R. Delano, banker and lawyer
- Geoffrey Deuel, actor
- Lyman Draper, secretary for the Wisconsin Historical Society, Superintendent of Public Instruction of Wisconsin
- M. A. B. Evans, poet
- David Fluellen, pro football player
- Ferrin Fraser, radio script writer for Little Orphan Annie and Frank Buck
- Harold Huston George, general officer in the United States Army Air Forces during World War II
- Lt Col William G. Gregory, astronaut (ret.) in the NASA Space Shuttle program
- Katherine Hannigan, writer
- Tommy Hicks, boxer
- Alice Tisdale Hobart, novelist
- William Leonard Hunt (1838–1929), also known by the stage name the Great Farini, tightrope performances at Niagara Falls, inventor of the "human cannonball"
- James Jackson, Jr., former US congressman, Mayor of Lockport
- Sean Kugler, head coach for the UTEP Miners football team
- William F. Leonard, Medal of Honor recipient
- Duane Lyman, architect
- Jane Rignel, Recipient of the Silver Star
- Othniel Charles Marsh, 19th-century paleontologist, discovered and named many fossils found in the American West
- Timothy McVeigh, convicted terrorist responsible for Oklahoma City bombing
- Stephanie Miller, nationally syndicated radio talk show host and daughter of William E. Miller
- William E. Miller, 1964 vice presidential running mate of Barry Goldwater
- William G. Morgan, inventor of volleyball
- John Murphy, Buffalo Bills radio announcer
- Edwin Griswold Nourse, economist
- Joyce Carol Oates, author and professor
- Frank C. Penfold, artist, teacher
- Cuthbert W. Pound, former Chief Judge of the New York Court of Appeals
- John J. Raskob, DuPont and General Motors executive
- John B. Raymond, delegate from Dakota Territory to the United States House of Representatives
- Chris Sacca, tech start-up venture capitalist, former Head of Special Initiatives at Google
- John Shulock, retired MLB umpire
- Clip Smith, talk radio host
- Mark Snell, retired professional soccer player, former coach
- Brandon Stickney, journalist, author, and documentarian
- Daren Stone, professional football player
- Robert Thurston, science fiction writer
- Jack White, race car driver
- Charley Wood, amusement park developer
- Brock Yates, automotive writer and author, senior editor of Car and Driver magazine, wrote story and scripts for movies The Cannonball Run and Smokey & the Bandit 2

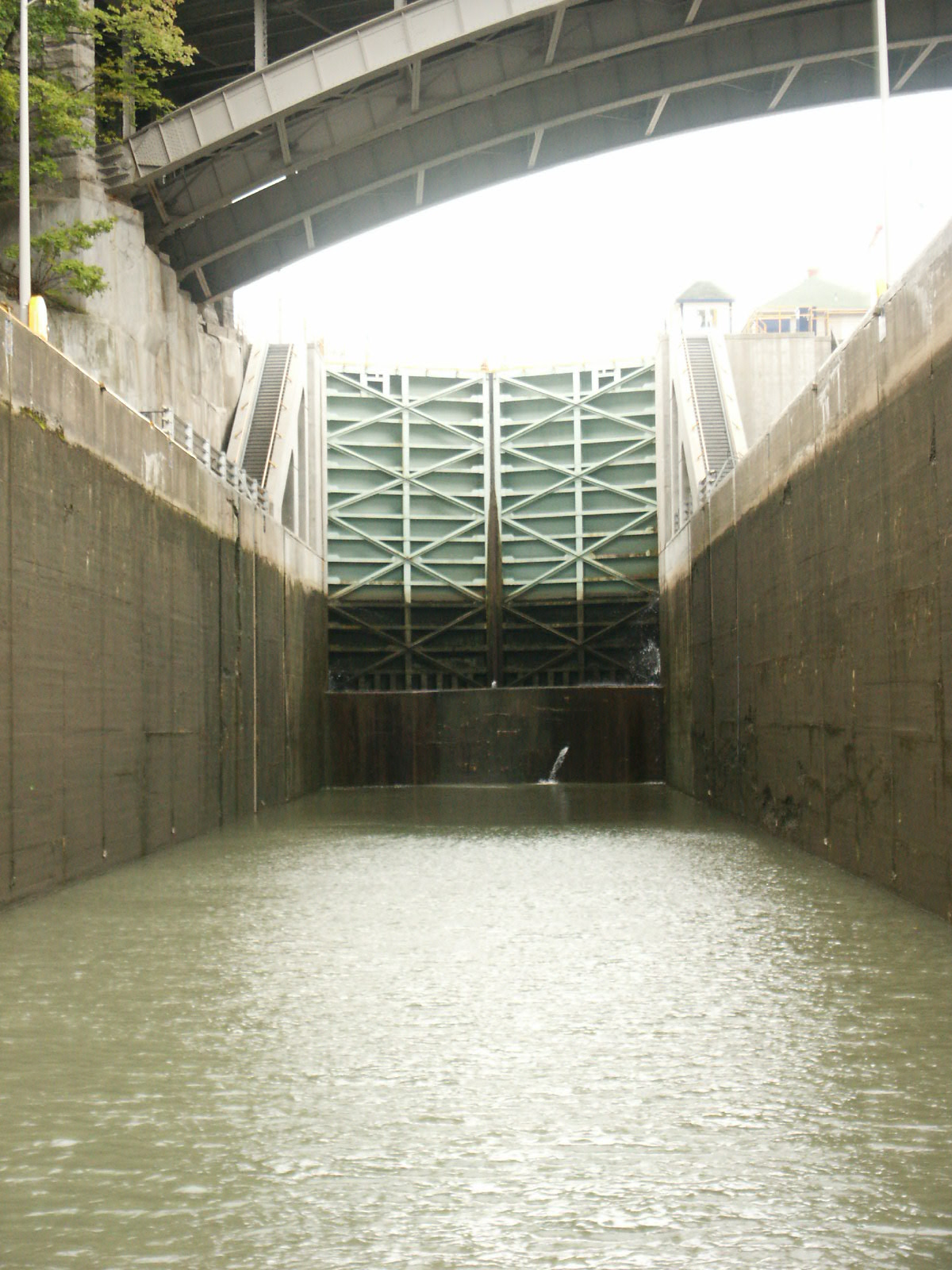
One of the new steel locks – 24.5-foot (7.5m) lift

Some people of note who have resided in Lockport are:

- Maltbie Davenport Babcock, clergyman
- John J. Bagley, former governor of Michigan
- Raphael Beck (1848–1947), artist, sculptor
- John Beilein, former collegiate and professional basketball coach
- John Black, former mayor of Milwaukee
- William W. Campbell, former New York state senator
- Lot Clark, former US congressman
- Richard Crowley, former US congressman
- Oliver Dyer, first Congressional shorthand reporter
- Brent Nicholson Earle, AIDS activist
- Lewis Eaton, former US congressman
- Timothy E. Ellsworth, former New York state senator
- Thomas T. Flagler, former US congressman
- David Gibson, Canadian politician
- Geoffrey Giuliano, author, actor and syndicated radio host
- William G. Gregory, NASA astronaut
- Herbert C. Harrison, sometimes credited with the invention of the modern honeycomb automobile radiator and founder of Harrison Radiator, now a part of General Motors' components division
- William Hawley, Union Army Brigadier General
- Birdsill Holly, inventor, credited with inventing the first integrated fire hydrant system along with 150 U.S. patents, many related to the Holly Steam Combination Company
- Mark Hopkins, Jr., 1813–1878, lawyer and businessman who lived in Reynales Basin (east of Gasport in Niagara County) and later Lockport from c. 1829 to c. 1848; eventually became one of the "Big Four" of California (i.e. The Central Pacific Railroad) with partners Stanford, Crocker, and Huntington that was formed in 1861
- Washington Hunt, former governor of New York
- Michael Huskey, Medal of Honor recipient
- Tom Jolls, TV weatherman
- William R. Kenan, Jr., businessman
- Benajah Mallory, Upper Canada political figure
- William E. Miller, American prosecutor at Nuremberg War-Crimes trials; member of United States House of Representatives 1951–1965; Republican National Committee Chairman 1961–1964; Republican Party Vice President nominee on 1964 Goldwater-Miller ticket; only practicing Catholic to be nominated for national office by the party until Paul Ryan in 2012; later starred in American Express "Do you know me?" commercials
- Charles F. Mitchell, former US congressman
- Aaron Albert Mossell, first African American to graduate from the University of Pennsylvania Law School
- Jeremy O'Day, retired CFL player
- Chauncey Olcott, stage actor and songwriter, known for the ballad "When Irish Eyes Are Smiling"; Olcott spent summers as a youth in Lockport in an "Irish shanty" with his maternal grandmother
- Charles Gilbert Peterson, former mayor and contractor
- Gilbert Peterson, contractor of multiple waterworks and reservoirs projects along with expansion of the Erie Canal; superintendent of both the Western and Eastern divisions of the Erie Canal
- Jesse Peterson, presidential elector and industrialist, president of the United Indurated Fibre Company
- Lyman C. Pettit, founder and first president of the Pentecostal Collegiate Institute (now Eastern Nazarene College)
- Thomas Stinson, Hamilton, Ontario, businessman
- The Seven Sutherland Sisters, long-haired singing group traveling with Barnum and Bailey's "Greatest Show on Earth"
- Burt Van Horn, former US congressman
- Thomas Wall, Wisconsin businessman and state legislator
- Samuel Works, former New York state senator

== Notable businesses ==
- Yahoo operates a large data center to the west of the city.
- First Niagara Bank, founded in 1870 as Farmers & Mechanics Savings Bank, has grown to include branches throughout New York and Pennsylvania and, with the April 2011 acquisition of NewAlliance Bank based in New Haven, Connecticut, is one of the largest regional banks in the country.
- General Motors, Lockport was founded in 1910 as the Harrison Radiator Company for the purpose of designing, manufacturing, and selling automotive radiators and components. Since that time the company has flourished into a lean manufacturing site that produces a wide array of Powertrain Cooling and HVAC components and systems. The company has historically been a significant employer of the local population and currently employs almost 1400 people.
- The Palace Theatre a neoclassical theatre, was constructed by Charles Dickinson beginning in 1922 and opening July 18, 1925. During opening, Lock City Theater Company President A. Edmund Lee was quoted as saying it was "built not for the aristocracy, but for all the people.” It is designed with a mix of art deco and Italian Renaissance styles complete with wall and ceiling murals. The theatre underwent an interior redesign in 1936, with John Eberson as the architect. In 1969, the Palace Theatre closed its doors, and it stood vacant until it was bought by Granchelli Real Estate in 1972. Although there was talk of demolishing the theatre, the Palace reopened later that same year "under either direct or indirect management of the Dipson Theatres chain." The theatre underwent restorations in 1973, and it reopened in 1974. By 1999 profits started to dwindle as other businesses began to leave Lockport's downtown area and patrons became less frequent. Later that same year, "Curtain Up Productions" leased the space until 2003, when the theatre was sold to Historic Palace Theatre Inc., a community-based not-for-profit organization which has maintained its commitment to keeping the theatre active. In 2021, the Palace Theatre finished its most recent restoration project at a cost of $4.1 million, with "$600,000 coming through Lockport's Downtown Revitalization Initiative award."
- General Motors operates a large manufacturing plant where Harrison Radiator Corporation was to the west of the city

== See also ==
- Erie Canal, with a description of the canal lock structures located here
- Niagara Escarpment, an extensive and abrupt change in elevation which the Niagara river crosses, forming Niagara Falls
- Lift bridge, illustrating bridges crossing the canal here
- Lockport Cave
