= Stickney House (Lockport, New York) =

Historic house in New York, United States

- U.S. National Register of Historic Places
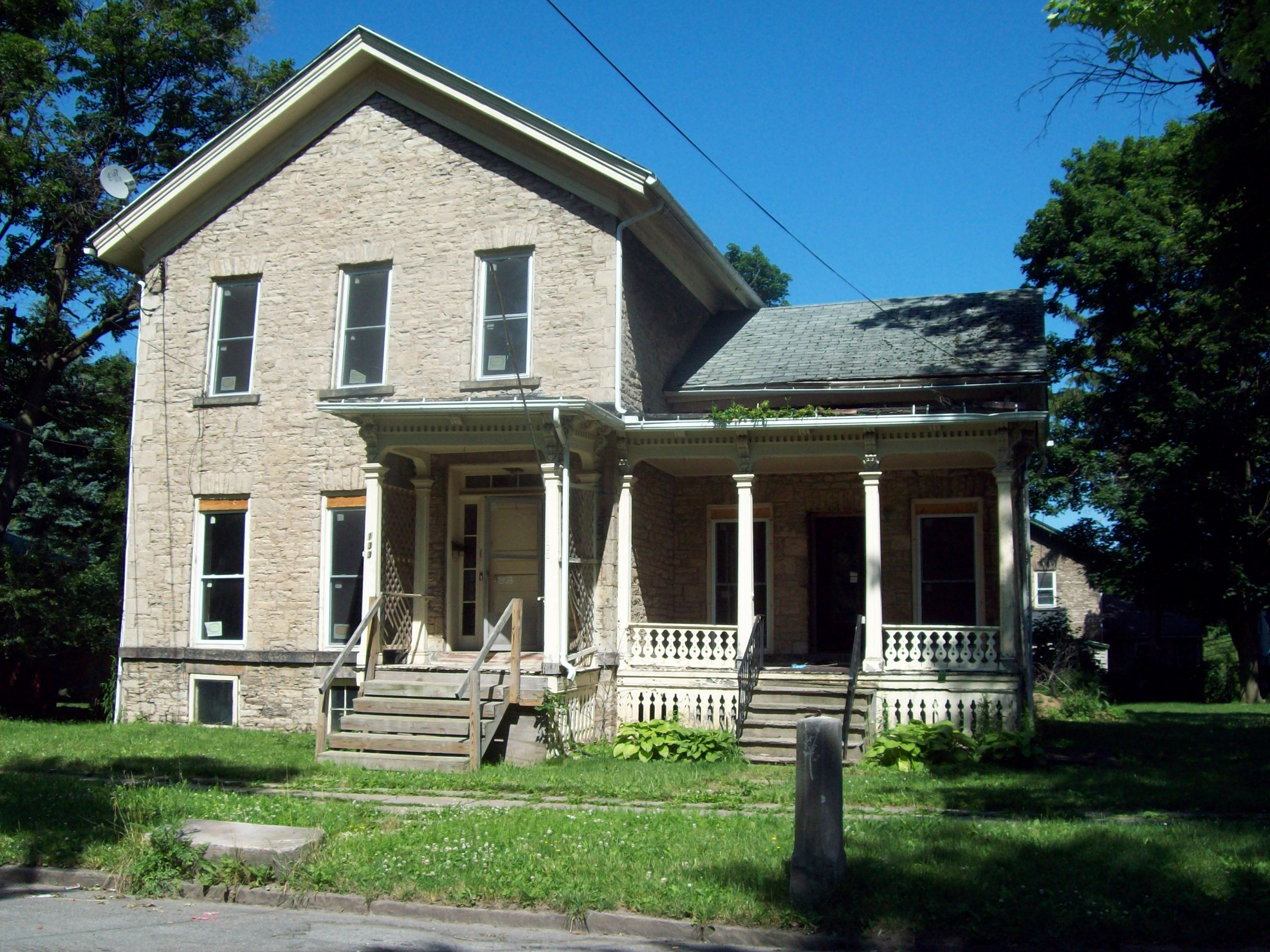
- Stickney House, June 2009

- Location within New York Location within the United States
- Interactive map showing the location of Stickney House
- Location: 133 Lock St., Lockport, New York
- Coordinates: 43°10′20″N 78°41′33″W
- Built: 1854
- Architectural style: Italianate
- MPS: Stone Buildings of Lockport, New York MPS
- NRHP reference No.: 03000483
- Added to NRHP: May 30, 2003

Stickney House is a historic home located at Lockport in Niagara County, New York. It is a two-story stone structure built in 1854 by Marcus Stickney, an early settler of Lockport, in the Italianate style. It is one of approximately 75 stone residences remaining in the city of Lockport.

In 1836, Marcus Stickney, an abolitionist, bought the property where this house is currently located. He was born in Ithaca and served as postmaster. Stickney moved to nearby Lewiston and started a mercantile store, then moved to Lockport and opened another store. His son Washington inherited the property in 1846 and the house was built several years later.

It was listed on the National Register of Historic Places in 2003.
