= Niagara County Courthouse and County Clerk's Office =

- U.S. National Register of Historic Places
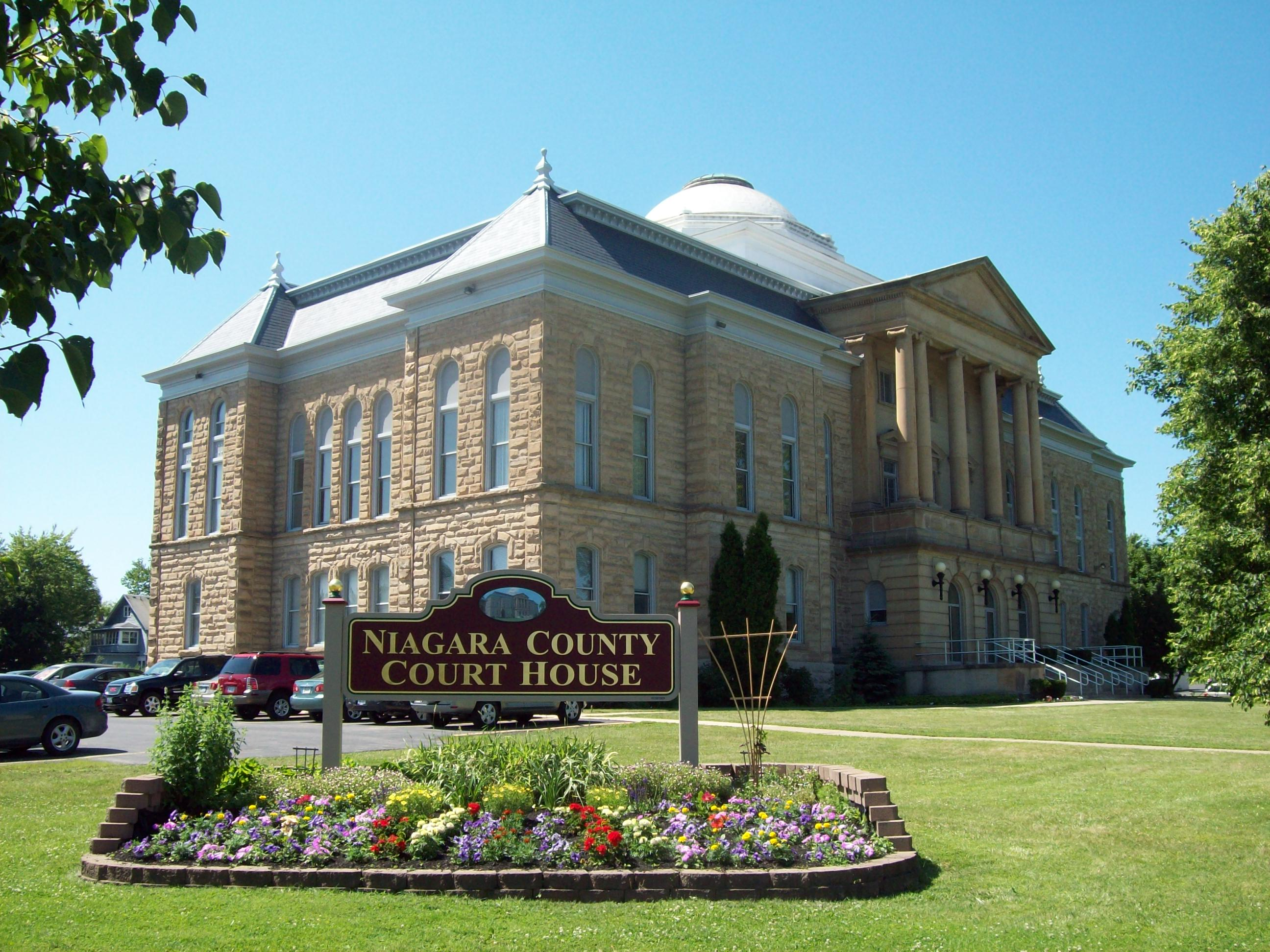
- Niagara County Courthouse, June 2009

- Location within New York Location within the United States
- Interactive map showing the location for Niagara County Courthouse & County Clerk’s Office
- Location: 175 Hawley St. and 139 Niagara St., Lockport, New York
- Coordinates: 43°10′10″N 78°42′3″W
- Built: 1856
- Architect: multiple
- Architectural style: Classical Revival
- NRHP reference No.: 97000417
- Added to NRHP: May 9, 1997

Niagara County Courthouse and County Clerk's Office is a historic courthouse and county clerk's building located at Lockport in Niagara County, New York. The two buildings are located along Hawley Street, north and south of Niagara Street. The county clerk's building is a one-story, limestone office building constructed in 1856 in the Classical Revival style. The original section of the courthouse building was constructed in 1886 in the Second Empire style, with additions constructed in 1915–1917 and 1955–1958.

It was listed on the National Register of Historic Places in 1997.

== Gallery ==
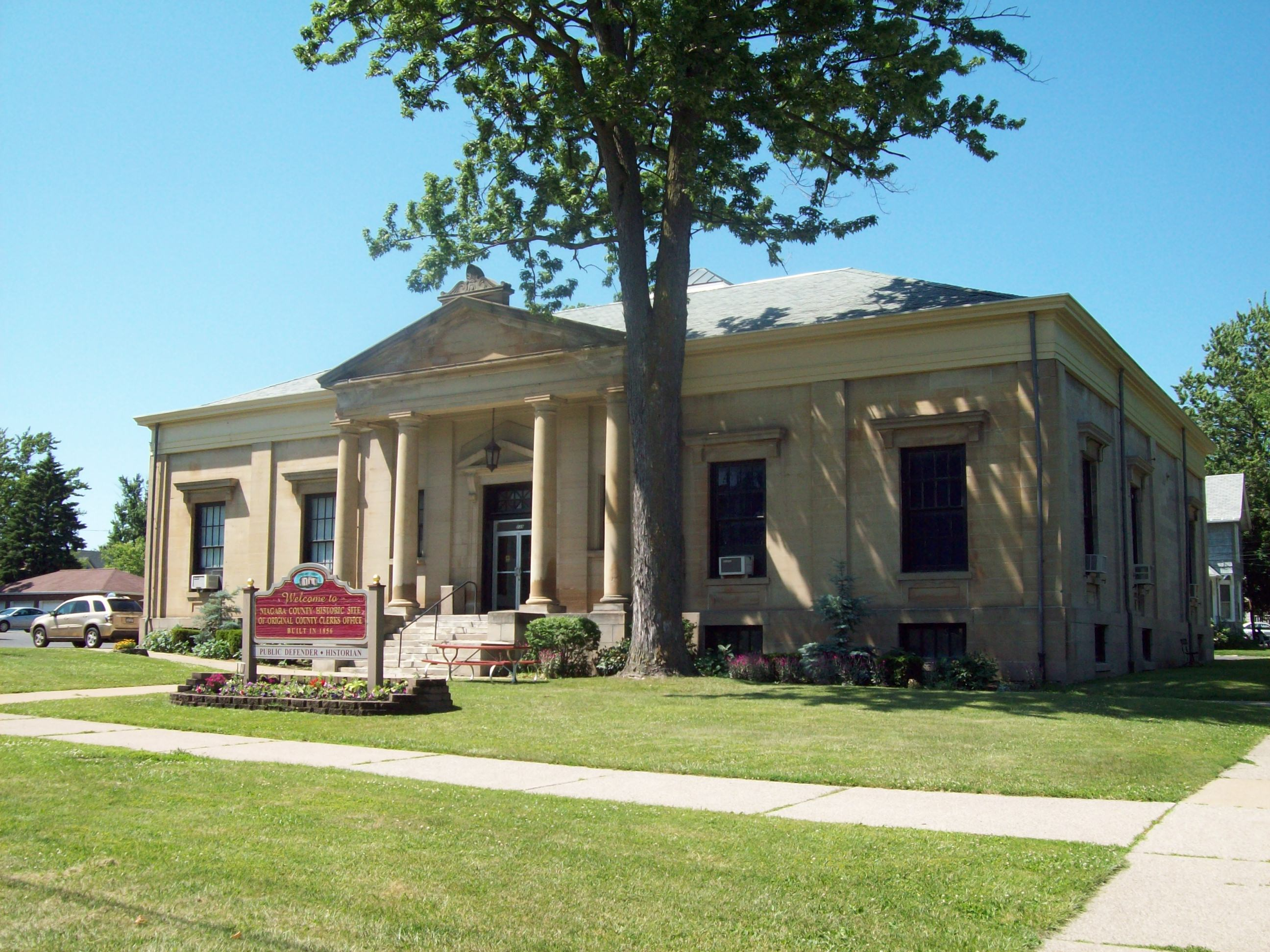
Niagara County Clerk's Office, June 2009
