= Union Station (Lockport, New York) =

Lockport
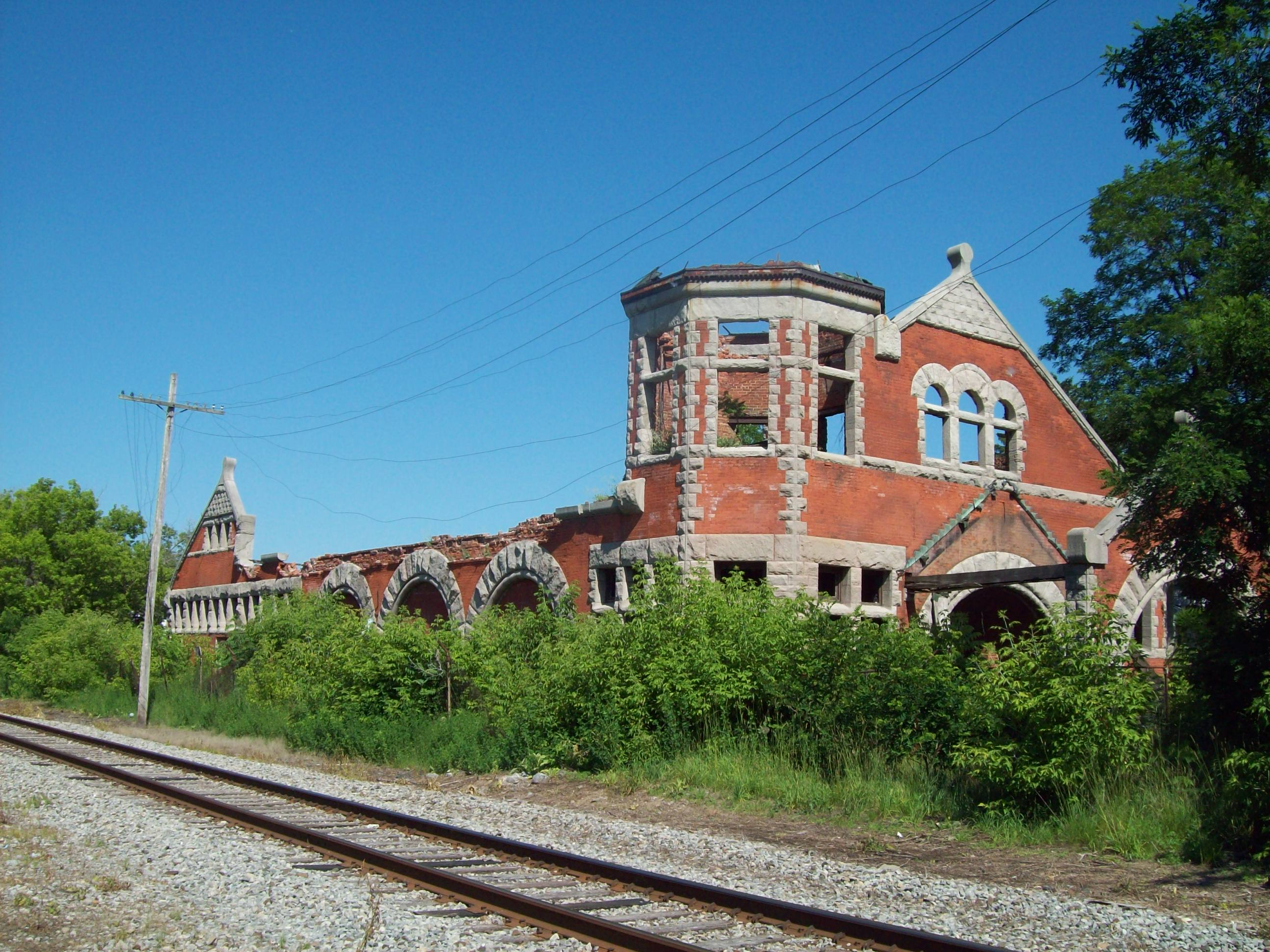
- Lockport station in June 2009.

General information
- Location: 95 Union Street, Lockport city, New York
- Coordinates: 43°10′26″N 78°41′08″W
- Line: Falls Road
- Tracks: 2 (historically); 1 (current)

History
- Closed: 1957
- Rebuilt: 1889

Former services
Preceding station	New York Central Railroad	Following station
Sanborn toward Niagara Falls, New York	Falls Road	Gasport toward Rochester
- Union Station
- U.S. National Register of Historic Places
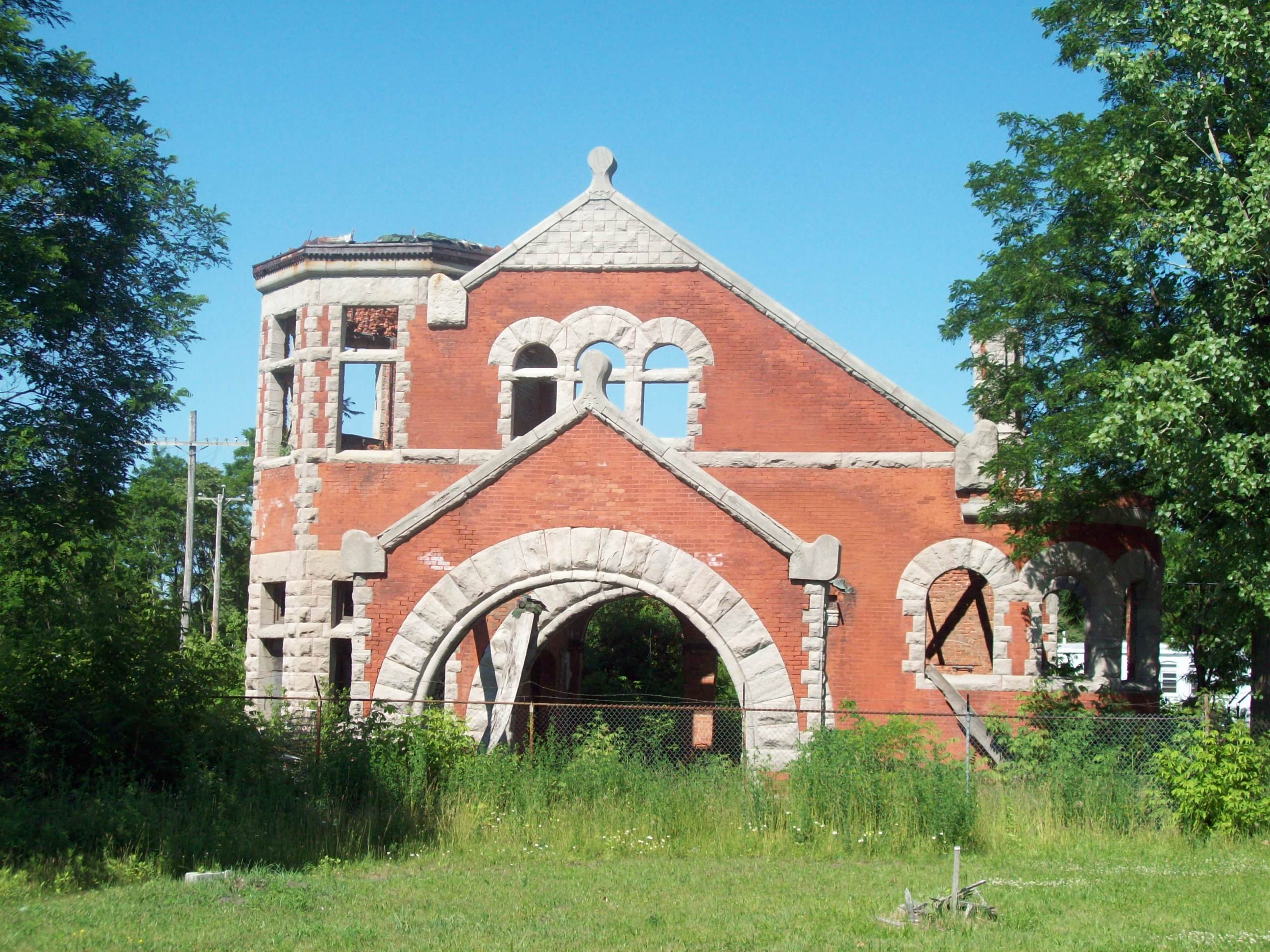
- The side of the abandoned depot in June 2009

- Location within New York Location within the United States
- Interactive map showing the location for Lockport Union Station
- Location: 95 Union Ave., Lockport, New York
- Coordinates: 43°10′26″N 78°41′8″W
- Built: 1889
- Architect: Houston, W.E.; Bendinger & Young
- Architectural style: Romanesque
- NRHP reference No.: 77000966
- Added to NRHP: December 02, 1977
Location

Union Station is the ruin of an historic former train station located at Lockport in Niagara County, New York. It was constructed in 1889, for the New York Central Railroad (NYC) in the Romanesque style. The station served the NYC Falls Road line, an east–west corridor connecting Niagara Falls and Rochester, New York. While technically not a "union station" - as no other railroad shared its facilities - it took its local name from its address on Union Street in Lockport.

There are conflicting sources regarding the architect of the station. According to the building's National Register of Historic Places (NRHP) registration, W. E. Houston and Bendinger & Young are the artictects. Another mentions John D. Fouquet who had designed several building for the NYC's Depew, New York yard. There is also local belief that it is a Stanford White design but the Lockport station is not listed among his known commissions. At its peak in the early twentieth century the station serviced 10-35 trains per day. The station was closed when passenger service on the line ended in 1957.

The building was unused until 1967. It was renovated and reopened as a restaurant in 1971. The restaurant was gutted by fire in December 1974, rebuilt and again destroyed by fire in 1978.

It was listed on the NRHP in 1977.

A private owner acquired the building in 2006 and spent approximately $250,000 on stabilization measures. The owner applied for grants to restore the building for mixed community use and as a heritage train station. In July 2025 ownership passed to a Buffalo-based investment group which intends to rebuild the station as office space.

The track alongside the station remains in active freight service and is owned by the Falls Road Railroad. The short-lived Niagara & Western New York ran a heritage operation between Lockport and Medina in 2002. As of 2023 the Medina Railroad Museum operated occasional heritage service to Lockport. In 1994, during Conrail ownership, twelve miles (19 km) of track connecting Brockport to Rochester, New York was abandoned. Consequently, the Falls Road route now terminates in Brockport, east of Owens Road at Mile Post 16.60.

== Gallery ==
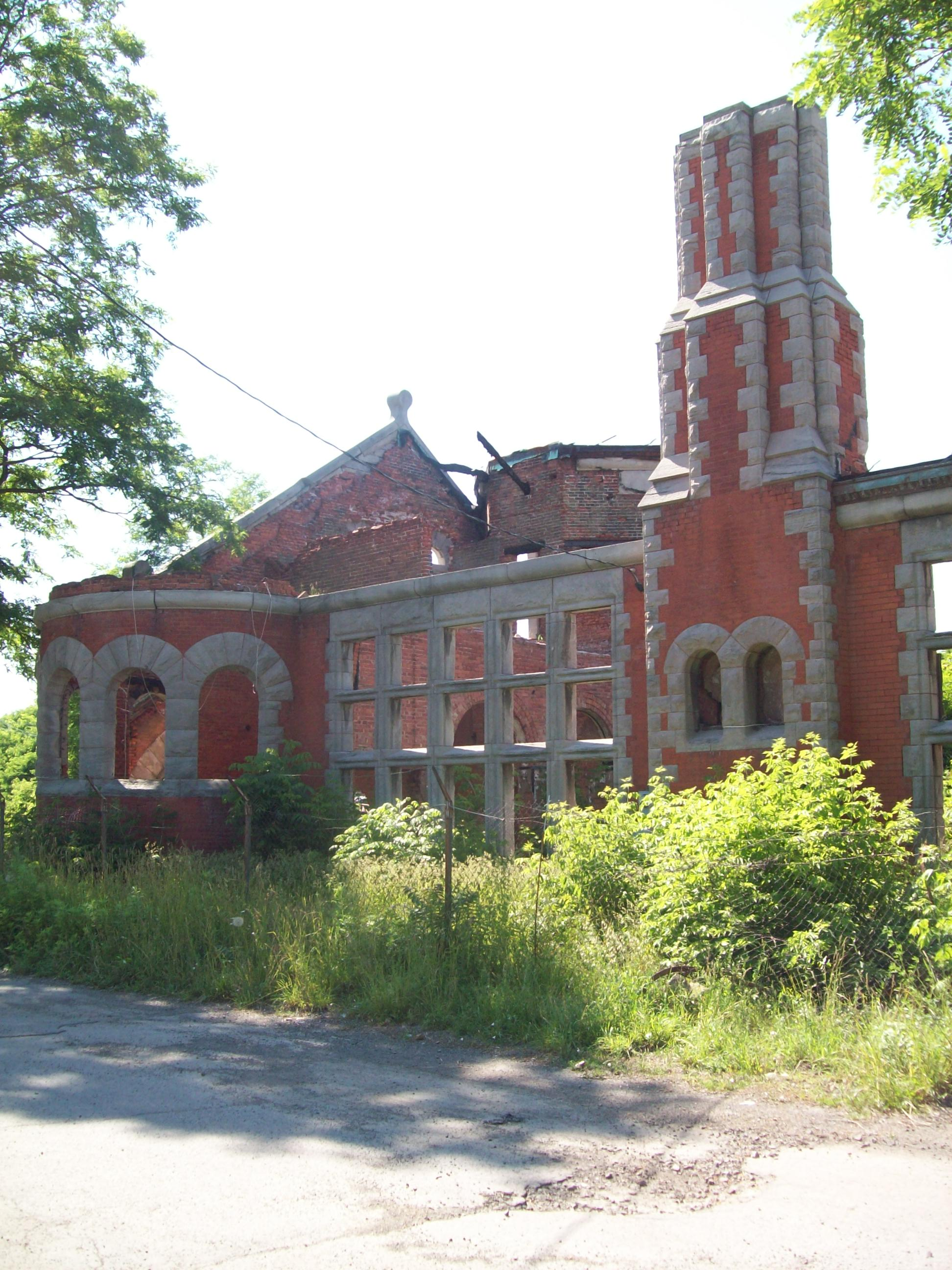
Union Station, Lockport, New York

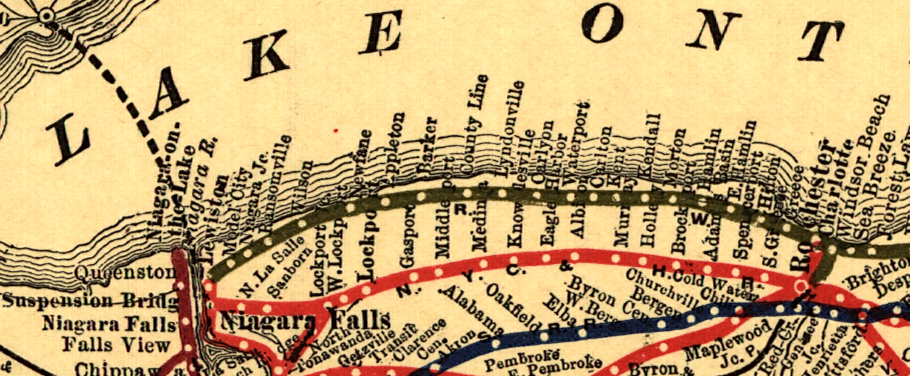
New York Central Falls Road line (red) from Niagara Falls to Rochester c. 1900.
