= White-Pound House =

Historic house in New York, United States

- U.S. National Register of Historic Places
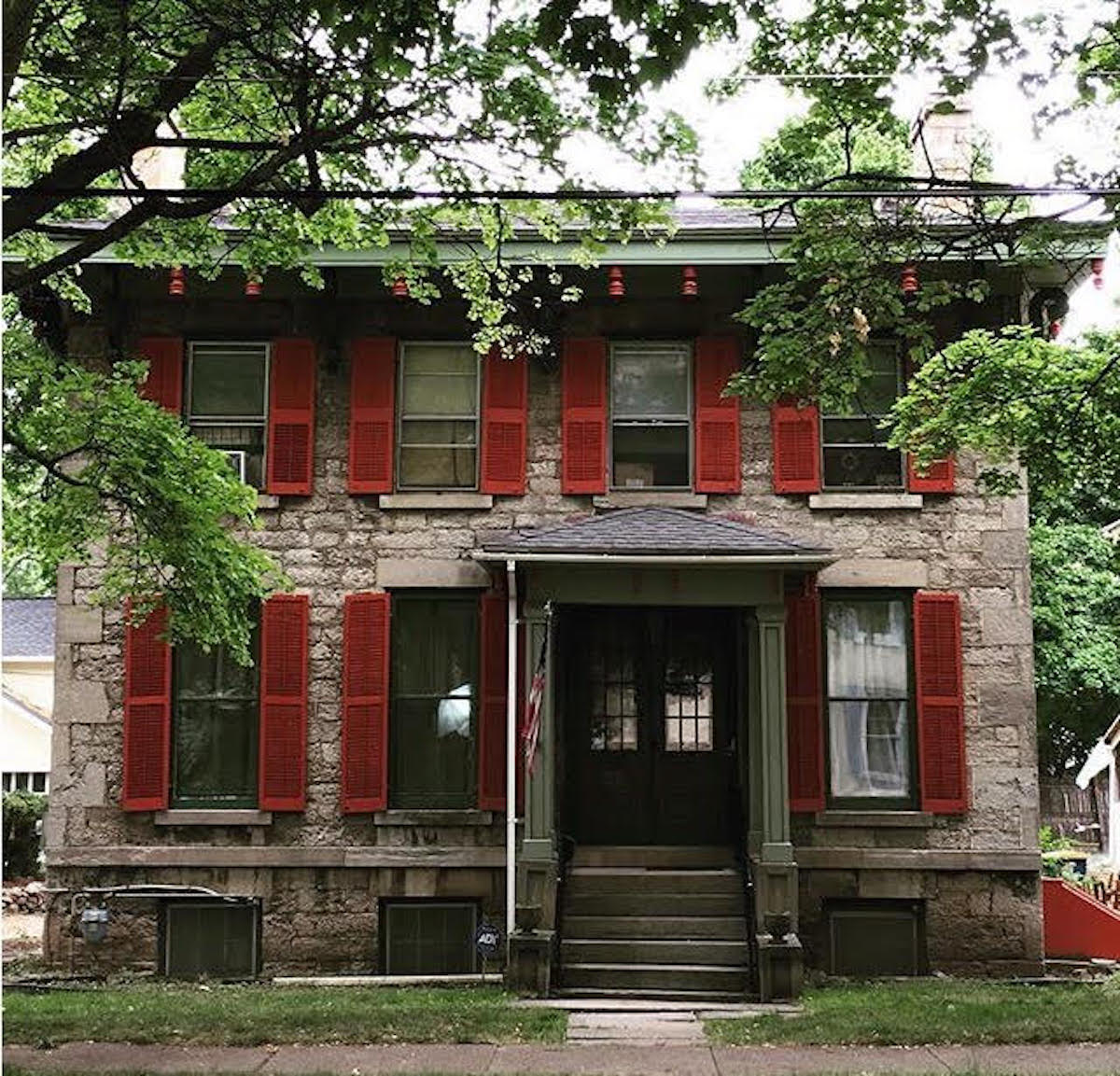
- The White-Pound house, 2016.

- Location within New York Location within the United States
- Location: Lockport, New York
- Coordinates: 43°9′58″N 78°41′31″W
- Built: 1835
- Architectural style: Italianate
- MPS: Stone Buildings of Lockport, New York MPS
- NRHP reference No.: 03000484
- Added to NRHP: May 30, 2003

White-Pound House is a historic home in Lockport in Niagara County, New York. The 2 1/2-story, 3,000+ square-foot stone structure was built in 1835 and remodeled in the Italianate style in the late nineteenth century. Today, the house retains its late nineteenth-century appearance on both its exterior and in its interior. The fine stone masonry workmanship, elaborate decorative detail and the high level of architectural integrity make the White-Pound house a prominent local landmark and an important example of Lockport's legacy of stone architecture. It is one of approximately 75 stone residences remaining in the city of Lockport.

== History ==
The White-Pound house was built in 1835. During the first thirteen years of its existence, the house's title was transferred many times. In 1848, Charles and Sophia Schulz sold the house to Robert and Martha C. White for $1,000, after which the house remained in the ownership of the same family for 125 years.

Born on June 26, 1818, in Washington County, New York, Robert White moved to Lockport in 1836 and began work as a retail clerk for Wilkinson & McMaster. In 1842, he entered in a partnership with Sumner Ballou to open his own grocery business. He died of "spasmodic croup" in 1865, leaving his widow, Martha, and three children. His obituary in the Lockport Daily Journal described him as a man of "large personal popularity, who was elected to represent the town on the County Board of Supervisors, at a time when his party was in the minority in the Town of Lockport... He was universally regarded as a faithful and capable public officer and a public-spirited and patriotic citizen..."

Martha White occupied the house until her death in 1910. She left the house in trust for her daughter Mary E. who made it her lifelong residence. After Mary E. White's death in 1940, residual legatees from Martha White's will rented the house. In 1948, the house's title was transferred to Donna Coates Pound. Pound's husband, Alexander White Pound, was a grandson of Robert and Martha White. Their daughter Emma was married to Judge Cuthbert Pound; thus Alexander White Pound was a descendant of one of Lockport's most prestigious families. Donna moved into the house after her husband died and remained in the house until 1972. After Donna's death, the house was sold outside of the family.

The house experienced two significant alterations during the nineteenth century. The first, probably completed in the late 1850s, included the entrance porch, elongated window openings at the first-floor street facade, the hip roof, extended eaves, scroll brackets, and pendants. The second, completed in about 1880, included the current entrance doors, the present fireplace mantles and the second-floor frame addition at the rear wing. Both renovations included work to update the house's appearance. The first renovation transformed the house with picturesque architectural elements associated with the Italianate architectural style popularized by landscape designer Andrew Jackson Downing. The rear wing's incised detailing, bull's eye corner blocks and trim are typical of the machine produced millwork contemporary of the Eastlake architectural style. The changes illustrate the evolution of popular taste through the nineteenth century. The White-Pound house is significant under the National Register Criterion C as an important example of Lockport's mid-nineteenth-century domestic architecture. The refined masonry treatment at the house's main facade is enhanced by prominent beaded joints dressed stonework at the base of the entry porch.

The White-Pound house is south of the city's central business district, on the east side of Pine Street. The surrounding residential neighborhood contains early to late nineteenth-century houses. Although most houses are wood-frame construction, the surrounding block has several other stone houses.

The White-Pound house is on a level 66 foot wide by 119 foot deep lot. A walk of Gasport Limestone slabs connects the public sidewalk to the house's entrance porch. A concrete driveway is on the house's north side. A modern, wood, three-foot high stockade fence is at the rear of the back yard.

== Exterior ==
The White-Pound house is a hip roof, 2 1/2-story, Gasport Limestone, Italianate-style house. A two-story wing projects from the rear of the house. Gasport Limestone lintels and sills are used on the building's facades. The dressed water table, above the three-foot high ashlar-faced exposed foundation wall, occurs only at the street facade. Large dressed ashlar Gasport Limestone quoins reinforce the house's corners.

The house's four-bay, west-facing front facade is made of grey Gasport Limestone laid in quarry-face ashlar with beaded mortar joints. The facade's regular arrangement of openings incorporates four second-story windows aligned above taller first-floor windows. The windows retain nineteenth-century wood one-over-one double-hung sash and operable louvered shutters. Six-light sash cellar windows are below the water table. Double entrance doors and a single-bay porch occupy the right center bay of the facade. The porch's treads and cheek walls are made of dressed Gasport Limestone blocks. The square porch posts with abstracted capitals and plinths appear to date from the early twentieth century. The porch's hip roof has broad projecting eaves adorned with regularly spaced pairs of turned pendants. The tall, narrow porch entrance doors incorporate three-quarter height glass lights, molded trim and bull's-eye corner blocks. Early twentieth-century storm doors, with removable twelve-light sash, are installed at the exterior face of the main doors.

The house's north and south facades are made of uncoursed rubble. The south wall is devoid of window openings. The north wall has been parged.

At roof level, the eaves extend nearly three feet beyond the face of the wall below. The bays are marked with large scroll brackets. The eaves are embellished by regularly spaced turned pendants. Above the south and north walls are two symmetrical pairs of stone chimneys.

The first floor of the rear wing is made of stone matching the detailing of the main block. The wood-frame second floor of the wing appears to be a late nineteenth-century addition.

== Interior ==
The White/Pound house's interior survives with a relatively high degree of integrity of design, materials and craftsmanship. Most rooms retain original plaster finishes, base moldings, casings and four-panel doors. The original room configuration survives intact.

The house's front entrance leads to the main hall and an open stair along its left wall. The stair handrail terminates in a shepherd's crook above a turned newel. The turned handrail spindles have a plain tapered profile. The handrail spindles and newel have a dark natural finish. South of the hall is a small sitting room connected to a bedroom in the rear. North of the hall are the main parlor and the dining room, connected by a large doorway. The kitchen and utility spaces are in the rear wing. All the primary first-floor rooms incorporate wide plank hardwood floors, ten-foot ceilings, four-panel doors, wide shouldered Greek Revival casings and simple but wide wood base boards. The interior doorways incorporate paneled casings with corner blocks. The dining room and main parlors contain matching black marble Eastlake style fireplace mantles with decorative incising, coal grates and encaustic tile hearths. The mantle's wide proportions suggest their appearance is the result of a ca. 1880 adaptation of a preexisting mantle.

One of the house's most significant features is a well-preserved early kitchen in the cellar below the main parlor. A simple open stair with chambered and tapered square newel and square spindles descends from the first floor to the kitchen. The room retains its original plain six-panel doors, wainscoting, beaded Federal-era casings, plaster walls and ceiling and fir plank floor. At the room's north wall is a cooking fireplace and baking oven. The fireplace retains a federal mantle, andirons and crane. The firebox opening and the heath are made of large dressed blocks of Gasport Limestone. The adjacent baking over in constructed of brick.

The house was listed on the National Register of Historic Places in 2003 after undergoing detailed preservation by Robert J. and Holly E. Keller.
