= Watson House (Lockport, New York) =

Historic house in New York, United States

- U.S. National Register of Historic Places
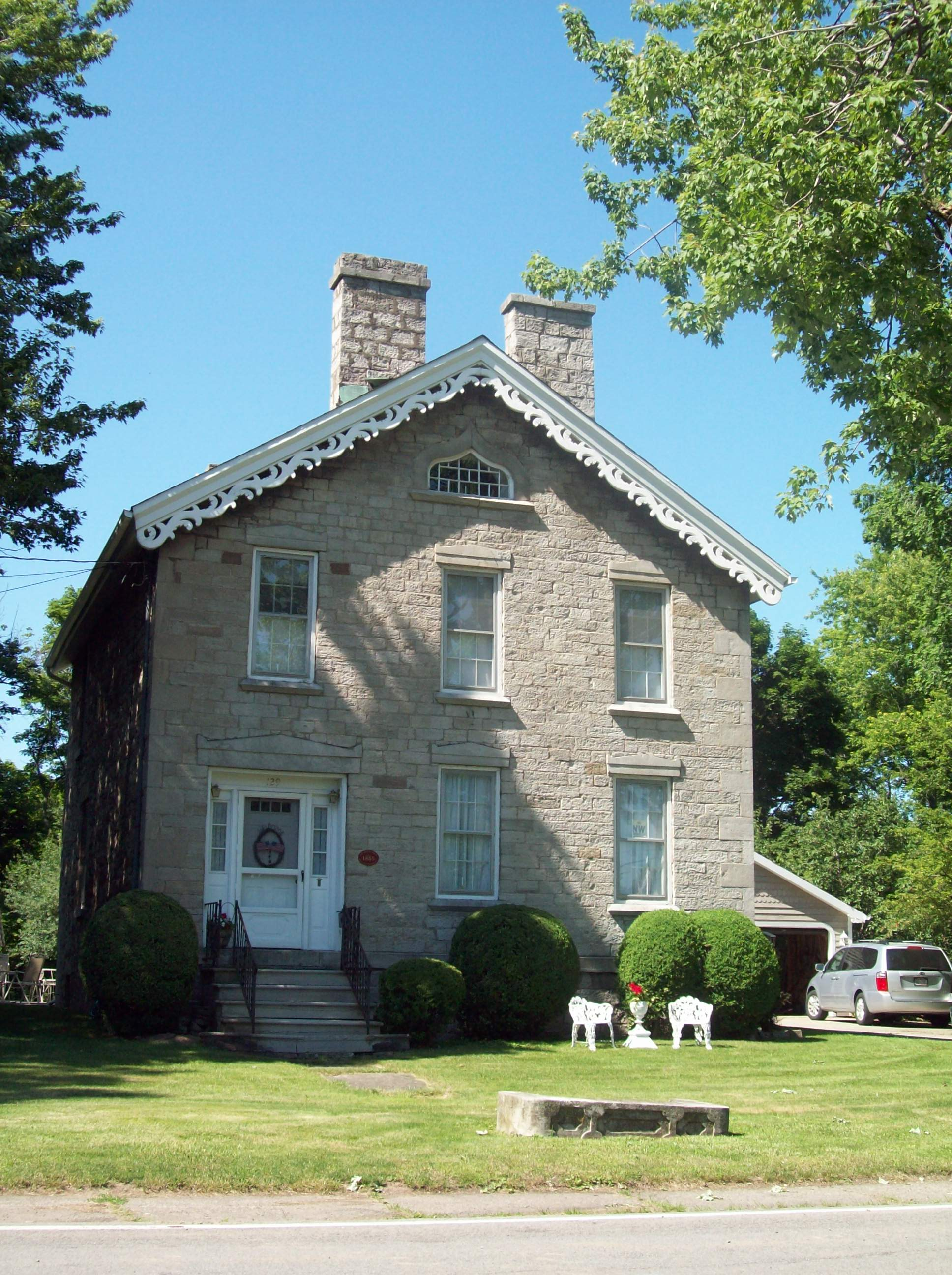
- Watson House, June 2009

- Location within New York Location within the United States
- Interactive map showing the location of Watson House
- Location: 129 Outwater Dr., Lockport, New York
- Coordinates: 43°10′48″N 78°42′8″W
- Built: 1854
- Architect: Watson, Thomas
- Architectural style: Gothic Revival
- MPS: Stone Buildings of Lockport, New York MPS
- NRHP reference No.: 03000486
- Added to NRHP: May 30, 2003

Watson House is a historic home located at Lockport in Niagara County, New York. It is a two-story stone structure built in 1854 in the Gothic Revival style by Thomas Watson, an early settler of Lockport. It is one of approximately 75 stone residences remaining in the city of Lockport. It was listed on the National Register of Historic Places in 2003.
