= Bacon-Merchant-Moss House =

Historic house in New York, United States

- U.S. National Register of Historic Places
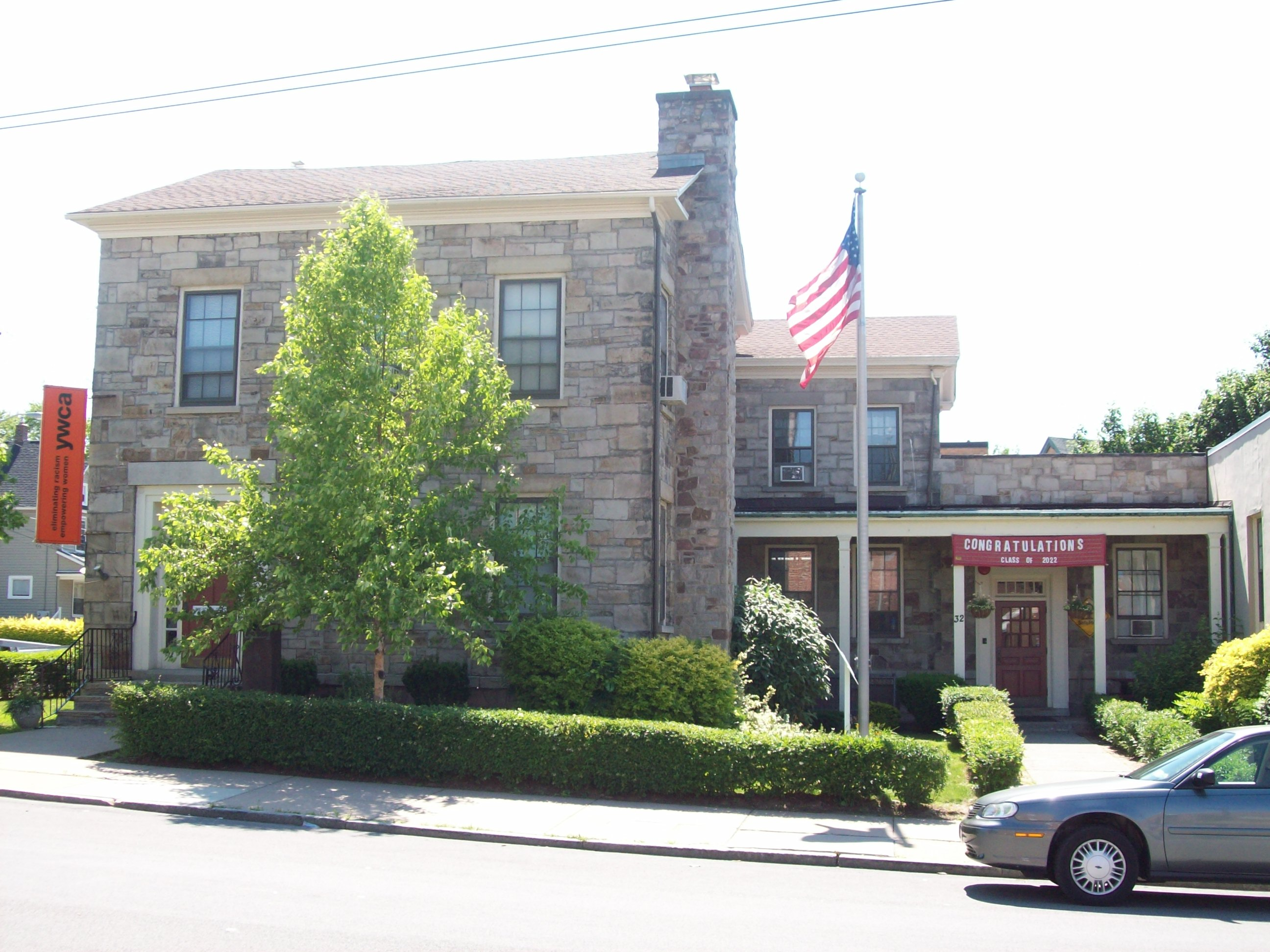
- Bacon-Merchant-Moss House, June 2009

- Location within New York Location within the United States
- Interactive map of Bacon-Merchant-Moss House
- Location: 32 Cottage St., Lockport, New York
- Coordinates: 43°10′5″N 78°41′40″W
- Built: 1832
- Architectural style: Federal
- MPS: Stone Buildings of Lockport, New York MPS
- NRHP reference No.: 07000481
- Added to NRHP: May 30, 2007

The Bacon-Merchant-Moss House is a historic house located at 32 Cottage Street in Lockport, New York.

== Description and history ==
It is a two-story, Federal style stone structure built in 1832. A narrow attic crawlspace is believed to have been used to hide slaves escaping to Canada on the Underground Railroad. The YWCA purchased the building in 1927, and it continues to be owned by that organization. It is one of approximately 75 stone residences remaining in the city of Lockport.

It was listed on the National Register of Historic Places on May 30, 2007.
