= Lockport Industrial District =

Historic district in New York, United States

- U.S. National Register of Historic Places
- U.S. Historic district
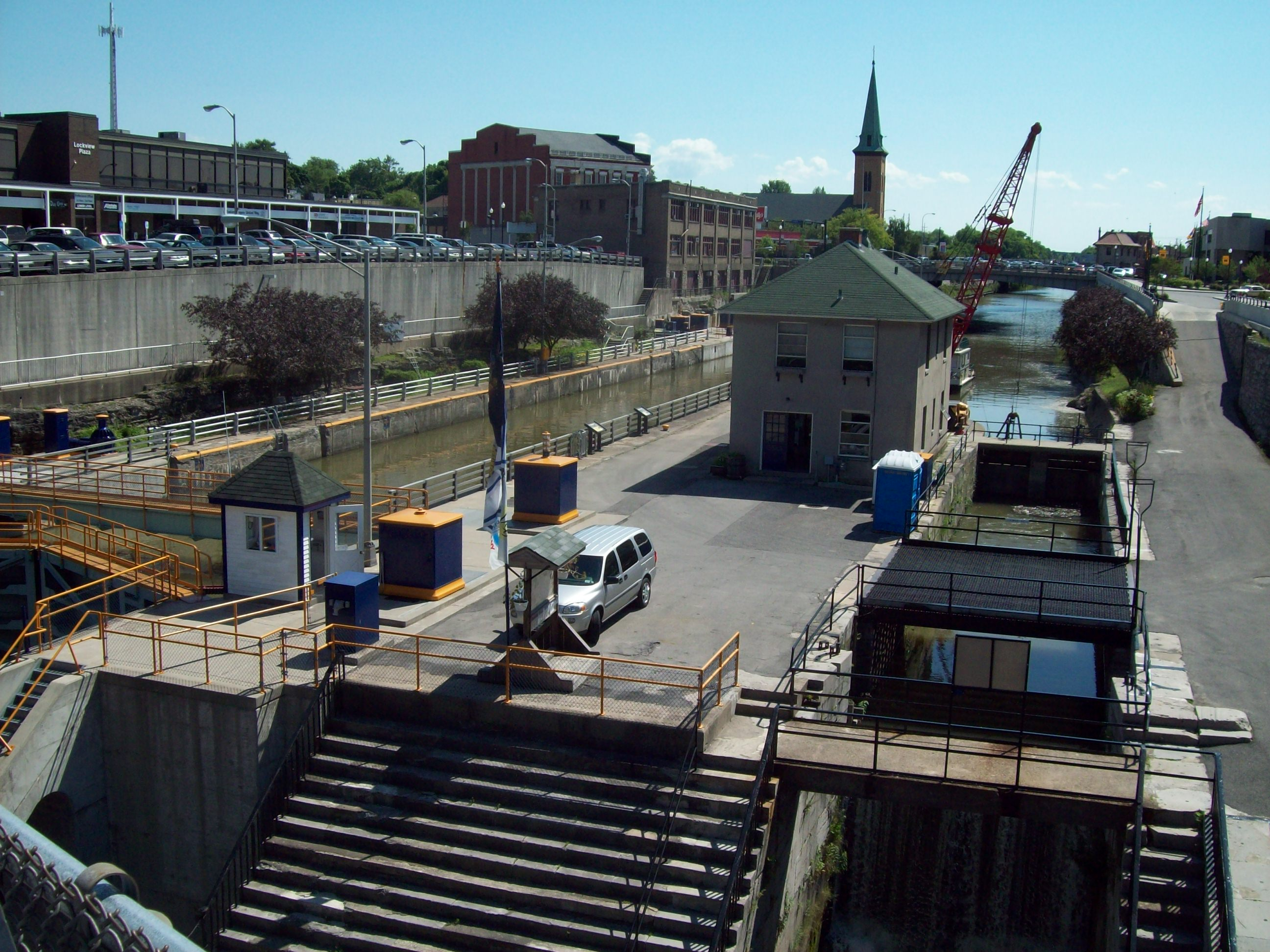
- Canal Locks at Lockport, New York, June 2009

- Location within New York Location within the United States
- Location: Bounded roughly by Erie Canal, Gooding, Clinton, and Water Sts., Lockport, New York
- Coordinates: 43°10′24″N 78°41′31″W
- Built: 1859
- Architect: Lockport Hydraulic Co.; Et al.
- NRHP reference No.: 75001211
- Added to NRHP: November 11, 1975

Lockport Industrial District is a national historic district located at Lockport in Niagara County, New York. The district features the two sets of Erie Canal locks constructed in 1859 and 1909–1918, respectively known as the Northern Tier and Southern Tier. Also in the district are the remains of industrial buildings built along the related hydraulic raceway along the north side of the canal.

It was listed on the National Register of Historic Places in 1975.
