= Pound–Hitchins House =

Historic house in New York, United States

- U.S. National Register of Historic Places
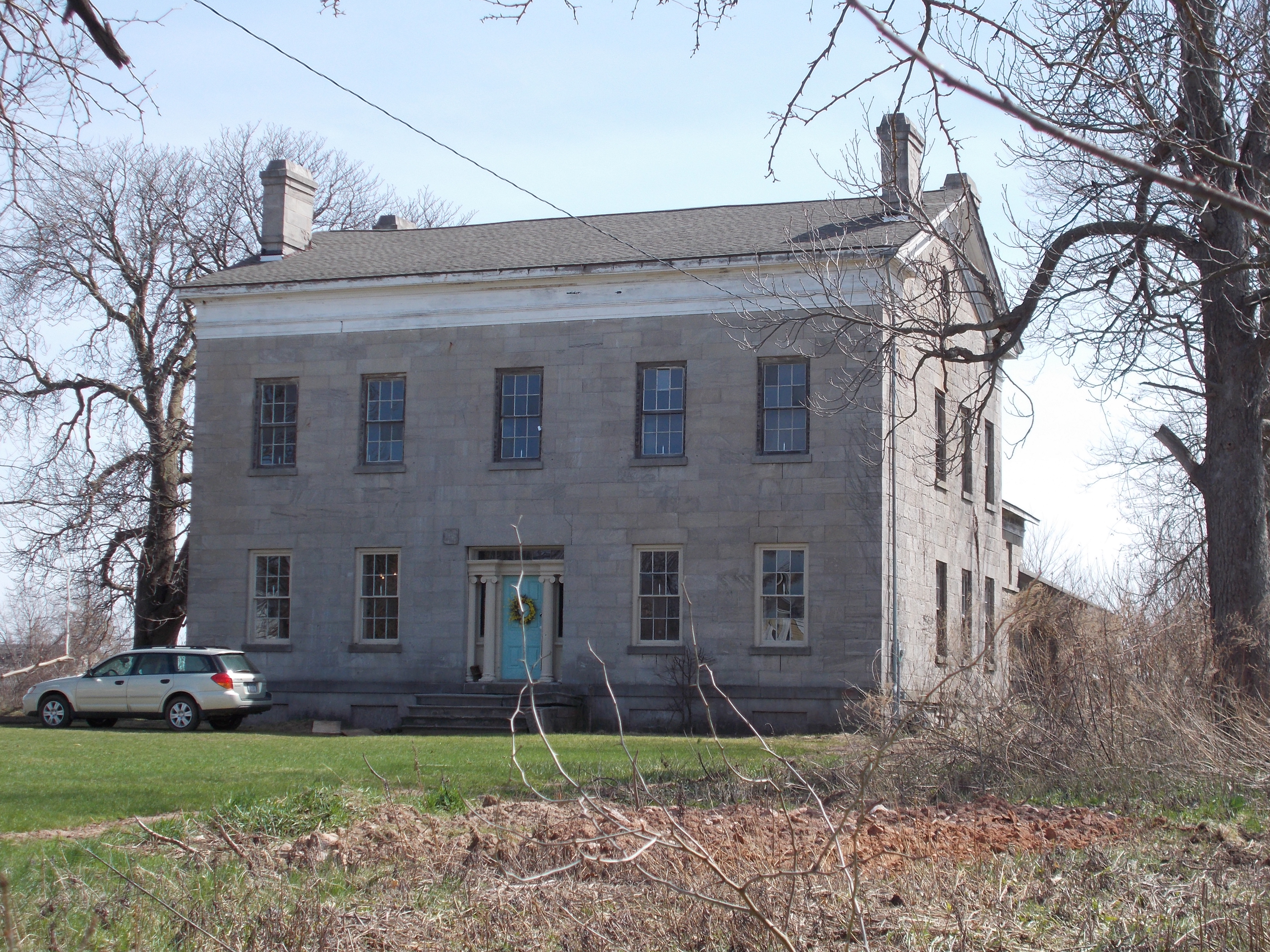
- Pound–Hitchins House, April 2015

- Location within New York Location within the United States
- Location: 325 Summit St., Lockport, New York
- Coordinates: 43°09′11″N 78°42′25″W
- Area: 18.25 acres (7.39 ha)
- Built: c. 1833, 1854, 1868, 1911
- Architectural style: Greek Revival
- MPS: Stone Buildings of Lockport, New York MPS
- NRHP reference No.: 14001215
- Added to NRHP: January 27, 2015

Pound–Hitchins House, also known as “Mount Providence” and Ruhlmann House, is a historic home located at Lockport, Niagara County, New York. It was built about 1833 and is a two-story, five-bay, Greek Revival style dwelling with a large two-story wing. It has a side-gable roof and end chimneys, and is constructed of large-block ashlar Gasport limestone. It features an elaborate central entry with an original six-panel wood door recessed slightly behind two engaged Ionic order columns in antis with sidelights and panels.

It was listed on the National Register of Historic Places in 2015.
