= Conkey House =

Historic house in New York, United States

- U.S. National Register of Historic Places
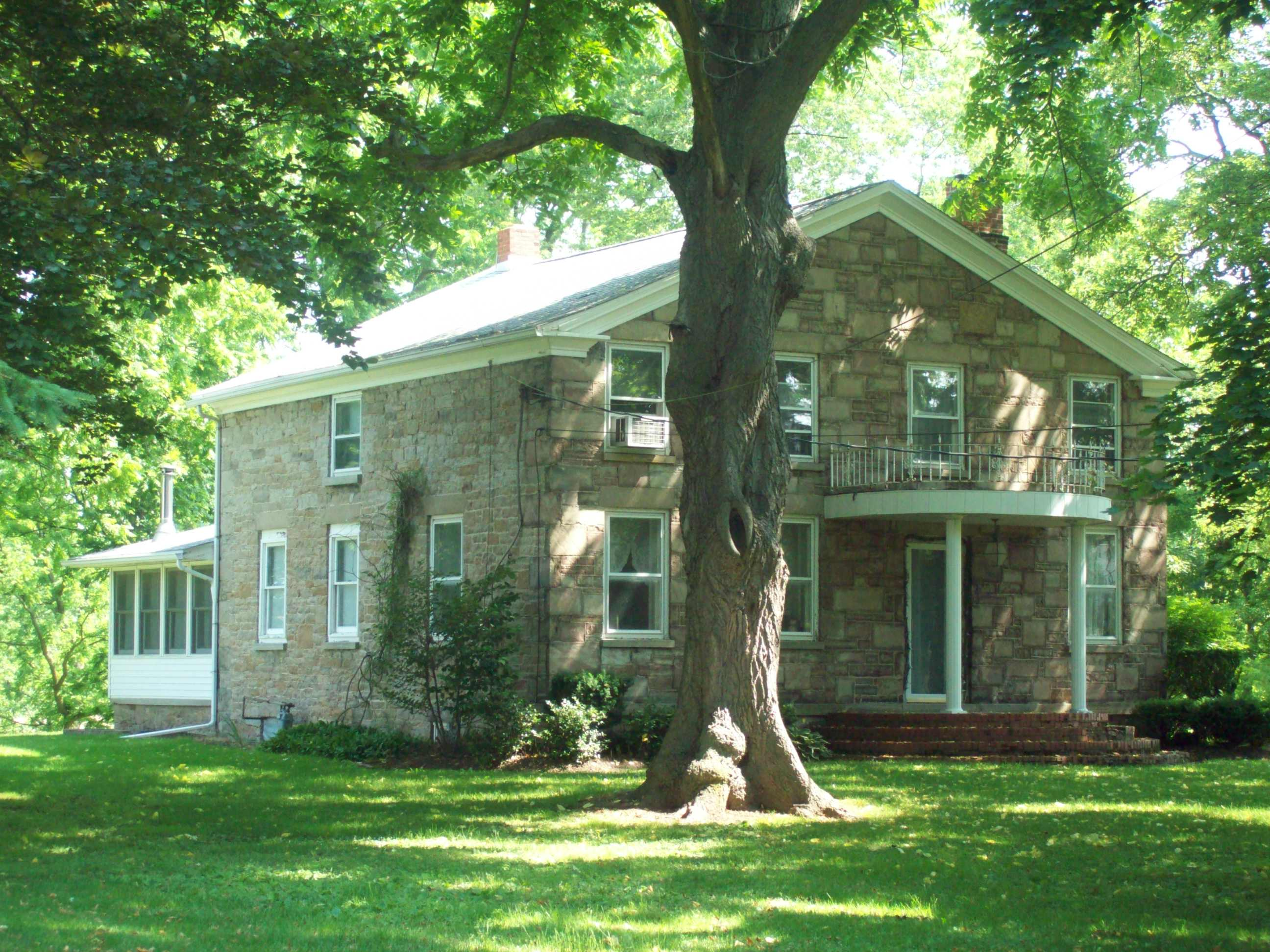
- Conkey House, June 2009

- Location within New York Location within the United States
- Location: 202 Akron St., Lockport, New York
- Coordinates: 43°9′43″N 78°40′9″W
- Built: 1842
- Architect: Conkey, James
- Architectural style: Greek Revival
- MPS: Stone Buildings of Lockport, New York MPS
- NRHP reference No.: 03000479
- Added to NRHP: May 30, 2003

The Conkey House is a historic home situated Lockport in Niagara County, New York. It is a stone structure built in 1842 in the Federal style by James Conkey, an early settler of Lockport. It was owned by his descendants until the 1960s. It is one of approximately 75 stone residences remaining in the city of Lockport.

It was listed on the National Register of Historic Places in 2003.
