= Hopkins House (Lockport, New York) =

Historic house in New York, United States

- U.S. National Register of Historic Places
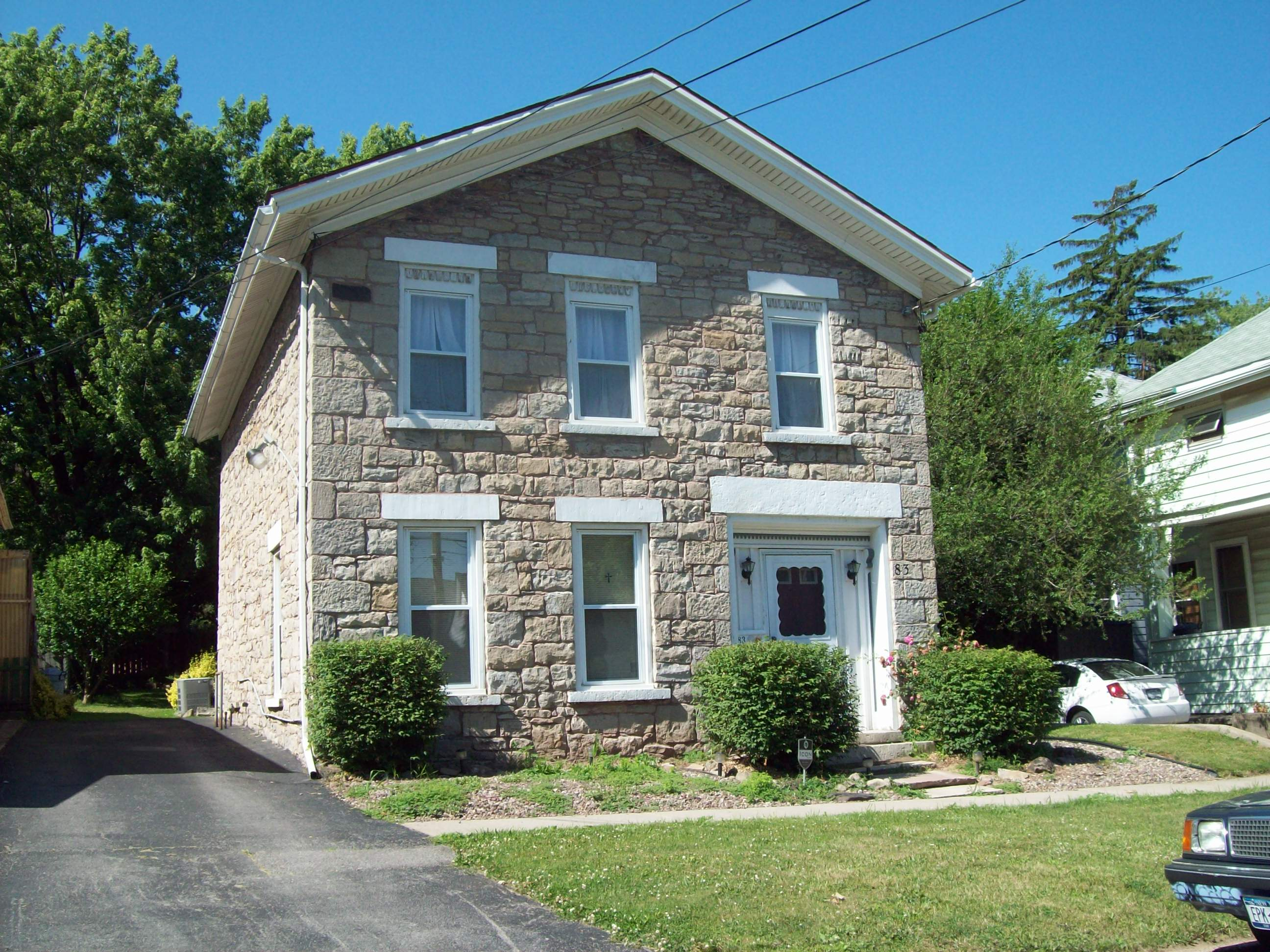
- Hopkins House, June 2009

- Location within New York Location within the United States
- Interactive map showing the location of Hopkins House
- Location: 83 Monroe St., Lockport, New York
- Coordinates: 43°10′39″N 78°41′39″W
- Built: 1833
- Architectural style: Greek Revival
- MPS: Stone Buildings of Lockport, New York MPS
- NRHP reference No.: 03000480
- Added to NRHP: May 30, 2003

Hopkins House is a historic home located at Lockport in Niagara County, New York. It is a two-story stone structure built in 1833 by John Hopkins, an Erie Canal engineer and early settler of Lockport, in the Greek Revival style. It was remodeled in about 1865 adding Italianate details. It is one of approximately 75 stone residences remaining in the city of Lockport.

It was listed on the National Register of Historic Places in 2003.
