= Peter D. Walter House =

Historic house in New York, United States

- U.S. National Register of Historic Places
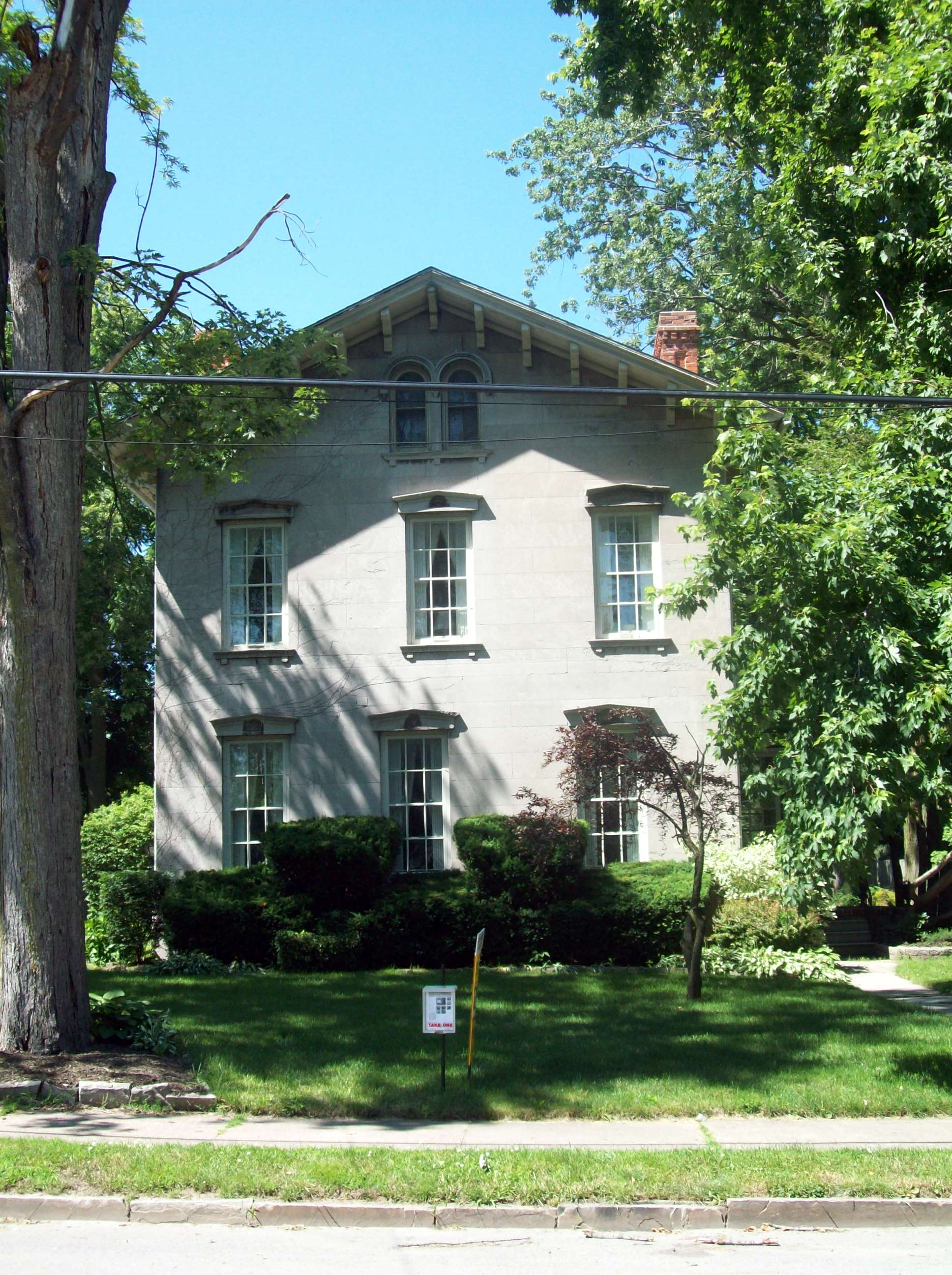
- Peter D. Walter House, June 2009

- Location within New York Location within the United States
- Interactive map showing the location of Peter D. Walter House
- Location: 127 Ontario St., Lockport, New York
- Coordinates: 43°10′16″N 78°41′54″W
- Built: 1858
- Architectural style: Italianate
- MPS: Stone Buildings of Lockport, New York MPS
- NRHP reference No.: 07000489
- Added to NRHP: May 30, 2007

Peter D. Walter House is a historic home located at Lockport in Niagara County, New York. It is a two-story stone structure built in 1858 by Peter D. Walter, seventh mayor of Lockport, in the Italianate style. It is one of approximately 75 stone residences remaining in the city of Lockport.

It was listed on the National Register of Historic Places in 2007.
