= Maloney House (Lockport, New York) =

Historic house in New York, United States

- U.S. National Register of Historic Places
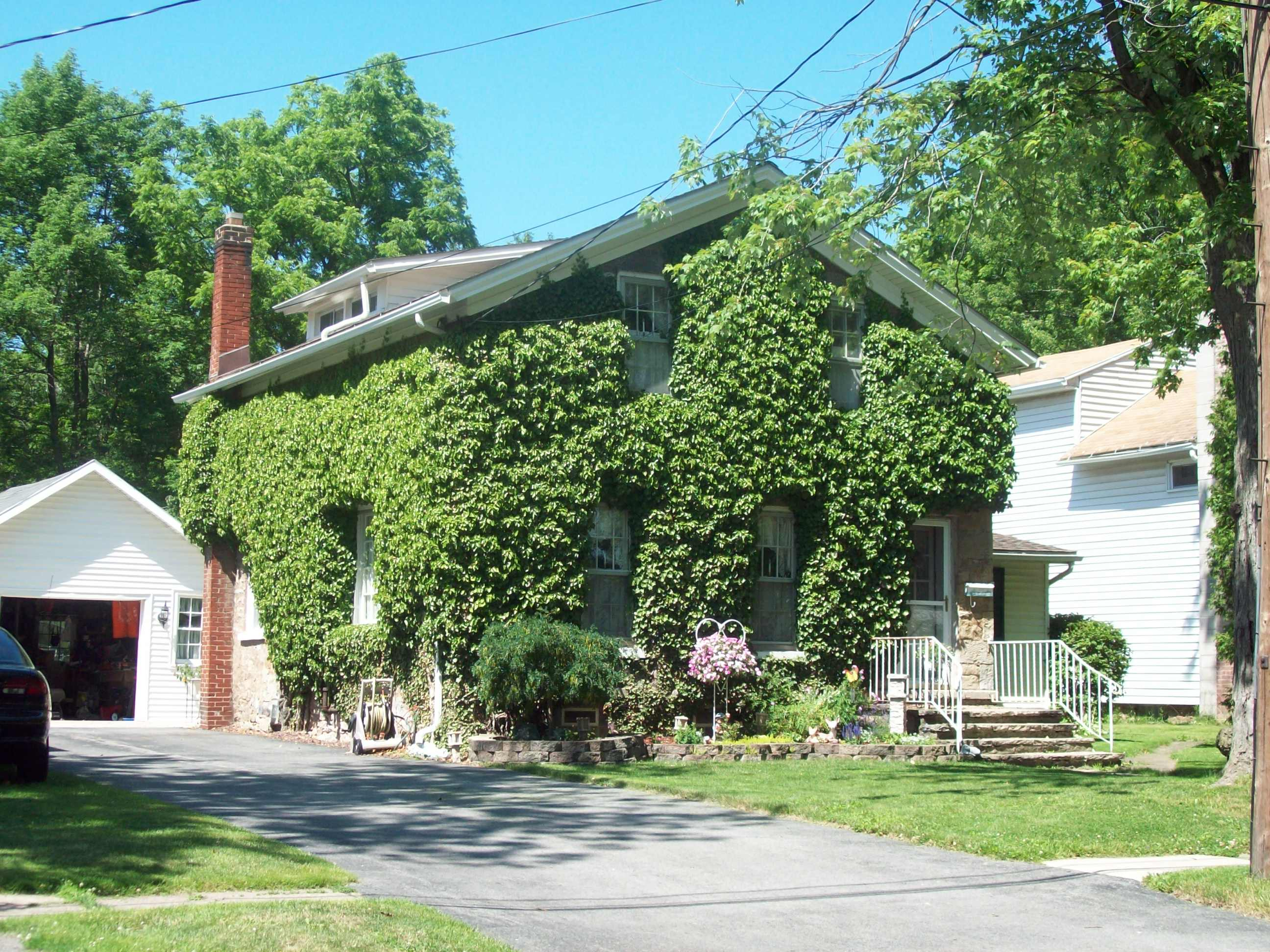
- Maloney House, June 2009

- Location within New York Location within the United States
- Location: 279 Caledonia St., Lockport, New York
- Coordinates: 43°10′21″N 78°42′14″W
- Built: 1858
- Architectural style: Greek Revival
- MPS: Stone Buildings of Lockport, New York MPS
- NRHP reference No.: 03000481
- Added to NRHP: May 30, 2003

Maloney House is a historic home located at Lockport in Niagara County, New York. It is a two-story stone structure built about 1860 by Patrick Maloney, an early settler of Lockport, in the Greek Revival style. It is one of approximately 75 stone residences remaining in the city of Lockport.

It was listed on the National Register of Historic Places in 2003.
