= Benjamin C. Moore Mill =

- U.S. National Register of Historic Places
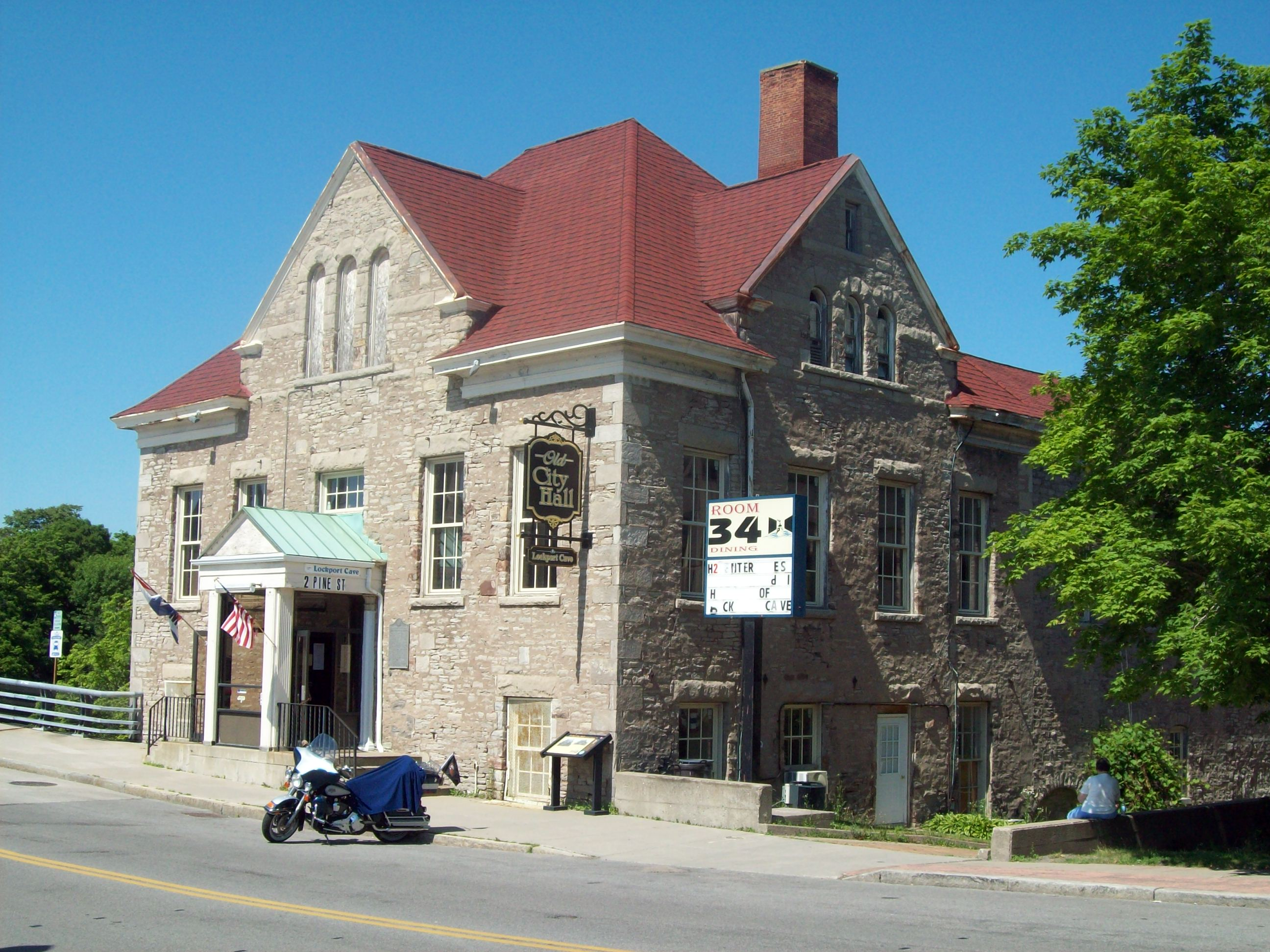
- Benjamin C. Moore Mill, June 2009

- Location within New York Location within the United States
- Location: Pine St. on the Erie Canal, Lockport, New York
- Coordinates: 43°10′14″N 78°41′34″W
- Built: 1864
- NRHP reference No.: 73001226
- Added to NRHP: June 19, 1973

Benjamin C. Moore Mill is a historic flour mill, waterworks, and city hall building located at Lockport in Niagara County, New York. It is a stone structure built in 1859–60, as a flour mill for the Benjamin C. Moore Company. In 1864, Dwight Keep constructed this stone structure that was originally the Benjamin Moore Company Mill. Around 1884, it was converted from a flour mill, to one of the first water pumping plants in America. Within the basement of the Moore building, two of Birdsill Holly's pumps were installed, one pushing 3 million gallons of water and the other pushing 5 million, each utilizing the waterpower from the Mill Race. In 1893, the rear addition was constructed and the building was converted for use as city hall for the City of Lockport and was used as city hall until 1974, when the new city hall opened. It was listed on the National Register of Historic Places in 1973.
