= Dole House (Lockport, New York) =

Historic house in New York, United States

- U.S. National Register of Historic Places
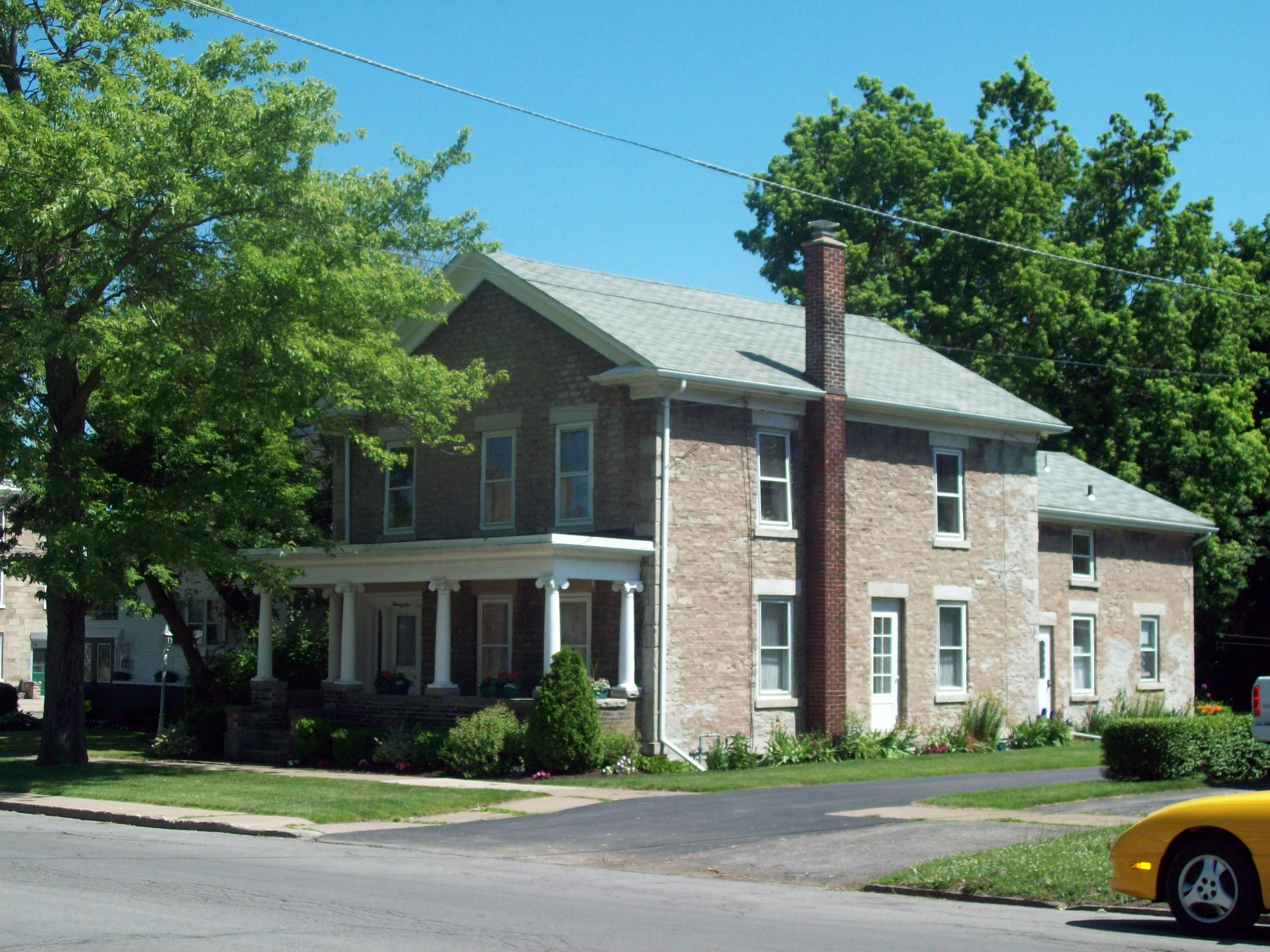
- Dole House, June 2009

- Location within New York Location within the United States
- Interactive map showing the location of Dole House
- Location: 74 Niagara St., Lockport, New York
- Coordinates: 43°10′11″N 78°41′52″W
- Built: 1840
- Architectural style: Federal, Classical Revival
- MPS: Stone Buildings of Lockport, New York MPS
- NRHP reference No.: 03000485
- Added to NRHP: May 30, 2003

Dole House is a historic home located at Lockport in Niagara County, New York. It is a two-story stone structure built in 1840 in the Federal style by Isaac Dole, an early settler of Lockport. It was renovated in the 1890s in the Colonial Revival style. It is one of approximately 75 stone residences remaining in the city of Lockport. It is currently a private residence.

It was listed on the National Register of Historic Places in 2003.
