= Somerset, New York =

- Town
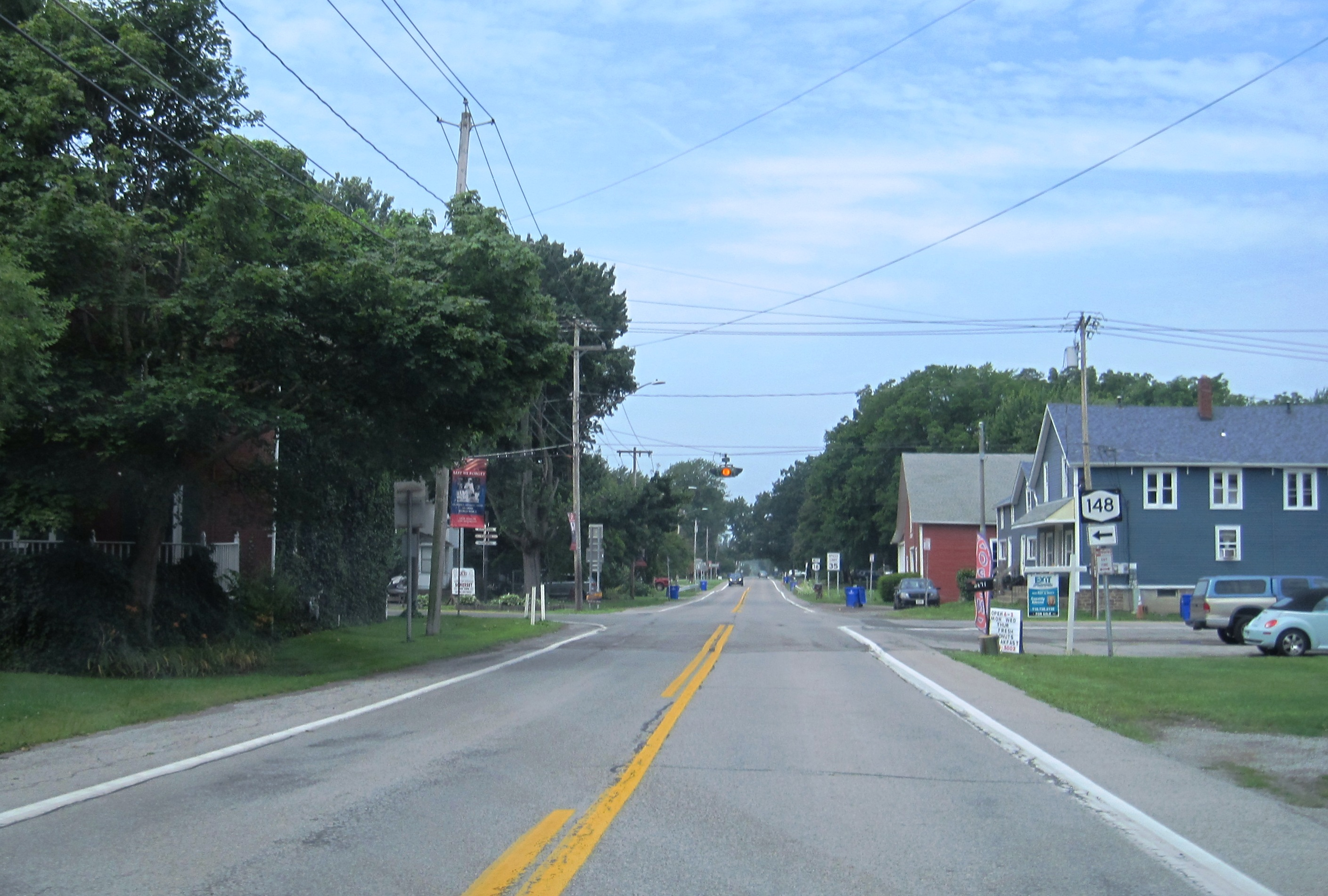
- Hamlet of Somerset within the town

- Location in Niagara County and the state of New York.

- Location within New York Location within the United States
- Coordinates: 43°20′12″N 78°32′46″W
- Country: United States
- State: New York
- County: Niagara
- Named for: Somerset, New Jersey

Government
  - Type: Town Council
  - Town Supervisor: Jeffrey Dewart (R)
  - Town Council: Members' List: • Jeffrey Dewart (R); • Gail Damon (R); • Jon Hotaling (R); • Fred Leuer (R); • Cameron Kiner (R)

Area
  - Total: 37.17 sq mi (96.27 km^{2})
  - Land: 37.11 sq mi (96.11 km^{2})
  - Water: 0.062 sq mi (0.16 km^{2})
- Elevation: 330 ft (100 m)

Population (2010)
  - Total: 2,662
  - Estimate (2016): 2,579
  - Density: 69.5/sq mi (26.83/km^{2})
- Time zone: UTC-5 (Eastern (EST))
  - Summer (DST): UTC-4 (EDT)
- ZIP Code: 14012 (Barker); 14008 (Appleton); 14098 (Lyndonville)
- FIPS code: 36-68330
- GNIS feature ID: 0979504
- Website: www.somersetny.org

Somerset is a town in Niagara County, New York, United States. The population was 2,662 at the 2010 census. The town is believed to be named after Somerset, New Jersey, the source of some early settlers.

The Town of Somerset is in the northeast corner of the county and is northeast of the City of Niagara Falls.

== History ==
The Town of Somerset was established in 1823 from a section of the Town of Hartland. Part of Somerset was used later to form the Town of Newfane.

The Thirty Mile Point Light is listed on the National Register of Historic Places.

== Geography ==
According to the United States Census Bureau, the town has a total area of 37.2 square miles (96 km^{2}), of which 37.2 square miles (96 km^{2}) is land and 0.1 square miles (0.26 km^{2}) (0.19%) is water.

Somerset borders Lake Ontario on the north and Orleans County, New York on the east.

=== Adjacent cities and towns ===
- Town of Hartland - south
- Town of Newfane - west
- Orleans County, Town of Ridgeway - east
- Lake Ontario - north

=== Major highways in the Town of Somerset ===
- New York State Route 18 (Lake Rd.), East-West Highway across the north part of town paralleling Lake Ontario from a distance.
- New York State Route 148 (Quaker Rd.), North-South roadway through the town from the Hartland town line to its northern terminus at Lake Rd. (NY 18) just north of Barker.
- New York State Route 269 (County Line Rd.), North-South roadway that makes up the eastern town line, as well as the Niagara-Orleans County Line. This roadway runs from its northern end at Lake Rd. (NY 18) south to the Hartland town line.

== Demographics ==
Historical population
| Census | Pop. | Note | %± |
|---|---|---|---|
| 1830 | 871 | | — |
| 1840 | 1,742 | | 100.0% |
| 1850 | 2,154 | | 23.7% |
| 1860 | 2,132 | | −1.0% |
| 1870 | 1,862 | | −12.7% |
| 1880 | 2,015 | | 8.2% |
| 1890 | 1,962 | | −2.6% |
| 1900 | 1,923 | | −2.0% |
| 1910 | 2,260 | | 17.5% |
| 1920 | 2,003 | | −11.4% |
| 1930 | 1,892 | | −5.5% |
| 1940 | 2,041 | | 7.9% |
| 1950 | 2,227 | | 9.1% |
| 1960 | 2,489 | | 11.8% |
| 1970 | 2,677 | | 7.6% |
| 1980 | 2,701 | | 0.9% |
| 1990 | 2,655 | | −1.7% |
| 2000 | 2,865 | | 7.9% |
| 2010 | 2,662 | | −7.1% |
| 2016 (est.) | 2,579 | | −3.1% |
U.S. Decennial Census

As of the census of 2000, there were 2,865 people, 1,000 households, and 786 families residing in the town. The population density was 77.1 inhabitants per square mile (29.8/km^{2}). There were 1,132 housing units at an average density of 30.5 per square mile (11.8/km^{2}). The racial makeup of the town was 97.07% White, 0.73% African American, 0.66% Native American, 0.52% Asian, 0.45% from other races, and 0.56% from two or more races. Hispanic or Latino of any race were 1.29% of the population.

There were 1,000 households, out of which 38.3% had children under the age of 18 living with them, 65.1% were married couples living together, 8.1% had a female householder with no husband present, and 21.3% were non-families. 17.3% of all households were made up of individuals, and 8.4% had someone living alone who was 65 years of age or older. The average household size was 2.85 and the average family size was 3.18.

In the town, the population was spread out, with 29.5% under the age of 18, 6.9% from 18 to 24, 27.8% from 25 to 44, 23.9% from 45 to 64, and 11.9% who were 65 years of age or older. The median age was 37 years. For every 100 females, there were 106.0 males. For every 100 females age 18 and over, there were 101.9 males.

The median income for a household in the town was $44,216, and the median income for a family was $49,583. Males had a median income of $39,583 versus $20,508 for females. The per capita income for the town was $17,792. About 8.2% of families and 10.1% of the population were below the poverty line, including 16.4% of those under age 18 and 3.8% of those age 65 or over.

== Communities and locations in Somerset ==
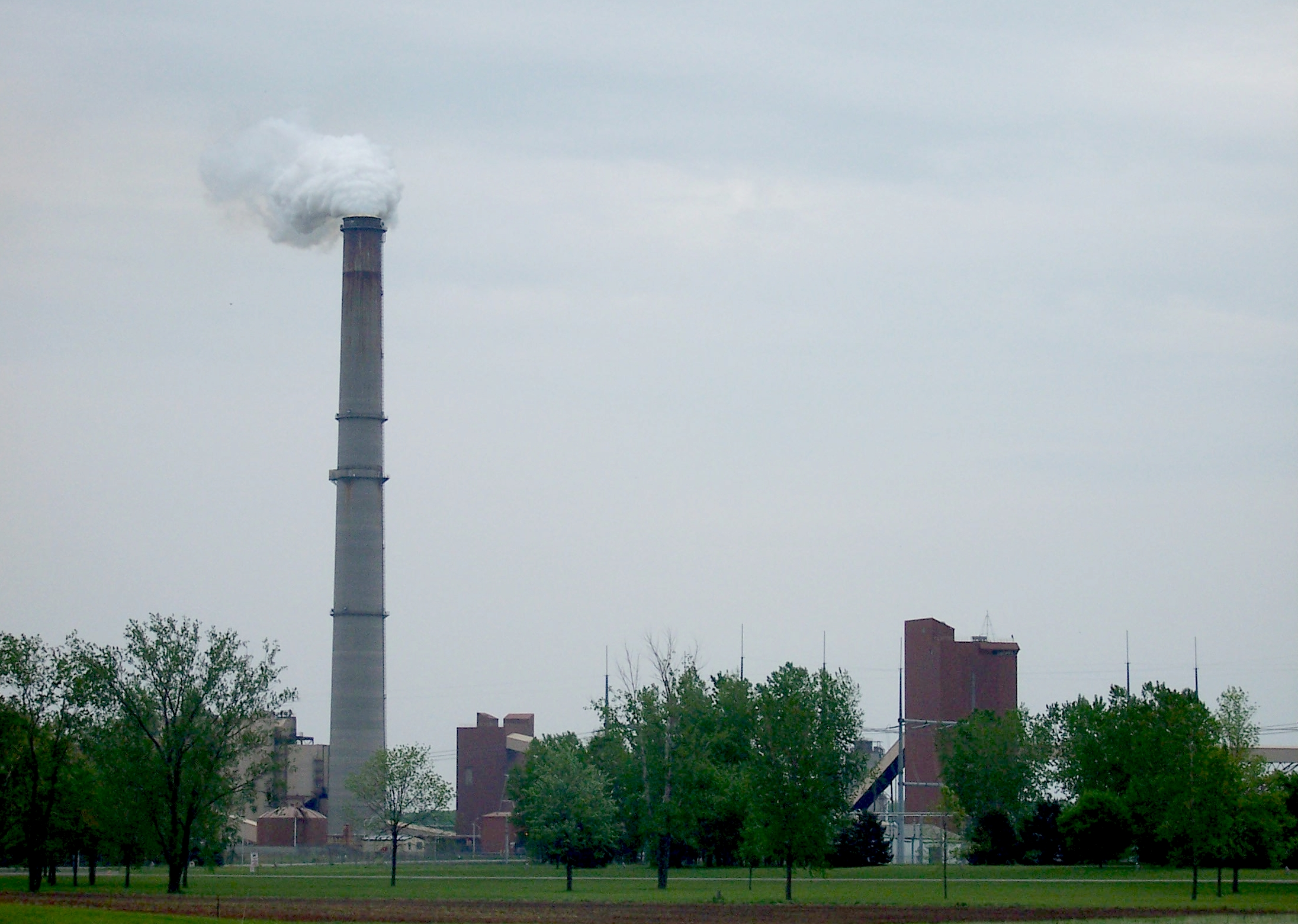
The Kintigh Generating Station

- Barker – The Village of Barker, centrally located in the town.
- County Line – A hamlet on the east town line by Routes NY-18 and NY-269. The community is shared with Orleans County, New York.
- Golden Hill State Park – A state park on the shore of Lake Ontario in the northeast part of the town.
- Kintigh Generating Station – A former power generating station on Lake Ontario northwest of Barker.
- Millers – A hamlet by the eastern town line at NY-269, shared with the town of Yates in Orleans County.
- Somerset – A hamlet north of Barker on Lake Road (NY-18) and Quaker Road (NY-148).
- South Somerset – A hamlet at Somerset Road and Town Line Road.
- West Somerset – A hamlet west of Barker on West Somerset Road at Hosmer Road.

== Adjacent towns and areas ==
The northern border is Lake Ontario with Canada on the opposite shore. The eastern border is the Town of Yates in Orleans County. The south border is the Town of Hartland, and the west border is the Town of Newfane.
