= Lyndonville =

Lyndonville can refer to:

- Lyndonville, New York
- Lyndonville, Vermont
