= Derek Pagel =

American football player (born 1979)

No. 20, 37, 25
- Position: Safety

Personal information
- Born: October 24, 1979 (age 47); Plainfield, Iowa, U.S.
- Listed height: 6 ft 1 in (1.85 m)
- Listed weight: 208 lb (94 kg)

Career information
- High school: Plainfield (Nashua, Iowa)
- College: Iowa
- NFL draft: 2003: 5th round, 140th overall pick

Career history
- New York Jets (2003–2004); Dallas Cowboys (2005)

Awards and highlights
- Second-team All-Big Ten (2002)

Career NFL statistics
- Games played: 19
- Tackles: 15
- Stats at Pro Football Reference

Derek L. Pagel (born October 24, 1979) is an American former professional football player who was a safety in the National Football League (NFL) for the New York Jets and Dallas Cowboys. He played college football for the Iowa Hawkeyes and was selected by the New York Jets in the fifth round of the 2003 NFL draft.

== Early life ==
Pagel attended Nashua-Plainfield High School, where he played football and basketball. He walked-on at the University of Iowa. He played mostly on special teams in his first 2 seasons.

As a junior, he became a starter at free safety playing alongside Bob Sanders and recorded one interception. As a senior, he tied with Jovon Johnson for the team lead with 4 interceptions, including one returned for a touchdown.

== Professional career ==
Pre-draft measurables
Height	Weight	Arm length	Hand span	40-yard dash	10-yard split	20-yard split	20-yard shuttle	Three-cone drill	Vertical jump	Broad jump	Bench press
6 ft 1 in (1.85 m)	208 lb (94 kg)	30 7/8 in (0.78 m)	9 3/8 in (0.24 m)	4.56 s	1.58 s	2.66 s	4.08 s	6.87 s	35 1/2 in (0.90 m)	9 ft 7 in (2.92 m)	25 reps
All values from NFL Combine.

=== New York Jets ===
Pagel was selected by the New York Jets in the fifth round (140th overall) of the 2003 NFL draft. On November 9, 2004, he was placed on the injured reserve list with a left calf injury he suffered in the eighth game against the Buffalo Bills, finishing the season with 5 special teams tackles. He was waived on August 8, 2005.

=== Dallas Cowboys ===
On August 9, 2005, he was claimed off waivers by the Dallas Cowboys. He suffered a torn rotator cuff injury in the first preseason game against the Arizona Cardinals and was placed on the injured reserve list on August 18. He was released on March 2, 2006.

== Personal life ==
Pagel wrote the book "Growing Up Hawkeye".
