= Bradford, Chickasaw County, Iowa =

Bradford, Iowa
- Unincorporated community
- Location within Iowa
- Coordinates: 42°57′58″N 92°30′18″W
- Country: United States
- State: Iowa
- County: Chickasaw
- Elevation: 981 ft (299 m)
- Time zone: UTC-6 (Central (CST))
  - Summer (DST): UTC-5 (CDT)
- Zip Codes: 50041
- Area code: 641
- GNIS feature ID: 465990

Bradford is an unincorporated community in Chickasaw County, Iowa, United States.

Originally founded as a Native American trading post, Bradford grew into the county seat of Chickasaw County, before losing its courthouse, post office, and most of its residents. Bradford remains the site of a history museum and the Little Brown Church, the inspiration for the 1857 song, "The Church in the Wildwood".

== Geography ==
Bradford lies along Highway 346 northeast of Nashua.

== History ==
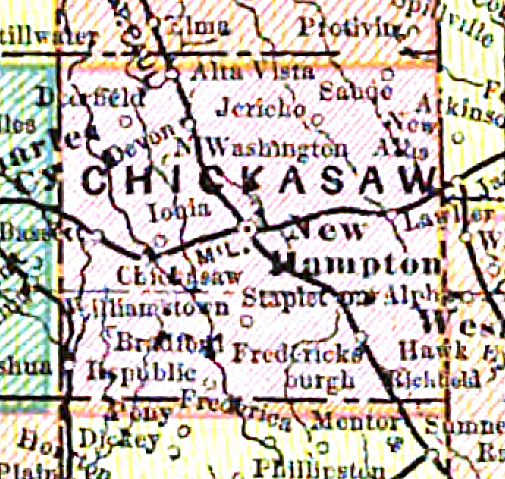
Bradford in Chickasaw County, Iowa, in 1887

A Native American trading post was established by the government in the vicinity of Bradford in 1840; this consisted of three log buildings. The natives here were of the Chickasaw tribe and their chief was named Bradford. The post was abandoned in 1850.

Bradford was platted in sections 9 and 16 of Bradford Township, about a mile and a half northeast of Nashua and along the eastern banks of the Little Cedar River.

The first school in Chickasaw County was in the village of Bradford. This log building was built in 1852. Bradford was later home to the Bradford Academy. The academy, a private high school intended to prepare students for university, was founded by Reverend J.K. Nutting in 1865. Later, the Bradford Academy was housed in a fine brick building. The academy was open for 12 years, and had as many as 125 students at its peak.

In 1852, a post office opened in Bradford.

Bradford served as the first seat of Chickasaw County, until 1857 when the seat was transferred to New Hampton.

In 1857 Dr. William S. Pitts stopped in Bradford while en route to Fredericksburg, Iowa and was inspired to write the song, "The Church in the Wildwood", about The Little Brown Church. This church still holds services.

Bradford's population was estimated at 100 in 1887.

After the removal of the Chickasaw County seat to New Hampton, Bradford's importance was diminished. Bradford was bypassed by the railroad in favor of Nashua. These events led to a decline in the community, and some residents moved to Nashua or New Hampton. The Bradford post office closed on May 31, 1899.

Bradford is still home to the Little Brown Church and the Bradford Pioneer Village museum.

== Notable person ==
- Levi M. Hubbell, businessman and politician
