= New York State Route 148 =

State highway in Niagara County, New York, US

New York State Route 148
- Quaker Road
- Map of western New York with NY 148 highlighted in red

Route information
- Maintained by Niagara County
- Length: 7.53 mi (12.12 km)
- Existed: 1960–present

Major junctions
- South end: NY 104 in Hartland
- North end: NY 18 in Somerset

Location
- Country: United States
- State: New York
- Counties: Niagara

Highway system
- New York Highways; Interstate; US; State; Reference; Parkways
← NY 147	→ NY 149

New York State Route 148 (NY 148) is a state highway in Niagara County, New York, in the United States. It runs in a north–south direction for 7.53 miles (12.12 km) between an intersection with NY 104 in the town of Hartland and a junction with NY 18 north of the village of Barker in the town of Somerset. The entire length of NY 148 is named Quaker Road and maintained by Niagara County as part of County Route 15 (CR 15). The concurrent county route number is unsigned, as are all county routes in Niagara County. NY 148 was assigned in 1960, supplementing the preexisting CR 15.

== Route description ==
NY 148 begins at an intersection with NY 104 (Ridge Road) and Quaker Road in the town of Hartland, just east of the Hartland Central Cemetery. The highway proceeds north through Hartland as a two-lane rural road, maintained by Niagara County as part of the unsigned CR 15. NY 148 proceeds north, running along a short residential strip before the intersection with Chapman Road. After Chapman Road, NY 148 continues to pass homes until its junction with Seaman Road, where it enters more rural surroundings. The route crosses a canal as it proceeds northward through Hartland, bending northeast into the town of Somerset at Town Line Road.

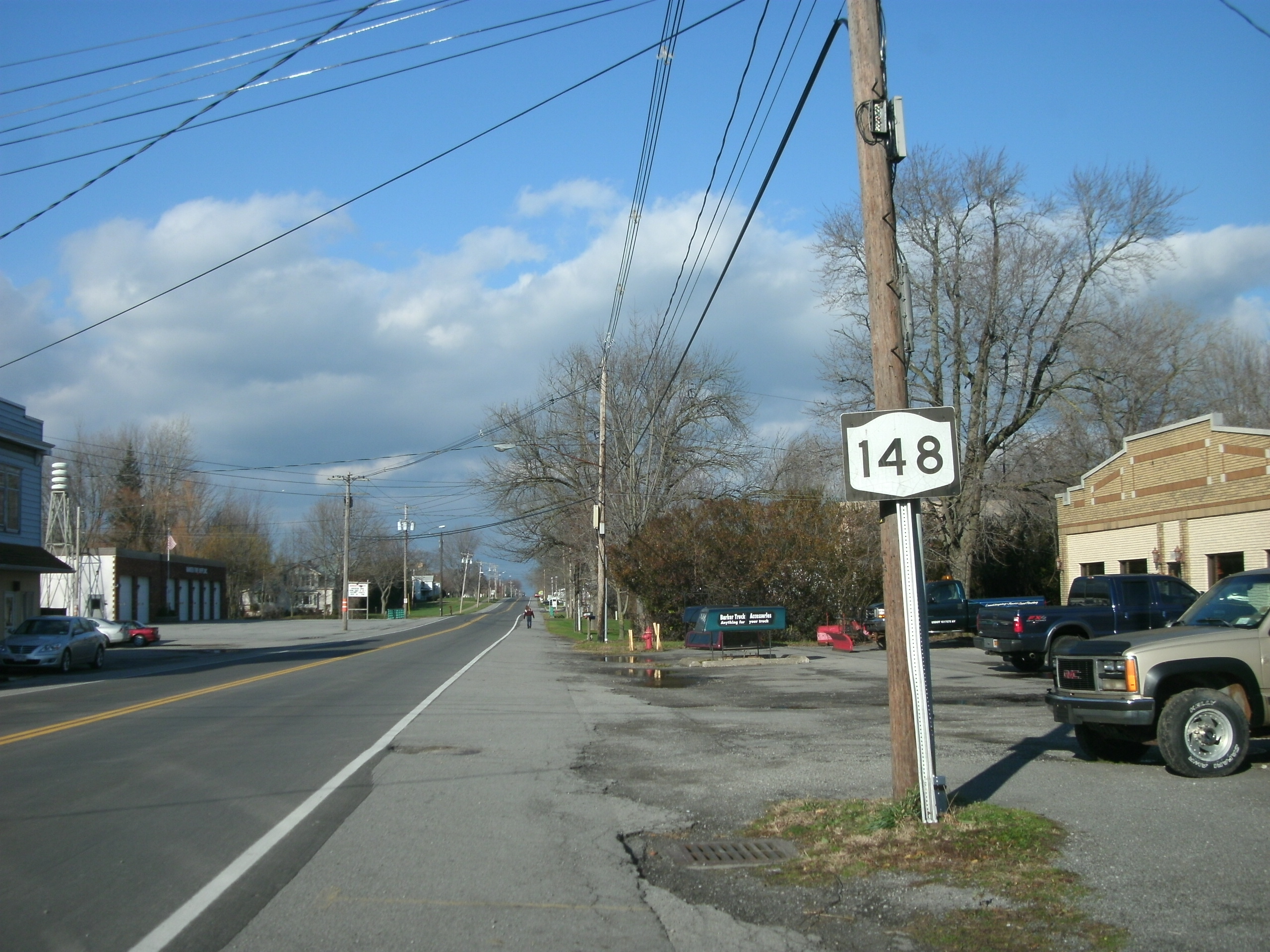
NY 148 northbound through the village of Barker

In Somerset, NY 148 remains a two-lane roadway, passing through sparsely developed areas on its way to the village of Barker. In the southern part of the community, the route meets Coleman and West Somerset roads (CR 2 and CR 3, respectively). Through Barker, NY 148 is a two-lane residential street, passing west of Barker Free Library and east of Barker High School. After Haight Road, NY 148 leaves the village, continuing north through a lightly populated area. At Arlington Road, the number of homes along NY 148 rises once again as the route enters the hamlet of Somerset, located at the junction of NY 148 and NY 18 (Lake Road). This junction serves as the northern terminus of NY 148, while CR 15 continues north through Somerset towards Lake Ontario.

== History ==
Quaker Road was established as a north–south highway between Hartland and Somerset sometime prior to 1897. By 1915, the segment of Quaker Road between Ridge Road and Lake Road in the hamlet of Somerset was taken over by Niagara County and designated as CR 15. On March 10, 1915, the county awarded a contract worth $65,258 (equivalent to $2.08 million in 2025) to rebuild the highway. Construction on the road began sometime around May 1, and it was reopened to traffic around November 1. The project finished slightly over-budget with a final cost of $65,554 (equivalent to $2.09 million in 2025). A celebration commemorating the completion of the rebuilt road was organized by the Barker Chamber of Commerce and held on December 6, 1915. The portion of Quaker Road between Ridge and Lake roads (then U.S. Route 104 and NY 18, respectively) was designated as NY 148 by the state of New York in 1960; however, ownership and maintenance of the route remained in the hands of Niagara County.

== Major intersections ==
The entire route is in Niagara County.

Location	mi	km	Destinations	Notes
Hartland	0.00	0.00	NY 104 (Ridge Road) – Rochester, Niagara Falls	Southern terminus
Somerset	7.53	12.12	NY 18 (Lake Road)	Northern terminus; hamlet of Somerset
1.000 mi = 1.609 km; 1.000 km = 0.621 mi
