= Barker, New York =

Barker, New York can refer to:

- Barker, Broome County, New York, town
- Barker, Niagara County, New York, village
