= Golden Hill State Park =

State park in Niagara County, New York

- Location within New York
- Type: State park
- Location: 9691 Lower Lake Road; Barker, New York
- Coordinates: 43°22′08″N 78°28′44″W
- Area: 510 acres (2.1 km^{2})
- Created: 1962
- Operator: New York State Office of Parks, Recreation and Historic Preservation
- Visitors: 70,734 (in 2014)
- Open: All year
- Website: Golden Hill State Park

Golden Hill State Park is a 510-acre (2.1 km^{2}) state park located in Niagara County, New York, United States. The park is on the south shore of Lake Ontario in the northeast corner of the Town of Somerset, north of Lower Lake Road. Thirty Mile Point Light is included within the park.

Golden Hill State Park was established in 1962 on the former estate of Robert Newell, a local industrialist; remnants of Newell's estate were largely left abandoned after the state purchased it and were not rediscovered until 2017.

The park offers picnic tables with pavilions, a playground and playing fields, recreation programs, a nature trail, hiking and biking, fishing and ice fishing, a boat launch, seasonal small game and waterfowl hunting, a campground with tent and trailer sites, ice skating, cross-country skiing, snowmobiling and disc golf.

In 2005, Golden Hill was named one of Reserve America's Top Outdoor locations.

== See also ==
- List of New York state parks
