= Jackson Blood Cobblestone House =

Historic house in New York, United States

- U.S. National Register of Historic Places
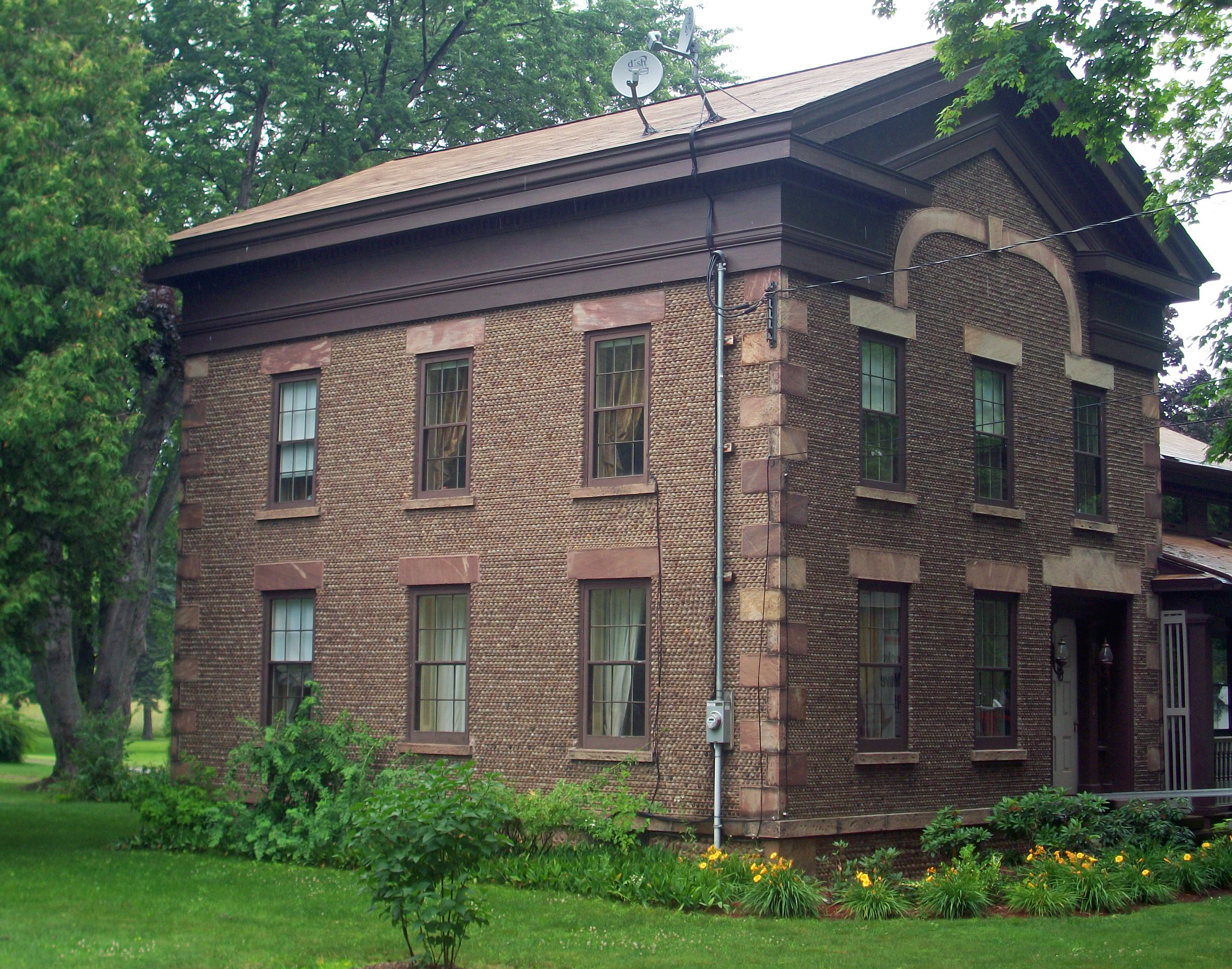
- South profile and east elevation of main block, 2010

- Location within New York Location within the United States
- Location: Lyndonville, NY
- Nearest city: Lockport
- Coordinates: 43°19′0″N 78°23′20″W
- Area: 0.8 acres (3,200 m^{2})
- Built: 1846
- Architectural style: Greek Revival
- MPS: Cobblestone Architecture of New York State MPS
- NRHP reference No.: 05000635
- Added to NRHP: June 30, 2005

The Jackson Blood Cobblestone House is located on South Main Street (state highway NY 63) in Lyndonville, New York, United States. It is a Greek Revival house built in the middle of the 19th century.

Blood, a prominent citizen of the surrounding Town of Yates in its early years, built the house with cobblestones he and his family personally transported down to the site from Lake Ontario to the north. Its former chimney arrangement suggests that it was one of the first houses in the area to be heated with stoves instead of fireplaces.

During the first half of the 20th century it was subdivided into three rental units, and much of the interior renovated. Later it was restored to a single-family dwelling. In 2005 it was listed on the National Register of Historic Places. It is the only property in Lyndonville so far listed, and the northernmost entry on the Register in Orleans County.

== Building ==
The house is located on a three-quarter–acre (3,200 m^{2}) lot on the west side of the street south of the village's center, where Route 63 crosses Johnson Creek. The neighborhood is residential, with the houses dating to the late 19th and 20th centuries. Mature trees dominate the lots, giving way to worked fields on either side of the highway. The terrain is level. A modern, non-contributing garage is located at the rear of the lot.

Three sections comprise the house. The main block is a large rectangular three-by-three-bay two and a half stories tall. Two one-and-a-half-story wings extend to the north and west (rear). All are sided in rows of lake-washed medium-sized cobblestones set beads of V-profile lime masonry.

All trim — lintels, sills, quoins and water table — is limestone. That material is also used for an unusual decorative feature on the east (front) facade: a semi-elliptical stone arch with keystone that springs from the lintels of the second story windows. Above it the shallow pitched gabled roof is set off by a very deep plain frieze and molded cornice with returns. The six-over-six double-hung sash windows are original. A mid-20th century porch with square posts is on the east face of the north wing.

The recessed main entrance, on the northern bay of the main block, contains a large paneled door with sidelights. It opens into a vestibule where a stair with a simple Colonial Revival railing climbs to the second story. A single large room is to the south; the north wing contains a dining room with marble fireplace, and the kitchen. The rear wing is a family room. Upstairs, the layout is similar, with a large bedroom above the large first-floor main room.

Most of the house's finishings were added later. The ceilings of the main rooms are modern coved plaster. The most significant original elements are the wooden doors and their shouldered surrounds. On the second floors of the wing the small sash windows slide up into the wall.

== History ==
Jackson Blood came to the area before Orleans County had even been formed, in 1815, as a young man. He bought a farm near the lake and later acquired large tracts of land around today's Lyndonville. When the town, named after Governor Joseph C. Yates, was formed in 1823, he was named one of its first three commissioners of common schools.

Local tradition holds that the Blood family themselves collected the cobblestones from the lake and brought them down to the house starting with Blood's purchase of a farm in the area in 1830, reflecting Lyndonville's increasing importance within the town over Yates Center due to its proximity to the Erie Canal and its location along a creek that powered a mill. It was completed in 1846, its tight rows a hallmark of the middle and late years of the cobblestone trend. Originally it had four chimneys, three of which were purely decorative, to maintain a symmetrical exterior appearance. The fourth was at the southeast corner of the main block. Its extant flue angles to the east wall, suggesting along with the construction date that the builder was using the new technology of stoves to heat the house, instead of relying on fireplaces.

Blood lived in the house until 1875. A few years before his death, one of his sons, C. Jackson Blood, served as town supervisor for a term. In the 20th century, the house was subdivided into three rental units. The dining room fireplace was added during this period, as was much of the interior decor. In the 1950s, another renovation reunified the house. There have been no other significant changes.

== See also ==
- National Register of Historic Places listings in Orleans County, New York
