= Hartland, New York =

- Town
- Location in Niagara County and the state of New York.
- Coordinates: 43°14′58″N 78°32′14″W
- Country: United States
- State: New York
- County: Niagara
- Named after: Hartland, Vermont

Government
  - Type: Town Council
  - Town Supervisor: Margaret M. Zaepfel (R)
  - Town Council: Members' List: • Daniel S. Hill (R); • Joseph A. Reed (R); • David Huntington. (R); • Cliff Grant (R)

Area
  - Total: 52.41 sq mi (135.75 km^{2})
  - Land: 52.38 sq mi (135.66 km^{2})
  - Water: 0.039 sq mi (0.10 km^{2})
- Elevation: 360 ft (110 m)

Population (2010)
  - Total: 4,117
  - Estimate (2016): 4,007
  - Density: 76.5/sq mi (29.54/km^{2})
- Time zone: UTC-5 (Eastern (EST))
  - Summer (DST): UTC-4 (EDT)
- ZIP Codes: 14008 (Appleton); 14012 (Barker); 14067 (Gasport); 14094 (Lockport); 14105 (Middleport)
- FIPS code: 36-32490
- GNIS feature ID: 0979054
- Website: townofhartland.org

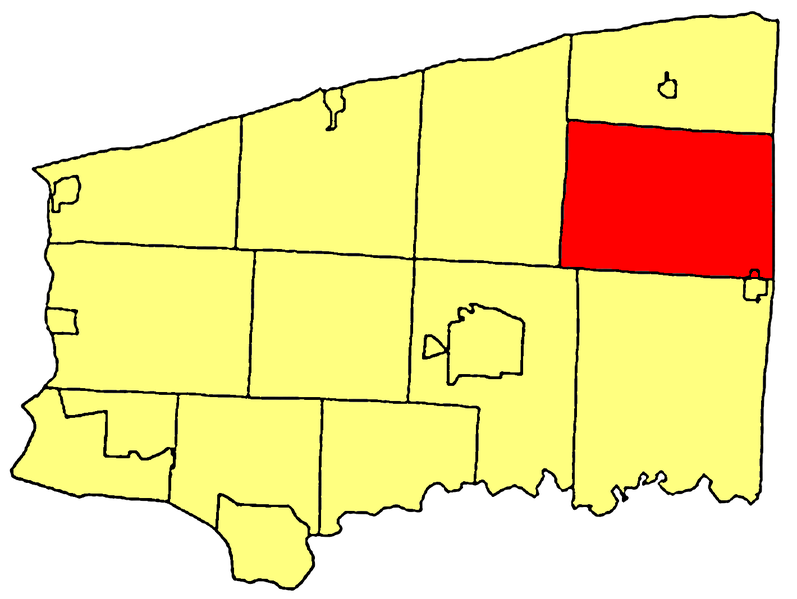
Location within Niagara County.

Hartland is a town in Niagara County, New York, United States. The population was 4,117 at the 2010 census. The town is named after Hartland, Vermont, the homeplace of some early settlers.

The Town of Hartland is on the eastern border of the county.

== History ==
The town was founded when Zebulon Barnum, Isaac Southwell, and John Morrison settled in the area in 1803. The Town of Hartland was created in 1812 from an eastern section of the Town of Cambria. Subsequently, the other towns were formed from its territory by cutting out, in whole or part, the towns of Somerset, Royalton, and Newfane by 1824.

Upon the completion of the Erie Canal in 1824, the town lost its commercial prominence to Lockport, which was centered on the canal.

The following are listed on the National Register of Historic Places: Constant Riley W. Bixby House, Amzi Bradley Farmstead, District#10 Schoolhouse, Harrington Cobblestone Farmhouse and Barn Complex, and Philo Newton Cobblestone House.

== Geography ==
According to the United States Census Bureau, the town has a total area of 52.4 square miles (136 km^{2}), of which, 52.3 square miles (135 km^{2}) of it is land and 0.04 square miles (0.10 km^{2}) of it (0.08%) is water.

The east town line is the border of Orleans County, New York, partly marked by New York State Route 269. Ridge Road, New York State Route 104 is a major route across the town.

== Notable people ==
- Henry H. Bickford, American Civil War veteran and Medal of Honor recipient
- Ann Weaver Bradley, educator, temperance worker, and writer
- S. Wallace Dempsey, former US Congressman
- Newton Edmunds, second Governor of Dakota Territory

== Adjacent towns and areas ==
Hartland is south of the Town of Somerset and north of the Town of Royalton and a small part of the Town of Lockport. To the west is the Town of Newfane. The eastern border is the Town of Ridgeway in Orleans County.

- Orleans County, Town of Ridgeway - east
- Town of Royalton - south
- Town of Lockport - southwest
- Town of Newfane - west
- Town of Somerset - north

== Major highways in the Town of Hartland ==
- New York State Route 104 (Ridge Rd.), East-West highway across the town from the Newfane town line to the Niagara-Orleans County line on into the Town of Ridgeway.
- New York State Route 148 (Quaker Rd.) North-South roadway through the central part of town from its south end at Ridge Rd. (NY 104) north to the Town of Somerset.
- New York State Route 269 (County Line Rd.), North-South roadway that makes up the eastern town line, as well as the Niagara-Orleans County Line. This route runs from its southern end at Ridge Rd. (NY 104) north into the Town of Somerset.
- New York State Route 271 (Stone Rd., Main St.(Middleport)), North-South Highway in the southeastern part of town its northern end at Ridge Rd. (NY 104) south into Middleport where it has its southern terminus at Telegraph Rd. (NY 31).

== Demographics ==
Historical population
Census	Pop.	Note	%±
1820	1,448		—
1830	1,584		9.4%
1840	2,350		48.4%
1850	3,028		28.9%
1860	3,256		7.5%
1870	3,226		−0.9%
1880	3,340		3.5%
1890	2,843		−14.9%
1900	2,728		−4.0%
1910	2,638		−3.3%
1920	1,987		−24.7%
1930	2,500		25.8%
1940	2,527		1.1%
1950	2,849		12.7%
1960	3,577		25.6%
1970	4,223		18.1%
1980	4,105		−2.8%
1990	3,911		−4.7%
2000	4,165		6.5%
2010	4,117		−1.2%
2016 (est.)	4,007		−2.7%
U.S. Decennial Census

As of the census of 2000, there were 4,165 people, 1,526 households, and 1,167 families residing in the town. The population density was 79.6 inhabitants per square mile (30.7/km^{2}). There were 1,583 housing units at an average density of 30.2 per square mile (11.7/km^{2}). The racial makeup of the town was 97.79% White, 0.53% African American, 0.31% Native American, 0.14% Asian, 0.05% Pacific Islander, 0.22% from other races, and 0.96% from two or more races. Hispanic or Latino of any race were 0.72% of the population.

There were 1,526 households, out of which 35.5% had children under the age of 18 living with them, 63.8% were married couples living together, 8.3% had a female householder with no husband present, and 23.5% were non-families. 19.0% of all households were made up of individuals, and 8.1% had someone living alone who was 65 years of age or older. The average household size was 2.73 and the average family size was 3.10.

In the town, the population was spread out, with 26.6% under the age of 18, 6.9% from 18 to 24, 29.3% from 25 to 44, 26.1% from 45 to 64, and 11.1% who were 65 years of age or older. The median age was 38 years. For every 100 females, there were 101.3 males. For every 100 females age 18 and over, there were 99.0 males.

The median income for a household in the town was $40,281, and the median income for a family was $43,218. Males had a median income of $32,813 versus $21,356 for females. The per capita income for the town was $17,253. About 6.8% of families and 9.3% of the population were below the poverty line, including 10.4% of those under age 18 and 12.5% of those age 65 or over.

== Communities and locations in the Town of Hartland ==
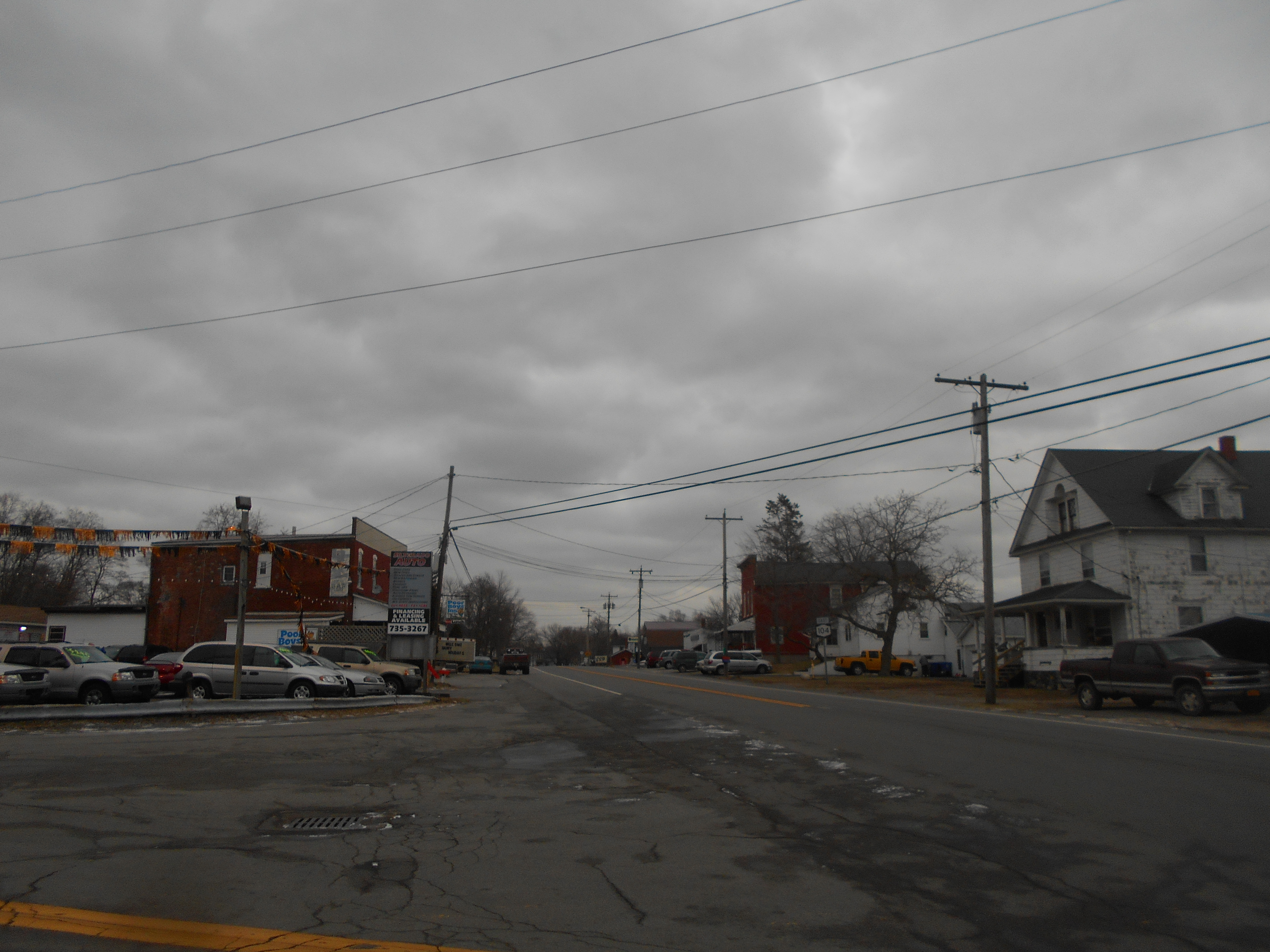
The hamlet of Johnson Creek along Route 104

- Eighteen Mile Creek (East Branch) – A stream that flows westward through the south part of the town.
- Hartland – The hamlet of Hartland is in the south part of the town on Ridge Road (Route 104). Hartland in on the north side of the East Branch Eighteen Mile Creek.
- Hartland Swamp Wildlife Management Area – A conservation area in the northern part of Harland.
- Jeddo – A hamlet near the eastern town line on Ridge Road (Route 104).
- Johnson Creek – A hamlet east of Hartland on Ridge Road (Route 104).
- Middleport – A small part of the Village of Middleport is in the southeast corner of the town.
- North Hartland – A hamlet in the northwest corner of the town on Hosmer Road.
- North Ridgeway – A location near the eastern town line on Route 269.
