= Millers, New York =

Hamlet in New York, United States

Coordinates: 43°19′34″N 78°27′58″W

Millers is a hamlet split between the town of Somerset in Niagara County and the town of Yates in Orleans County, New York, United States.
