= Harrington Cobblestone Farmhouse and Barn Complex =

Historic house in New York, United States

- U.S. National Register of Historic Places
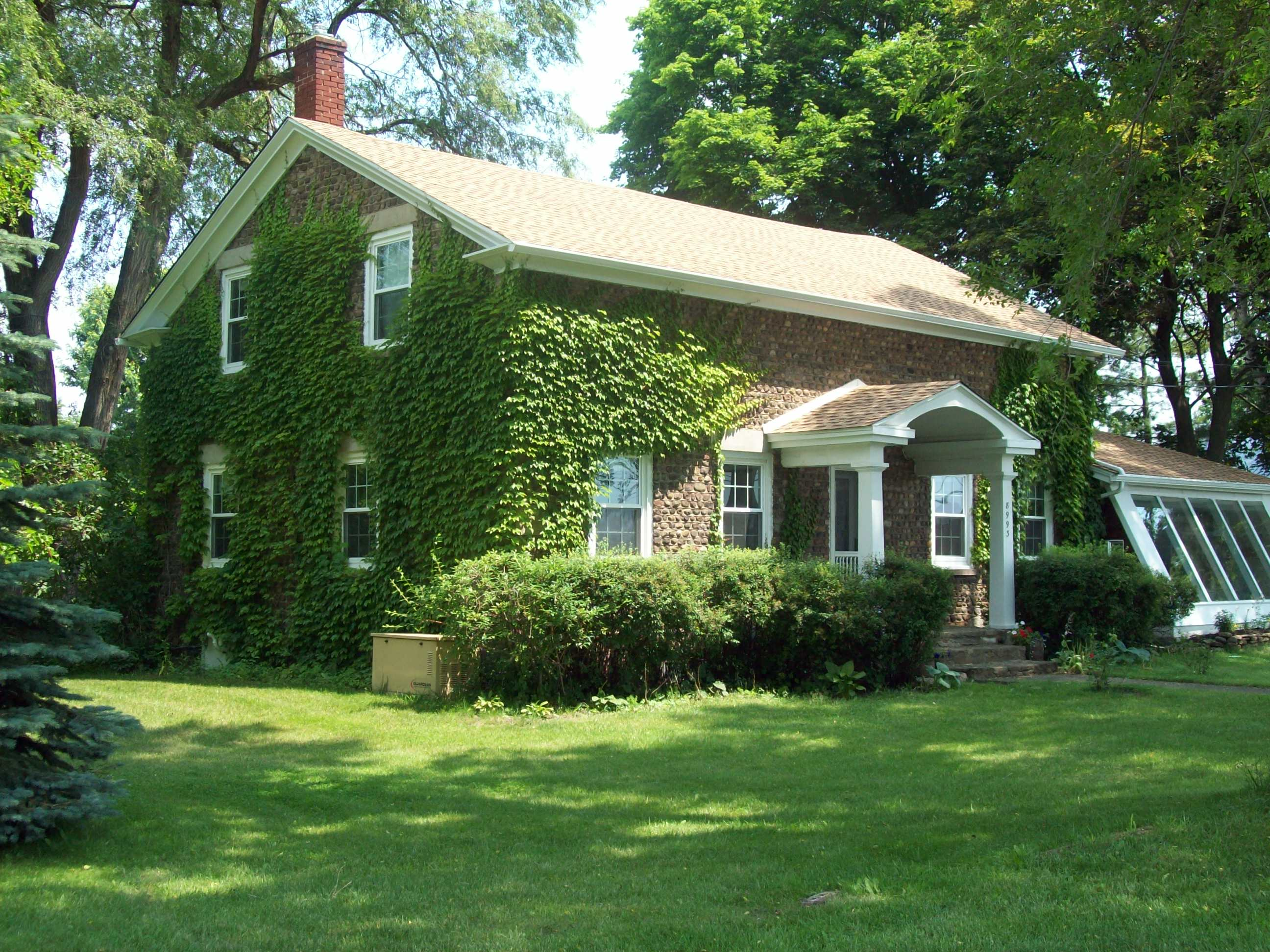
- Harrington Cobblestone Farmhouse, June 2009

- Location within New York Location within the United States
- Location: 8993 Ridge Rd., Hartland, New York
- Coordinates: 43°14′53″N 78°31′33″W
- Built: 1843
- Architectural style: Greek Revival
- MPS: Cobblestone Architecture of New York State MPS
- NRHP reference No.: 05001396
- Added to NRHP: December 07, 2005

Harrington Cobblestone Farmhouse and Barn Complex is a historic home and farm complex located at Hartland in Niagara County, New York. It is a 1 1/2-story cobblestone structure built in 1843 by Vermont native Harry Harrington, in the Greek Revival style. It features irregularly shaped, variously colored cobbles in its construction. It is one of approximately 47 cobblestone structures in Niagara County. Also on the property are a full array of historic farm outbuildings.

It was listed on the National Register of Historic Places in 2005.
