= Constant Riley W. Bixby House =

Historic house in New York, United States

- U.S. National Register of Historic Places
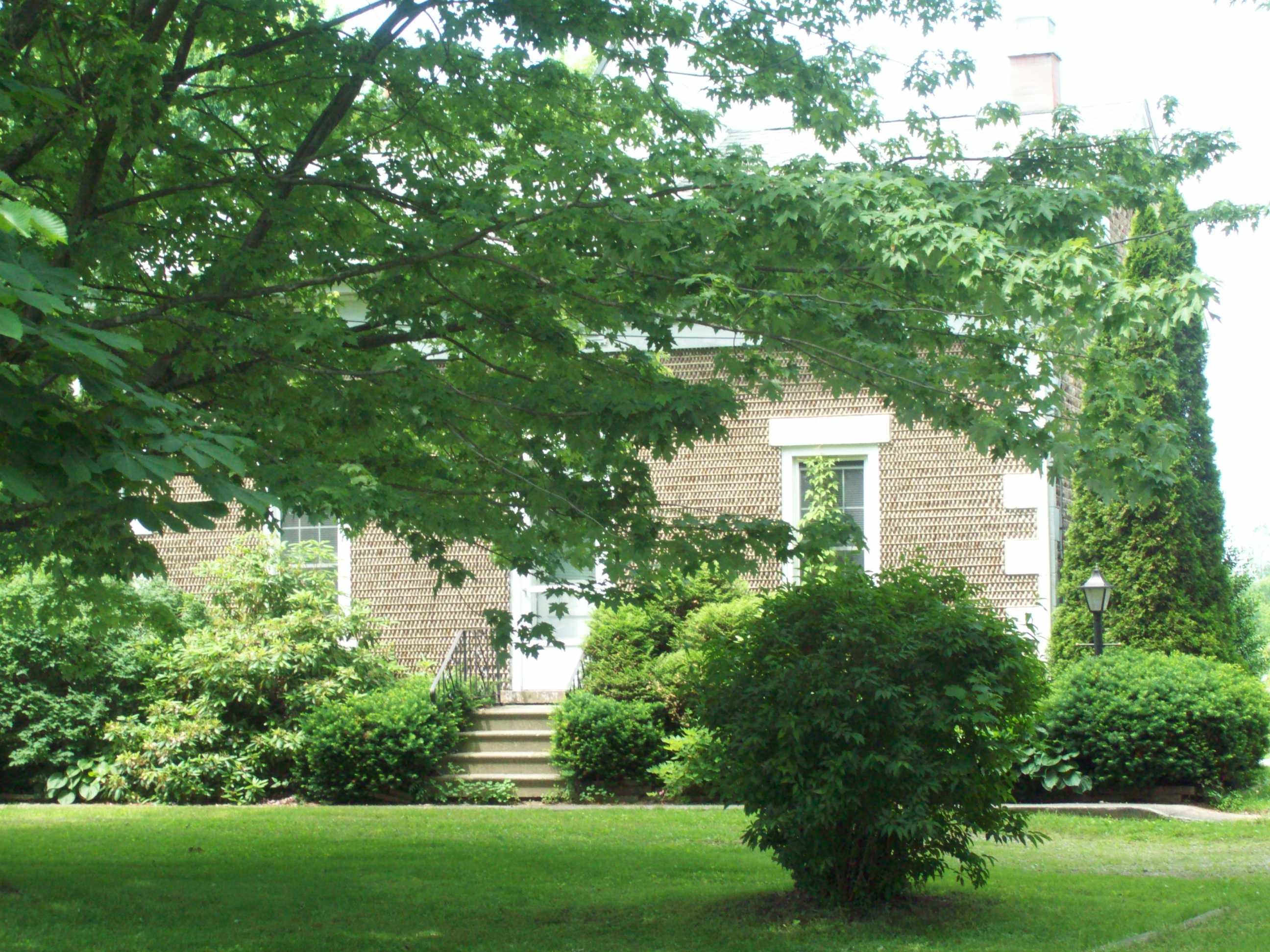
- Bixby House, June 2009

- Location within New York Location within the United States
- Location: 2888 Carmen Rd., Hartland, New York
- Coordinates: 43.26072°N 78.48935°W
- Built: 1845
- Architectural style: Greek Revival
- MPS: Cobblestone Architecture of New York State MPS
- NRHP reference No.: 02001333
- Added to NRHP: November 15, 2002

The Constant Riley W. Bixby House is a historic house located at 2888 Carmen Road in Hartland, Niagara County, New York.

== Description and history ==
It is a two-story, cobblestone structure built in 1845 by Vermont native Constant Riley W. Bixby, in the Greek Revival/Exotic Revival style. It features smooth, regularly shaped, evenly colored lake-washed cobblestones in its construction. It is one of approximately 47 cobblestone structures in Niagara County. In total, there are three contributing structures and one non-contributing structure on the property.

It was listed on the National Register of Historic Places on November 15, 2002.
