= Yates, New York =

- Town
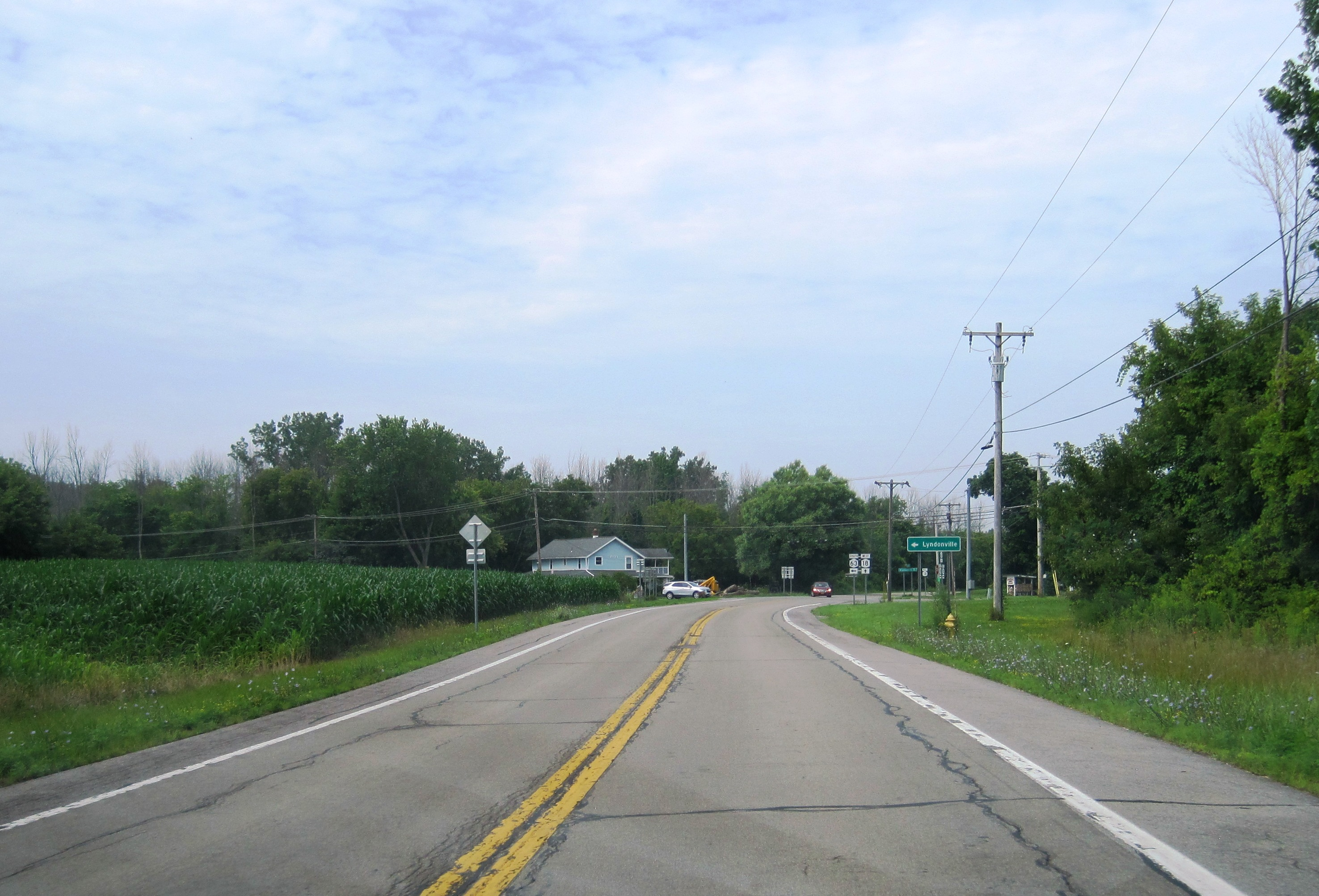
- NY 18 westbound in the town of Yates

- Location in Orleans County and the state of New York.

- Location of New York in the United States
- Coordinates: 43°20′57″N 78°23′51″W
- Country: United States
- State: New York
- County: Orleans

Area
  - Total: 37.39 sq mi (96.83 km^{2})
  - Land: 37.39 sq mi (96.83 km^{2})
  - Water: 0 sq mi (0.00 km^{2})
- Elevation: 331 ft (101 m)

Population (2010)
  - Total: 2,559
  - Estimate (2016): 2,461
  - Density: 65.8/sq mi (25.42/km^{2})
- Time zone: UTC-5 (Eastern (EST))
  - Summer (DST): UTC-4 (EDT)
- FIPS code: 36-83448
- GNIS feature ID: 0979659
- Website: townofyates.org

Yates is a town in Orleans County, New York, United States. The population was 2,510 at the 2000 census. The town in named after Joseph C. Yates, a governor of New York.

The Town of Yates is located in the northwestern part of the county. (There is also a Yates County, New York).

== History ==
The first settler, George Houseman, arrived circa 1809. Yates was incorporated in 1822 from part of the Town of Ridgeway and was briefly called "Northton."

In 1903, the Village of Lyndonville set itself apart from Yates by incorporating as a village.

== Notable people ==
- George D. Lamont, former New York State Senator
- Edmund L. Pitts, New York State Assemblyman, was born in the town in 1839.
- William S. Pitts, Christian composer who wrote The Church in the Wildwood, was born in the town in 1830.

== Geography ==
According to the United States Census Bureau, the town has a total area of 37.5 square miles (97 km^{2}), all land.

The northern part of the Town of Yates borders Lake Ontario. The west town line is shared by the Town of Somerset in Niagara County.

East–west highway New York State Route 18 (Roosevelt Highway) and north–south highway New York State Route 63 (Lyndonville Road) cross in the north part of the town north of Yates Center. North–south highway New York State Route 269 (County Line Road) partly defines the west town line.

== Demographics ==
Historical population
Census	Pop.	Note	%±
1830	1,538		—
1840	2,230		45.0%
1850	2,242		0.5%
1860	2,105		−6.1%
1870	2,014		−4.3%
1880	2,020		0.3%
1890	1,969		−2.5%
1900	1,884		−4.3%
1910	2,156		14.4%
1920	1,940		−10.0%
1930	1,914		−1.3%
1940	1,975		3.2%
1950	2,086		5.6%
1960	2,063		−1.1%
1970	2,303		11.6%
1980	2,447		6.3%
1990	2,497		2.0%
2000	2,510		0.5%
2010	2,559		2.0%
2016 (est.)	2,461		−3.8%
U.S. Decennial Census

As of the census of 2000, there were 2,510 people, 917 households, and 669 families residing in the town. The population density was 67.0 inhabitants per square mile (25.9/km^{2}). There were 1,268 housing units at an average density of 33.8 per square mile (13.1/km^{2}). The racial makeup of the town was 97.13% White, 0.80% African American, 0.28% Native American, 0.28% Asian, 0.28% from other races, and 1.24% from two or more races. Hispanic or Latino of any race were 1.04% of the population.

There were 917 households, out of which 36.4% had children under the age of 18 living with them, 58.3% were married couples living together, 8.5% had a female householder with no husband present, and 27.0% were non-families. 22.2% of all households were made up of individuals, and 11.1% had someone living alone who was 65 years of age or older. The average household size was 2.74 and the average family size was 3.19.

In the town, the population was spread out, with 29.0% under the age of 18, 7.7% from 18 to 24, 27.1% from 25 to 44, 23.2% from 45 to 64, and 12.9% who were 65 years of age or older. The median age was 38 years. For every 100 females, there were 99.4 males. For every 100 females age 18 and over, there were 95.7 males.

The median income for a household in the town was $39,803, and the median income for a family was $42,165. Males had a median income of $32,586 versus $20,224 for females. The per capita income for the town was $15,839. About 5.7% of families and 8.3% of the population were below the poverty line, including 12.2% of those under age 18 and 4.1% of those age 65 or over.

== Communities and locations in Yates ==
- The Alps – a drumlin field east of Lyndonville.
- Ashwood – A location on the east town line.
- County Line – A hamlet on the west town line on Routes NY-269 and NY-18.
- Lyndonville - The Village of Lyndonville is in the center of the town on NY-63.
- Millers – A hamlet on the west town line on NY-269, west of Lyndonville. Partially located in the town of Somerset, Niagara County
- Platten – A location on the east town line.
- Shadigee – A Lake Ontario shore hamlet, where NY-63 ends.
- Yates Center – A hamlet, formerly "Northton," located on NY-63 north of Lyndonville.
