= Nashua-Plainfield Community School District =

Public school district in Nashua, Iowa, United States

Coordinates: 42.949272°N 92.540394°W

Nashua-Plainfield School District

Location
- Nashua, Iowa Bremer, Butler, Chickasaw, and Floyd counties United States
- Coordinates: 42.949272, -92.540394

District information
- Type: Local school district
- Grades: K-12
- Established: 1997
- Superintendent: Keith Turner
- Schools: 2
- Budget: $8,883,000 (2020-21)
- NCES District ID: 1920190

Students and staff
- Students: 582 (2022-23)
- Teachers: 46.25 FTE
- Staff: 42.28 FTE
- Student–teacher ratio: 12.58
- Athletic conference: Top of Iowa
- District mascot: Huskies
- Colors: Red and Black

Other information
- Website: www.nashua-plainfield.k12.ia.us

Nashua-Plainfield Community School District (N-P) is a rural, public school district headquartered in Nashua, Iowa. The district, serving Nashua and Plainfield, occupies sections of four counties: Bremer, Butler, Chickasaw, and Floyd.

It was established on July 1, 1997, by the merger of the Nashua and Plainfield school districts.

== Facility ==
It has a 26,000-square-foot (2,400 m^{2}) athletic facility known as the Husky Wellness Center, which opened in 2013.

Circa 2019, there were plans to build a playground with $25,000 raised by students. The district issued a call for volunteers to build it.

== Enrollment ==
In the 2012–2013 school year, the district had 658 students. All except 15 (2.3%) students were non-Hispanic origins. There were two Hispanic students, making up .3% of the total student body. 126 students were eligible for free lunches and 90 students were eligible for reduced priced lunches, both indicators of poverty; combined these students made up 32.8% of the student body. No students were English language learners. By 2002, enrollment had dropped to 600.

== Schools ==
The district operates two schools, both in Nashua:

- Nashua-Plainfield Elementary School
- Nashua-Plainfield Junior-Senior High School

== See also ==
- List of school districts in Iowa
- List of high schools in Iowa
