= Plainfield, Iowa =

- City
- Location of Plainfield, Iowa
- Coordinates: 42°50′40″N 92°32′08″W
- Country: US
- State: Iowa
- County: Bremer
- Incorporated: October 17, 1895

Area
  - Total: 0.34 sq mi (0.87 km^{2})
  - Land: 0.34 sq mi (0.87 km^{2})
  - Water: 0 sq mi (0.00 km^{2})
- Elevation: 942 ft (287 m)

Population (2020)
  - Total: 393
  - Density: 1,173.2/sq mi (452.97/km^{2})
- Time zone: UTC-6 (Central (CST))
  - Summer (DST): UTC-5 (CDT)
- ZIP code: 50666
- Area code: 319
- FIPS code: 19-63210
- GNIS feature ID: 2396218
- Website: www.plainfieldiowa.com

Plainfield is a city in Bremer County, Iowa, United States. The population was 393 at the 2020 census, a decrease of 45, or 10.3%, from 438 in 2000. It is part of the Waterloo–Cedar Falls Metropolitan Statistical Area. The Plainfield post office was established in 1868.

== Geography ==
According to the United States Census Bureau, the city has a total area of 0.33 square miles (0.85 km^{2}), all land.

== Demographics ==
Historical populations
Year	Pop.	±%
1880	293	—
1900	320	+9.2%
1910	288	−10.0%
1920	303	+5.2%
1930	293	−3.3%
1940	362	+23.5%
1950	387	+6.9%
1960	445	+15.0%
1970	446	+0.2%
1980	469	+5.2%
1990	455	−3.0%
2000	438	−3.7%
2010	436	−0.5%
2020	393	−9.9%
Source:"U.S. Census website". United States Census Bureau. and Iowa Data Center; Source: U.S. Decennial Census

=== 2020 census ===
As of the census of 2020, there were 393 people, 163 households, and 105 families residing in the city. The population density was 1,173.2 inhabitants per square mile (453.0/km^{2}). There were 189 housing units at an average density of 564.2 per square mile (217.8/km^{2}). The racial makeup of the city was 96.2% White, 0.5% Black or African American, 0.3% Native American, 0.0% Asian, 0.0% Pacific Islander, 0.0% from other races and 3.1% from two or more races. Hispanic or Latino persons of any race comprised 0.5% of the population.

Of the 163 households, 27.6% of which had children under the age of 18 living with them, 54.0% were married couples living together, 8.6% were cohabiting couples, 20.9% had a female householder with no spouse or partner present and 16.6% had a male householder with no spouse or partner present. 35.6% of all households were non-families. 30.7% of all households were made up of individuals, 11.0% had someone living alone who was 65 years old or older.

The median age in the city was 41.6 years. 25.2% of the residents were under the age of 20; 4.6% were between the ages of 20 and 24; 24.2% were from 25 and 44; 28.5% were from 45 and 64; and 17.6% were 65 years of age or older. The gender makeup of the city was 47.6% male and 52.4% female.

=== 2010 census ===
As of the census of 2010, there were 436 people, 185 households, and 123 families residing in the city. The population density was 1,321.2 inhabitants per square mile (510.1/km^{2}). There were 197 housing units at an average density of 597.0 per square mile (230.5/km^{2}). The racial makeup of the city was 97.9% White, 0.5% African American, 0.2% Pacific Islander, 0.2% from other races, and 1.1% from two or more races. Hispanic or Latino of any race were 0.5% of the population.

There were 185 households, of which 30.3% had children under the age of 18 living with them, 55.7% were married couples living together, 8.1% had a female householder with no husband present, 2.7% had a male householder with no wife present, and 33.5% were non-families. 28.1% of all households were made up of individuals, and 11.8% had someone living alone who was 65 years of age or older. The average household size was 2.36 and the average family size was 2.90.

The median age in the city was 37.8 years. 27.1% of residents were under the age of 18; 7.4% were between the ages of 18 and 24; 24.3% were from 25 to 44; 25.9% were from 45 to 64; and 15.4% were 65 years of age or older. The gender makeup of the city was 50.2% male and 49.8% female.

=== 2000 census ===
As of the census of 2000, there were 438 people, 194 households, and 123 families residing in the city. The population density was 1,347.4 inhabitants per square mile (520.2/km^{2}). There were 202 housing units at an average density of 621.4 per square mile (239.9/km^{2}). The racial makeup of the city was 99.54% White, 0.23% Native American, and 0.23% from two or more races. Hispanic or Latino of any race were 0.91% of the population.

There were 194 households, out of which 29.4% had children under the age of 18 living with them, 56.2% were married couples living together, 7.2% had a female householder with no husband present, and 36.1% were non-families. 30.9% of all households were made up of individuals, and 16.5% had someone living alone who was 65 years of age or older. The average household size was 2.26 and the average family size was 2.85.

Age spread: 24.9% under the age of 18, 9.4% from 18 to 24, 25.6% from 25 to 44, 23.1% from 45 to 64, and 17.1% who were 65 years of age or older. The median age was 37 years. For every 100 females, there were 100.9 males. For every 100 females age 18 and over, there were 91.3 males.

The median income for a household in the city was $39,688, and the median income for a family was $48,750. Males had a median income of $30,536 versus $24,464 for females. The per capita income for the city was $18,156. About 4.6% of families and 8.0% of the population were below the poverty line, including 10.2% of those under age 18 and 5.7% of those age 65 or over.

== Education ==
Nashua-Plainfield Community School District operates area public schools. It was established on July 1, 1997 by the merger of the Nashua and Plainfield school districts. Plainfield houses the intermediate school, while the elementary school and Nashua-Plainfield Junior-Senior High School are in Nashua.

== Notable people ==
- Guy Stanton Ford, former president of the University of Minnesota
- Derek Pagel, football player
