= Kintigh Generating Station =

Coal-fired power plant in New York, US

Coordinates: 43°21′29″N 78°36′14″W

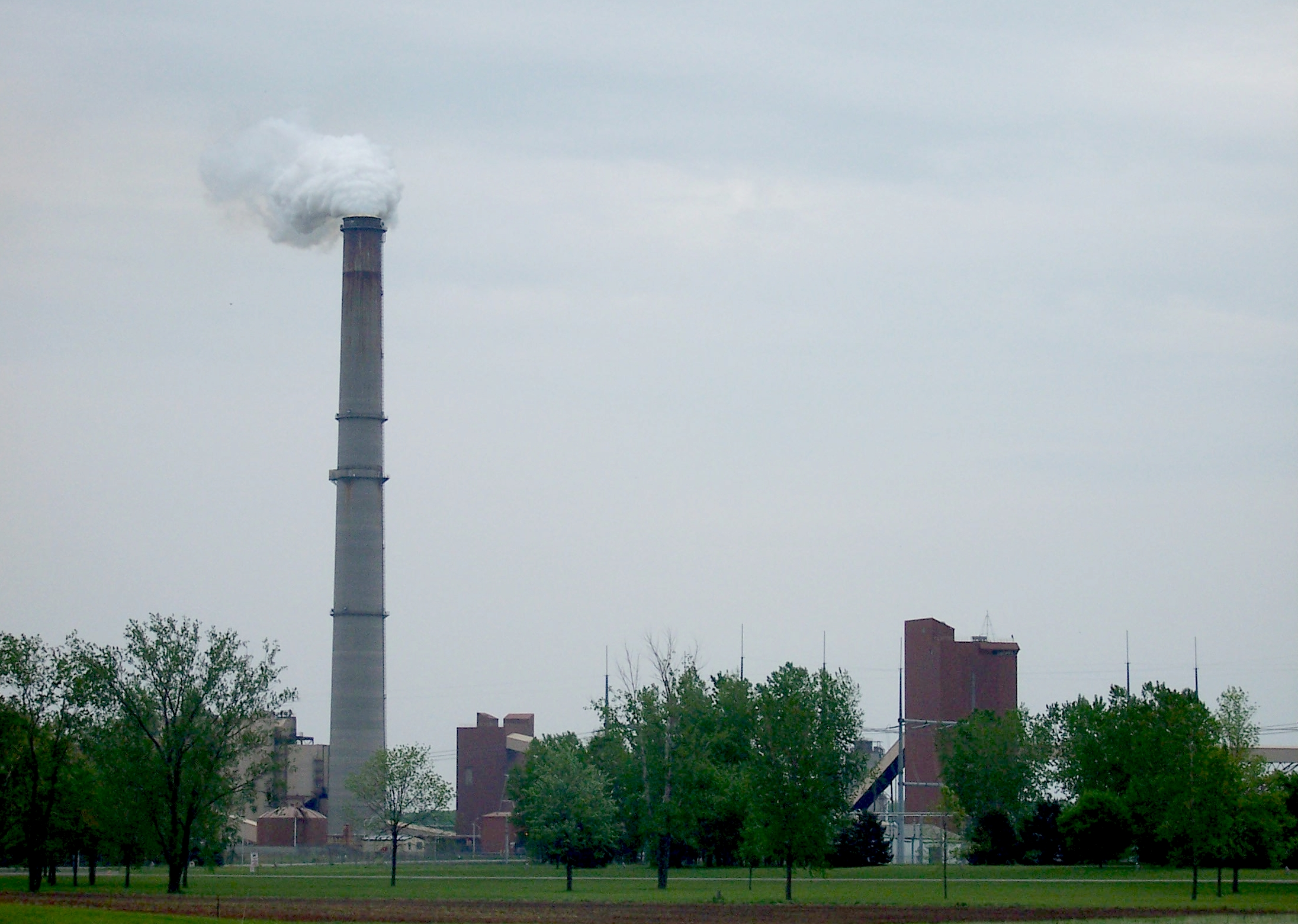
Part of the Kintigh Generating Station, viewed from the west.

The Kintigh Generating Station, also known as Somerset Operating Co. LLC of the Upstate New York Power Producers was a 675-megawatt coal-fired power plant located in Somerset, New York, United States. The plant was owned by AES Corporation until bankruptcy. Its unit was launched into service in 1984. Coal was provided to the plant via the Somerset Railroad. The waste heat was dumped into Lake Ontario, resulting in a warm-water plume visible on satellite images. The plant's 625-foot smoke stack can be seen across Lake Ontario from the shores of Toronto, Pickering, Oshawa, and Ajax, Ontario. It can also be seen from points along the Niagara Escarpment, including Lockport, NY, approximately 20 miles south. Power from the plant was transferred by dual 345kV power lines on wood pylons, which run south from the plant through rural agricultural land. In Royalton, NY they split at their physical junction with the dual circuit 345-kV Niagara-to-Edic transmission line, owned by the New York Power Authority, one circuit heads west to a substation at Niagara Falls, the other heads east to Station 80 south of Rochester. This bulk electric transmission constraint, created by the Somerset plant tie-in and forcing wheeling through 230kV and 345kV transmission lines to the Homer City Coal Plant east of Pittsburgh, PA, and returning to NY at the Watercurry substation outside Elmira, will be resolved through the Empire State Line proposal approved by NY Independent System Operator (NYISO).

The plant's electric power was sold in the NYISO wholesale electric markets. The plant was the last coal-fired plant remaining in operation in New York and officially shut down on March 31, 2020. This in effect fulfilled Governor Cuomo's pledge to phase out coal by 2020, enforced by current regulation requirements which will be in effect on December 31, 2020.

As of 2021, the site was secured through a long-term ground lease by TeraWulf for the Lake Mariner Data Center, also known as the Lake Mariner Data Campus, located at 7725 Lake Road in Barker, Niagara County, New York. The land is owned by Somerset Operating Company, LLC, which is an entity controlled by TeraWulf's co-founder and CEO, Paul Prager. The focus of the site is high-density artificial intelligence (AI), high performance computing (HPC), and digital infrastructure workloads. As its power sources, it uses predominantly zero-carbon energy, including local nuclear and hydroelectric sources.

Additionally found on the site, Somerset solar project is a 125 megawatt solar photovoltaic electric generating facility.

== History ==
The Somerset Nuclear Power Plant was proposed by New York State Electric & Gas in 1974 as two General Electric 1,200 MW units, but the project was canceled in 1975.

In 1975, NYSEG announced it was changing its construction plans because a geologic fault had been found 40 miles away in Attica. Extra retrofitting costs would have made a nuclear plant infeasible versus a reinforced coal . A 650 MW coal plant was built at the site and went into service in 1984 ahead of schedule and under budget.

In 2012, the plant was sold to Upstate New York Power Producers along with the Cayuga plant that AES also owned. The transfer occurred as the result of a bankruptcy settlement with AES's creditors. It was noted in the approving public service commission order that the 5 creditors that own the new organization provided AES $550 million in financing to acquire the facility in 1999. One of the five creditors included the California Public Employees’ Retirement System.

=== Kintigh Electric Energy Production (2006-2012) ===
Year	Net Energy Production (GWh)
2006	5,398
2007	5,609
2008	5,233
2009	3,368
2010	4,596
2011	3,680
2012	2,046

In 2016, Upstate New York Power Producers sold the Kintigh facility and the Cayuga facility to Riesling Power, LLC.

In March 2020, the Kintigh facility was retired.

== Environmental impacts ==
In 2010, the Clean Air Task Force, a nonprofit research and advocacy association, published a report evaluating the environmental and health effects attributable to fine particle pollution from coal-fired U.S. power plants, specifically mentioning the Kintigh Generating Station. The report focused on air pollution from soot, heavy metals, sulfur dioxide and nitrogen oxides. Alleging that fine particle pollution from coal power plants is responsible for 13,000 deaths annually in the United States, it posited that the Kintigh Generating Station's fine particle pollution caused 11 preventable deaths a year, 19 heart attacks and 170 asthma attacks. The Research and Policy Center of Environment New York has also been critical of the Kintigh Generating Station, claiming in 2011 that the plant emits almost 3.8 million mass tons of the greenhouse gas carbon dioxide each year.
