= Philo Newton Cobblestone House =

Historic house in New York, United States

- U.S. National Register of Historic Places
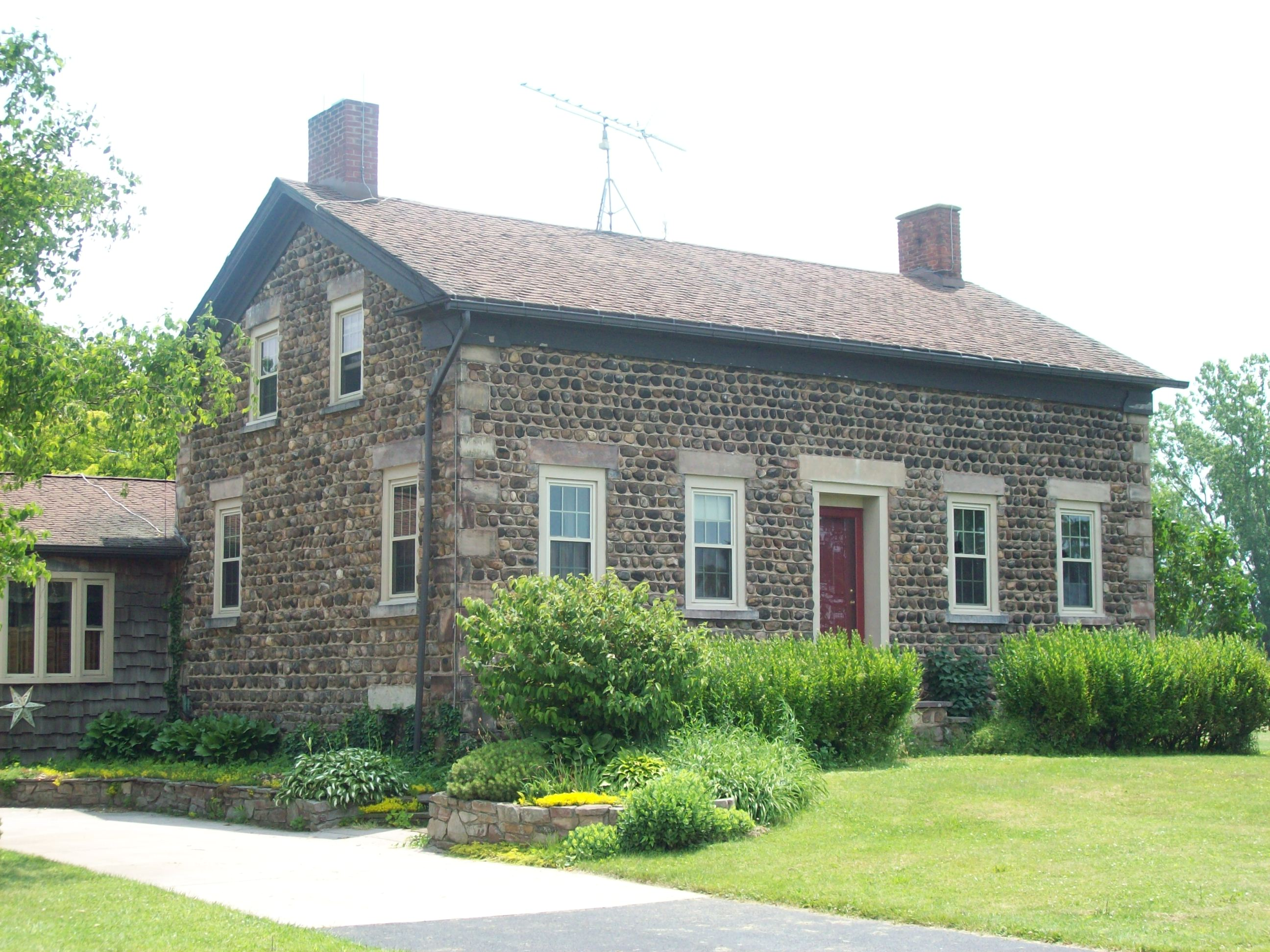
- Philo Newton Cobblestone House, June 2009

- Location within New York Location within the United States
- Location: 3573 Wruck Rd., Hartland, New York
- Coordinates: 43°13′23″N 78°32′4″W
- Area: 117.6 acres (47.6 ha)
- Built: 1830
- Architectural style: Greek Revival
- MPS: Cobblestone Architecture of New York State MPS
- NRHP reference No.: 02001334
- Added to NRHP: November 15, 2002

Philo Newton Cobblestone House is a historic home located at Hartland in Niagara County, New York. It was built about 1830 by Philo Newton, and is a 1 1/2-story, cobblestone dwelling in the Greek Revival style. Also on the property are a contributing well and chicken coop.

It was listed on the National Register of Historic Places in 2002.
