= South Somerset, New York =

Hamlet in New York, United States

Coordinates: 43°18′40″N 78°34′29″W

South Somerset
- Hamlet
- Location in New York
- Country: United States
- State: New York
- County: Niagara
- Town: Somerset
- Time zone: UTC-5 (Eastern)
  - Summer (DST): UTC-4 (EDT)

South Somerset is a hamlet in the town of Somerset in Niagara County, New York, United States.
