= Nashua-Plainfield Junior-Senior High School =

Location
- 612 Greeley Street; Nashua, Iowa 50658; United States
- Coordinates: 42°56′56″N 92°32′28″W

Information
- Type: Public secondary
- School district: Nashua-Plainfield Community School District
- Superintendent: Todd Liechty
- Principal: Karl Smith
- Teaching staff: 24.44 (FTE)
- Grades: 6–12
- Enrollment: 308 (2023-2024)
- Student to teacher ratio: 12.60
- Campus type: Rural
- Colors: Red; Black; Silver
- Athletics conference: Top of Iowa–East
- Team name: Huskies
- Affiliation: Iowa High School Athletic Association (IHSAA); Iowa Girls High School Athletic Union (IGHSAU)
- Website: nashua-plainfield.k12.ia.us/page/3203

Nashua-Plainfield Junior-Senior High School, or Nashua-Plainfield Middle/Sr. High School, is rural public middle and high school in Nashua, Iowa, U.S. It is a part of the Nashua-Plainfield Community School District which serves Nashua and Plainfield.

The school's mascot is a Husky.

== Athletics ==
The Huskies participate in the Top of Iowa Conference in the following sports:

- Football
  - 2-time Class A State Champions (2021, 2022)
- Cross Country
- Volleyball
- Basketball
- Bowling
- Wrestling
  - 2-time Class 1A State Champions (2004, 2012)
- Golf
- Track and Field
- Baseball
- Softball

== Notable alumni ==
- Derek Pagel, former NFL player

== See also ==
- List of high schools in Iowa
