= Amzi Bradley Farmstead =

Historic house in New York, United States

- U.S. National Register of Historic Places
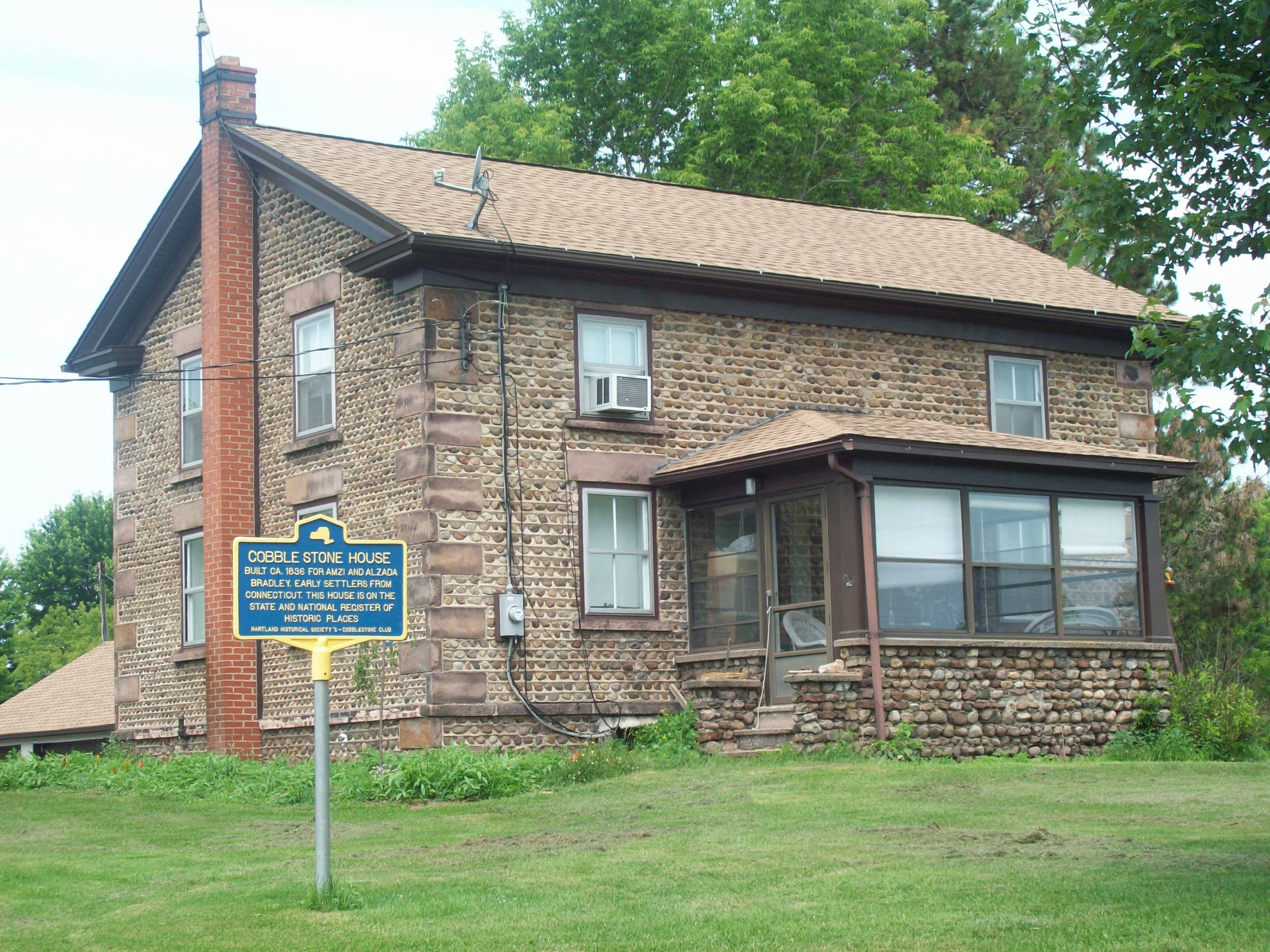
- Amzi Bradley Farmstead, June 2009

- Location within New York Location within the United States
- Location: 8915 Bradley Rd., Hartland, New York
- Coordinates: 43°16′18″N 78°31′24″W
- Built: 1836
- Architectural style: Greek Revival
- MPS: Cobblestone Architecture of New York State MPS
- NRHP reference No.: 02001332
- Added to NRHP: November 15, 2002

Amzi Bradley Farmstead is a historic home located at Hartland in Niagara County, New York. It is a two-story cobblestone structure built in 1836 by Connecticut native Amzi Bradley, in the Greek Revival style. It features irregularly shaped, variously colored cobbles in its construction. It is one of approximately 47 cobblestone structures in Niagara County.

It was listed on the National Register of Historic Places in 2002.
