= West Somerset, New York =

Hamlet in New York, United States

Coordinates: 43°19′38″N 78°36′19″W

West Somerset is a hamlet in the town of Somerset in Niagara County, New York, United States.
