= Ann Weaver Bradley =

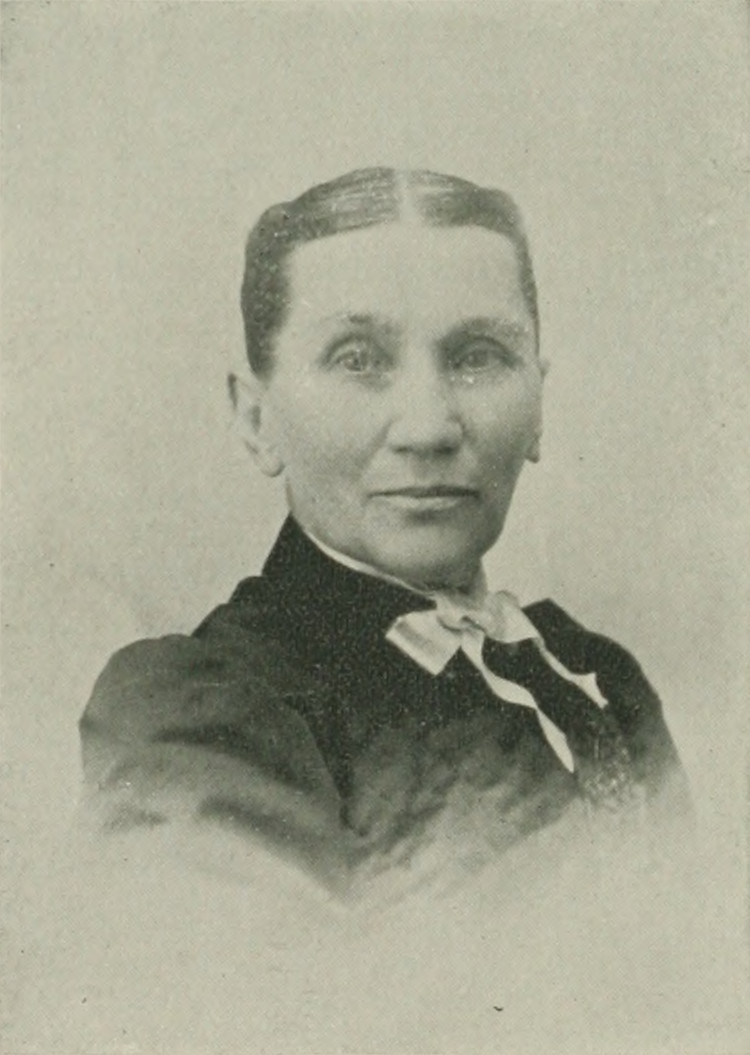
- Portrait photo from A Woman of the Century
- Born: Sally Ann Weaver; May 19, 1834; Hartland, New York, U.S.
- Died: January 30, 1913 (aged 78); Hillsdale, Michigan, U.S.
- Education: Hillsdale College
- Occupations: educator; temperance worker; writer
- Organization: Woman's Christian Temperance Union
- Movement: temperance
- Spouse: George S. Bradley (m. 1858)
- Children: 4

Ann Weaver Bradley (1834–1913), was an American educator, temperance worker, and writer. She did notable work for temperance in Kansas and Michigan.

== Early life and education ==
Sally Ann Weaver was born in Hartland, New York, May 19, 1834. Her parents, William and Mary Earl Weaver, removed from New York to Michigan during her infancy, first settling near the present city of Adrian, Michigan and later to Hillsdale County, Michigan. She was reared in that State. Her early philanthropic tendencies, fostered by home training, prepared her to espouse the anti-slavery cause.

While attending Hillsdale College, she became a Christian.

== Career ==
Her earliest ambition was to become a teacher. Attaining that position before her fourteenth birthday, she continued in that career for thirty years, particularly in the department of literature.

On December 12, 1858, she married George S. Bradley, a theologian from Oberlin, then tutor in Hillsdale, Michigan. Thereafter, she served as a pastor's wife or lady principal in the seminaries under her husband's charge in Maine, Wisconsin, and Iowa.

While in Wisconsin during the civil war, her husband, as chaplain of the 22nd Wisconsin Infantry Regiment, accompanied General William Tecumseh Sherman. While he was in that service, the last one of their three children died.

Bradley returned to Hillsdale and engaged in teaching, At the close of the war, her husband resumed his old pastorate near Racine, Wisconsin, and there for two years they worked. Then followed two years of seminary work in Rochester, Wisconsin, and six in Evansville, Wisconsin. There was born to them their last and only living child, Charles Clement.

Wilton, Iowa, was for the next five years the scene of their work. Then Mrs. Bradley began her public work for temperance. The Iowa agitation for prohibition roused her to action. Stepping into the ranks of the Woman's Christian Temperance Union (WCTU), she organized and carried on a union, a temperance school, and lectured in her own town and vicinity. Later, in central and eastern Kansas, where her husband's work led, her temperance efforts led to three years of invalidism, from which she has never fully rallied.

In the field of literature, she was a prolific writer. Stories and poems followed each other rapidly, all being published in the standard periodicals of the day.

When her husband became pastor of the Congregational Church in Hudson, Michigan, she became Michigan State superintendent of narcotics for the WCTU. In 1893, Mr. and Mrs. Bradley returned to Hillsdale, where in 1900, Mr. Bradley died.

== Death ==
She died in Hillsdale, Michigan, on January 30, 1913, after a long illness.
