= William S. Pitts =

American physician

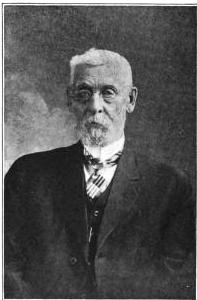
William S Pitts

William S. Pitts (1830 – 1918) was an American physician and composer who wrote the well-known song "The Church in the Wildwood" in 1857.

== Early life in upstate New York ==
William Savage Pitts was born at Lums Corners within the town of Yates in Orleans County, New York on August 18, 1830 to Charles Pitts and Polly Green Smith Pitts who were descended from New England Puritans of English and Scottish ancestry. Pitts was the eighth of nine children and had musical ability from an early age, taking formal music lessons from a graduate of the Boston Handel and Haydn Society.

== Move to Wisconsin and Iowa ==
At age nineteen Pitts traveled with his family to Rock County, Wisconsin where he worked as a rural schoolteacher. In 1857 Pitts traveled to Fredericksburg, Iowa to visit his fiancee, Ann Eliza Warren, a teacher, and along the journey he stopped in Bradford, Iowa. Pitts found particular beauty in a wooded valley formed by the Cedar River. While viewing the spot, Pitts envisioned a church building there and could not seem to ease the vision from his mind. Returning to his home in Wisconsin, he wrote "The Church in the Wildwood" for his own sake, eventually saying of its completion, "only then was I at peace with myself."

By 1862 Pitts was married in Union, Wisconsin, and he and his wife moved to Fredericksburg to be near her elderly parents, and they remained there forty-four years and had three children. Upon his return to the Iowa, Pitts was surprised to find a church being erected where he had imagined it five years before. The building was even being painted brown, because that was the least expensive color of paint to be found and became known as The Little Brown Church. During the winter of 1863-64 he taught a singing class at Bradford Academy. Pitts had his class sing the song at the dedication of the new church in 1864. This was the first time the song was sung by anyone apart from Pitts himself.

== Later life as a physician in Fredericksburg, Iowa ==
In 1865, Pitts moved to Chicago, Illinois, to enroll in Rush Medical College. To pay his enrollment fees, he sold the rights to the song to a music publisher for $25. He completed medical school, graduating in 1868, but the song was largely forgotten for several decades. Pitts practiced medicine in Fredericksburg until 1906.

His first wife died in 1886 and Pitts remarried to Mrs. M.A. Grannis in 1887 and they moved to Clarion, Iowa in 1906. She died in 1909 and Pitts moved to Brooklyn, New York to be with his son, William Stanley Bates, that same year while William was working for the U.S. War Department.

Pitts joined Frederickburg's Baptist church in 1871, and upon moving to Clarion in 1906, he joined the Congregational church there in 1906. After moving to New York in 1909, Pitts joined the Dyker Heights Congregational Church in Brooklyn. Pitts served as mayor of Fredericksburg for seven years, school treasurer for twenty-six years, wrote a biographical local history, and was a Master Freemason. Pitts occasionally performed his most famous song. He died in Brooklyn in September 25, 1918 and was buried in the Rose Hill Cemetery in Fredericksburg, Iowa.
