= North Hartland, New York =

Hamlet in New York, United States

Coordinates: 43°17′20″N 78°36′17″W

North Hartland is a hamlet in the town of Hartland in Niagara County, New York, United States.
