= Levi M. Hubbell =

American businessman and politician (1826–1910)

Member of the Iowa Senate from the 65th district
- In office January 9, 1882 – January 13, 1884

Personal details
- Born: July 14, 1826 Fairfield County, Connecticut, US
- Died: December 23, 1910 (aged 84) Waukon, Iowa
- Party: Republican
- Spouse: Jane E. Wittid
- Children: 2
- Profession: Businessman and politician

Levi M. Hubbell (July 14, 1826 – December 23, 1910) was an American businessman and politician.

Born in Fairfield County, Connecticut, Hubbell was educated at the Oneida Institute; he then moved to Bradford, Iowa in Chickasaw County, Iowa, in 1859, where he worked in business. Then he moved to Winneshiek County, Iowa where he farmed and finally moved to Waukon, Iowa in 1879 where he died. Hubbell served in the Iowa House of Representatives from 1880 to 1884, as a Republican.
