= Hartland (hamlet), New York =

Hamlet in Niagara County, New York, US

Coordinates: 43°14′24″N 78°34′34″W

Hartland is a hamlet in the town of Hartland in Niagara County, New York, United States.
