= The Little Brown Church =

Church in Nashau, Iowa, United States

Coordinates: 42°57′43″N 92°30′29″W

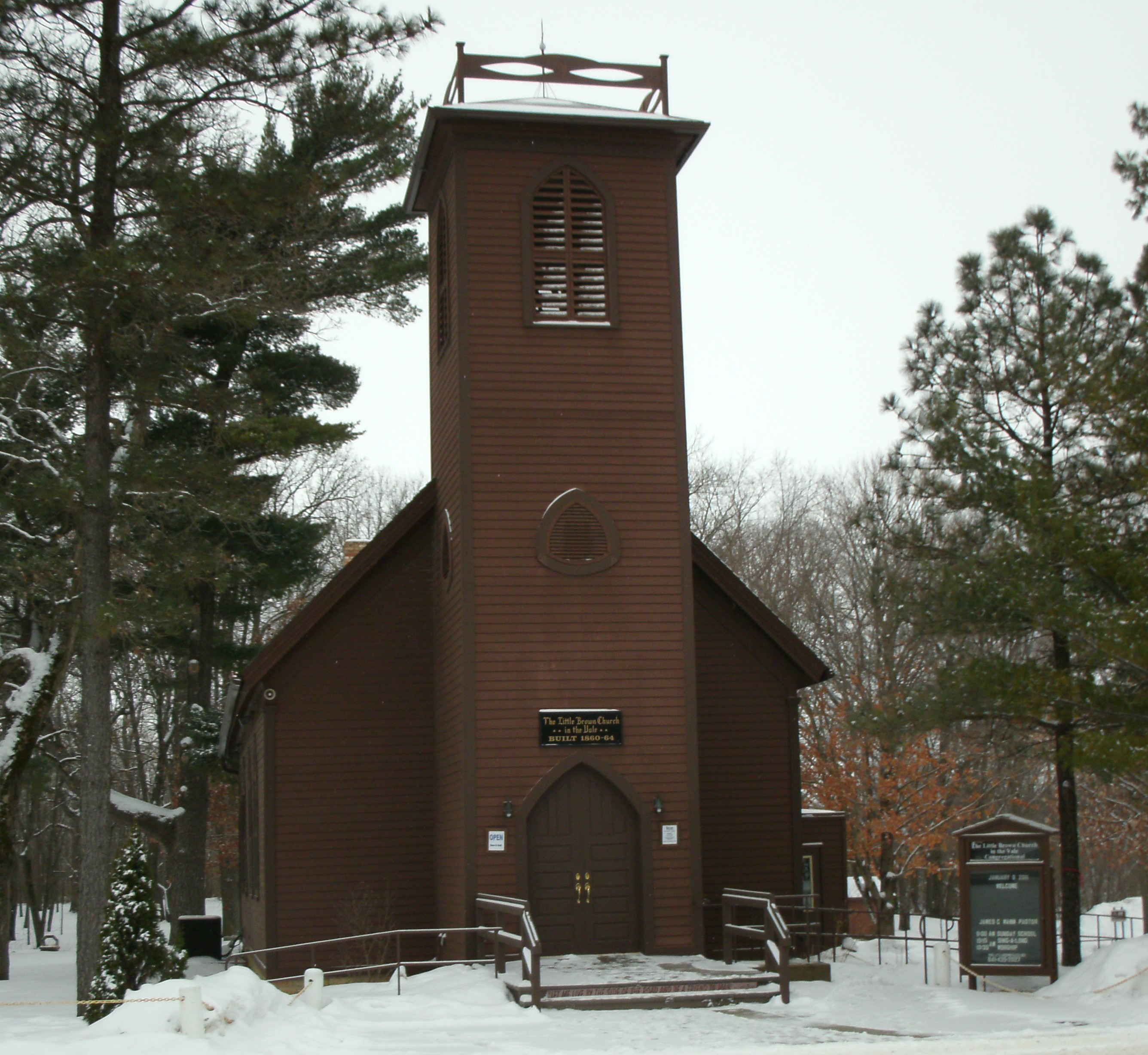
Little Brown Church

"The Little Brown Church" is a historic church located at 2730 Cheyenne Avenue near Nashua, Iowa. It was made famous by a song, "The Church in the Wildwood". The structure was completed in 1864.

== History ==
The music about the church was written by Dr. William S. Pitts in 1857 following a coach ride that stopped in Bradford, Iowa. The church is in a valley near the town, though the church was not actually built until several years later. In the years since, the church has become known simply as "the Little Brown Church". When Pitts returned to the area with his wife in 1862 he discovered a church being erected where he imagined it. The congregation had been meeting in various temporary spaces until Rev. J.K. Nutting led the drive to create a permanent home for the congregation. During this period, Pitts had been teaching singing at nearby Bradford Academy and taught his class to sing his song for the first time at the dedication of the church in 1864. Pitts later sold the rights to the song for a nominal sum. After the church closed in 1888 due to economic downturn in the town, the Society For the Preservation of the Little Brown Church was founded. By 1914, services were again held in the building. Shortly afterward, the small congregation experienced a revival that attracted new attention to it and to its song. Among those who found and loved the song at this time was the Weatherwax Quartet. This group of traveling singers traveled throughout Canada and the United States in the 1920s and '30s and used as their trademark song "The Church in the Wildwood." They would quite easily talk about the little church during their travels. As the song grew in popularity, coupled with the development of the U.S. Highway system in the mid-1920s, many visitors came to the newly reopened little church. Since then the church has become a popular tourist spot, and remains so today. It attracts thousands of visitors every year to see or be married in the "little brown church in the vale." The church is currently a member of the National Association of Congregational Christian Churches.
