= Henry H. Bickford =

- Born: March 13, 1838; Ypsilanti, Michigan
- Died: May 20, 1917 (aged 79)
- Burial place: Hartland, New York
- Military career
- Allegiance: United States of America
- Branch: United States Army; Union Army
- Service years: 1861 - 1865
- Rank: Quartermaster Sergeant
- Unit: 8th New York Cavalry
- Conflicts: Battle of Waynesboro, Virginia
- Awards: Medal of Honor

Henry H. Bickford (March 13, 1838 – May 20, 1917) was an American soldier who received the Medal of Honor for valor during the American Civil War.

== Biography ==
Bickford enlisted in the Army from Hartland, New York in October 1861. He received the Medal of Honor on March 26, 1865, for his actions at the Battle of Waynesboro, Virginia. He mustered out with his regiment in June 1865.

== Medal of Honor citation ==
Citation:

Recapture of flag.

== See also ==
- List of American Civil War Medal of Honor recipients: A-F
