= The Church in the Wildwood =

1857 song

"The Church in the Wildwood" is a song that was written by Dr. William S. Pitts in 1857 following a coach ride that stopped in Bradford, Iowa. It is a song about a church in a valley near the town, though the church was not actually built until several years later. In the years since, the church has become known simply as "the Little Brown Church".

== Origins of the song ==
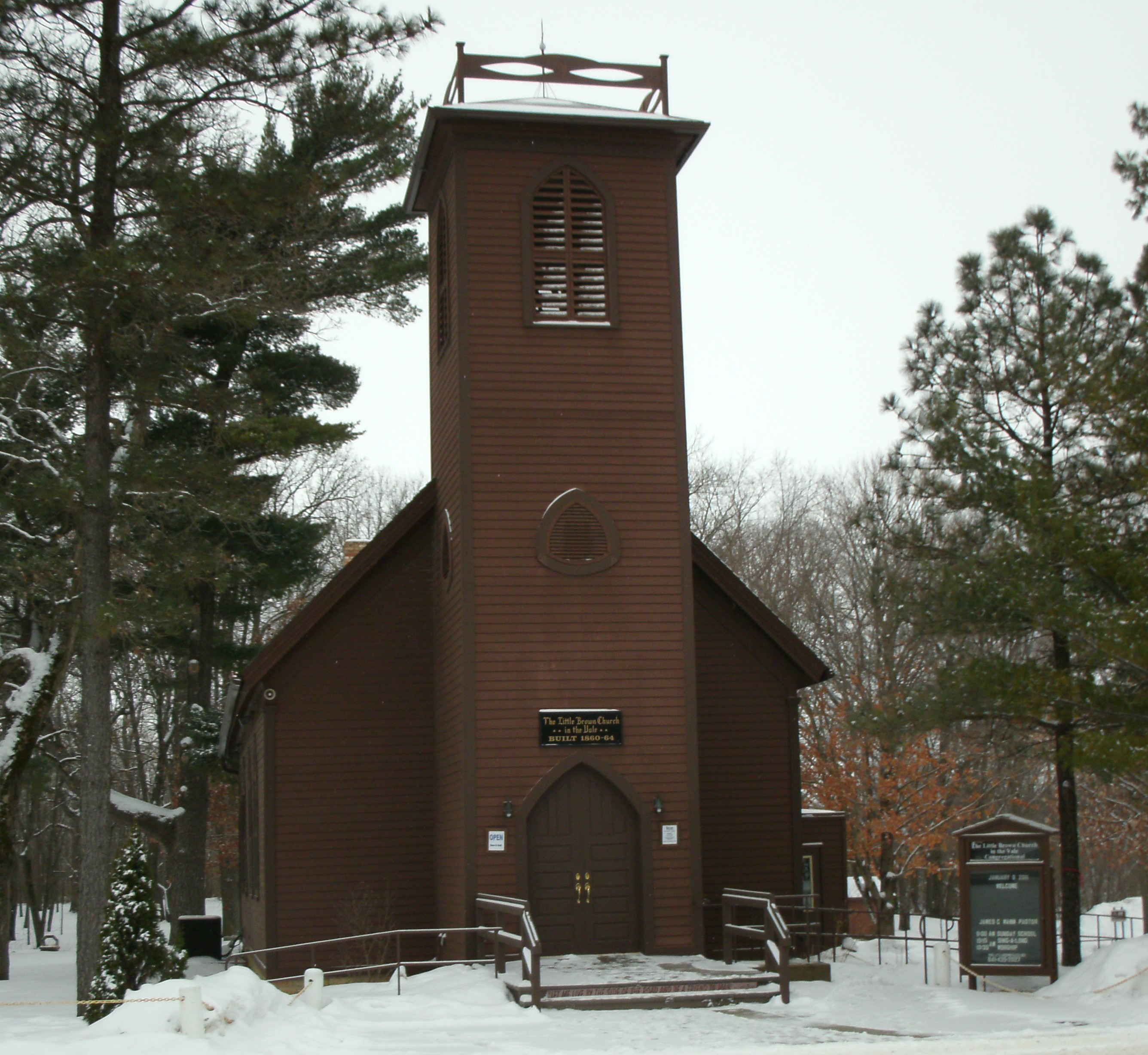
Little Brown Church

During a stagecoach ride to visit his fiancée in Fredericksburg, Iowa, the stage stopped at Bradford and allowed Pitts to wander in the area and enjoy the woodlands. Pitts found particular beauty in a wooded valley formed by the Cedar River. While viewing the spot, Pitts envisioned a church building there and could not seem to ease the vision from his mind. Returning to his home in Wisconsin, he wrote "The Church in the Wildwood" for his own sake, eventually saying of its completion, "only then was I at peace with myself."

By 1862 Pitts was married, and he and his wife moved to Fredericksburg to be near her elderly parents. He was surprised upon his return to the area to find a church being erected where he had imagined it five years before. The building was even being painted brown, because that was the least expensive color of paint to be found. During the winter of 1863-64, Pitts taught a singing class at Bradford Academy. He had his class sing the song at the dedication of the new church in 1864. This was the first time the song was sung by anyone apart from Pitts himself.

== Forgetting of the song ==
In 1865, Pitts moved to Chicago, Illinois, to enroll in Rush Medical College. To pay his enrollment fees, he sold the rights to the song to a music publisher for $25. He completed medical school, graduating in 1868, but the song was again forgotten.

Nearing the twentieth century, small Bradford was in great decline. The village had been bypassed by a new railroad through Nashua, Iowa, two miles west, and the flour mill moved to New Hampton, Iowa to be on a bigger river. The town was once the county seat, but population was in steady decline, and the church had grown neglected. In 1888, the church was closed.

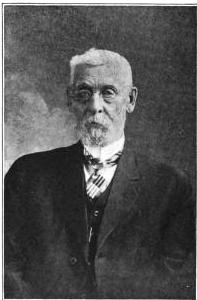
William S. Pitts

== Popularity of the song ==
Shortly into the new century, the Society For The Preservation of The Little Brown Church was founded, and by 1914, services were again held in the building. Shortly afterward, the small congregation experienced a revival that attracted new attention to it and to its song.

Among those who found and loved the song at this time was the Weatherwax Quartet. This group of traveling singers traveled throughout Canada and the United States in the 1920s and '30s and used as their trademark song "The Church in the Wildwood." They would quite easily talk about the little church during their travels.

As the song grew in popularity, coupled with the development of the U.S. Highway system in the mid-1920s, many visitors came to the newly reopened little church. Since then the church has become a popular tourist spot, and remains so today. It attracts thousands of visitors every year to see or be married in "the little brown church in the vale."

The song was also popularized in an episode of The Andy Griffith Show titled Man in a Hurry from season 3.
