= Somerset (hamlet), New York =

Hamlet in New York, United States

Coordinates: 43°20′51″N 78°33′21″W

Somerset is a hamlet in the town of Somerset in Niagara County, New York, United States.
