= Thirty Mile Point Light =

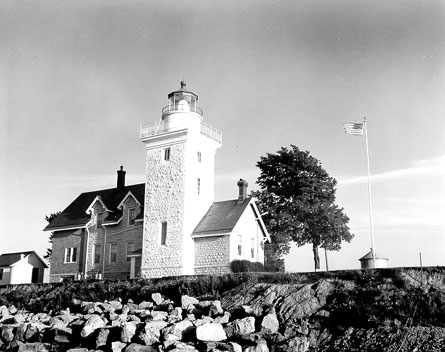
- Location: Lake Ontario
- Coordinates: 43°22′30″N 78°29′11″W

Tower
- Constructed: 1876
- Foundation: Limestone Block
- Construction: Limestone
- Automated: 1959
- Height: 61 feet (19 m)
- Shape: Square
- Markings: Natural w/ White, Black and Red Lantern
- Heritage: National Register of Historic Places listed place

Light
- First lit: 1998
- Deactivated: 1959-1998
- Focal height: 71 feet (22 m)
- Lens: Third Order Fresnel lens
- Characteristic: Flashing White 10s (Fl W 10s)
- Thirty Mile Point Light
- U.S. National Register of Historic Places
- Area: 1.5 acres (0.61 ha)
- Built: 1875
- MPS: U.S. Coast Guard Lighthouses and Light Stations on the Great Lakes TR
- NRHP reference No.: 84003922
- Added to NRHP: July 19, 1984

Thirty Mile Point Light is a lighthouse on the south shore of Lake Ontario in Niagara County, New York. It is part of Golden Hill State Park, a New York state park. The lighthouse is open to the public. It gets its name because it is the point 30 miles east of the Niagara River. The lighthouse was built in 1875 of hand-carved stone. The old tower is being restored.

The lighthouse is listed in the Historic American Buildings Survey as NY-6154. There are three photos available in the survey. It was added to the National Register of Historic Places in 1984.

Thirty Mile Point Light was one of five lighthouses chosen for the "Lighthouses of the Great Lakes" postage stamp series designed by Howard Koslow in 1995. There was one lighthouse chosen on each of the Great Lakes. The four other lighthouses were Split Rock Light on Lake Superior, St Joseph Light on Lake Michigan, Spectacle Reef Light on Lake Huron, and Marblehead Light on Lake Erie.
