= Lyndonville, New York =

- Village
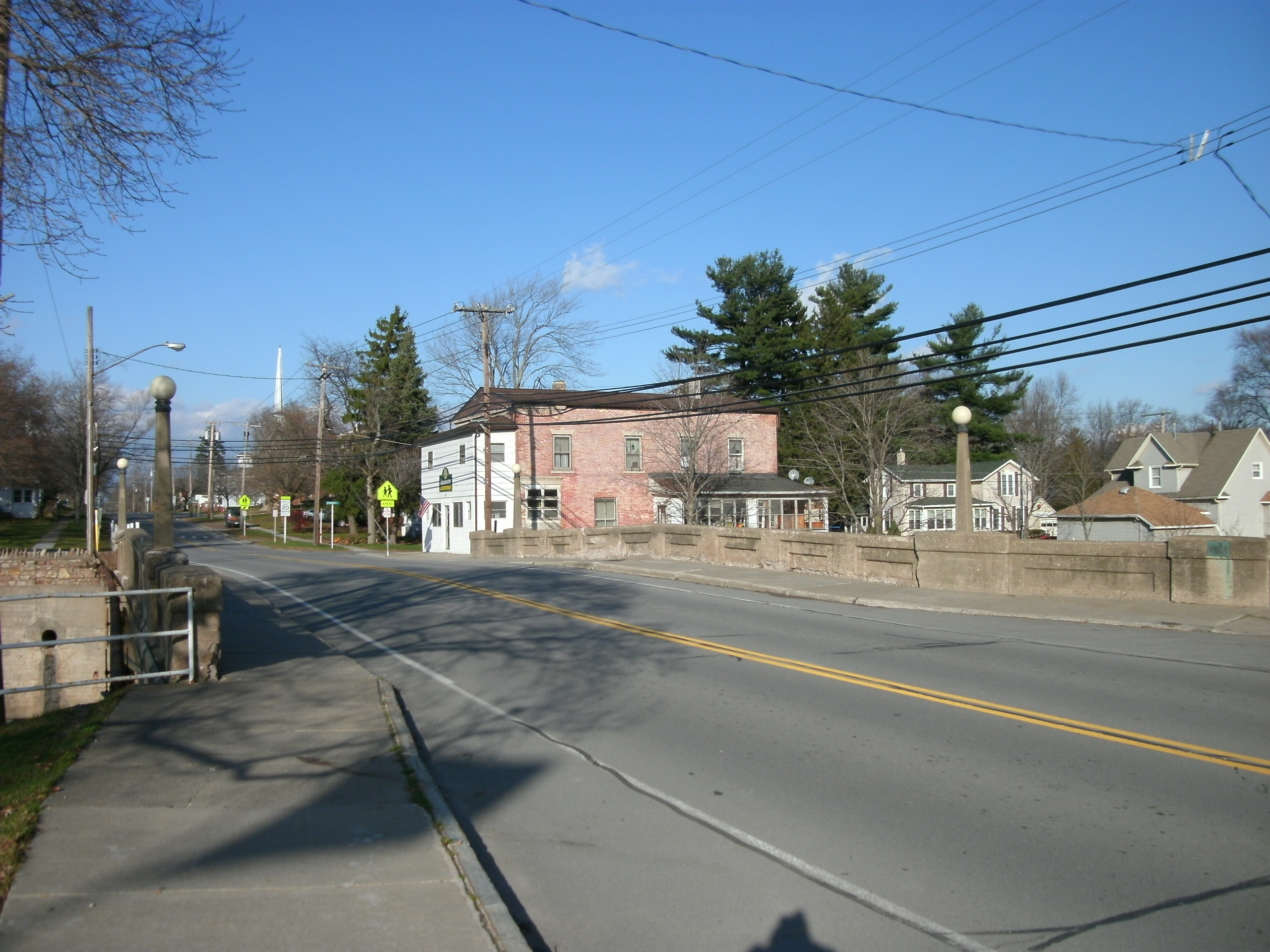
- NY 63 in Lyndonville

- Location in Orleans County and the state of New York.

- Location of New York in the United States
- Coordinates: 43°19′26″N 78°23′16″W
- Country: United States
- State: New York
- County: Orleans

Area
  - Total: 1.02 sq mi (2.65 km^{2})
  - Land: 1.02 sq mi (2.65 km^{2})
  - Water: 0 sq mi (0.00 km^{2})
- Elevation: 322 ft (98 m)

Population (2020)
  - Total: 771
  - Density: 752.6/sq mi (290.57/km^{2})
- Time zone: UTC-5 (Eastern (EST))
  - Summer (DST): UTC-4 (EDT)
- ZIP code: 14098
- Area code: 585
- FIPS code: 36-43918
- GNIS feature ID: 0956178

Lyndonville is a village in Orleans County, New York, United States. As of the 2020 census, Lyndonville had a population of 771. The name was selected because some of the early settlers were from Lyndon, Vermont. It is part of the Rochester, New York metropolitan area.

The Village of Lyndonville is within the borders of the Town of Yates.

== History ==
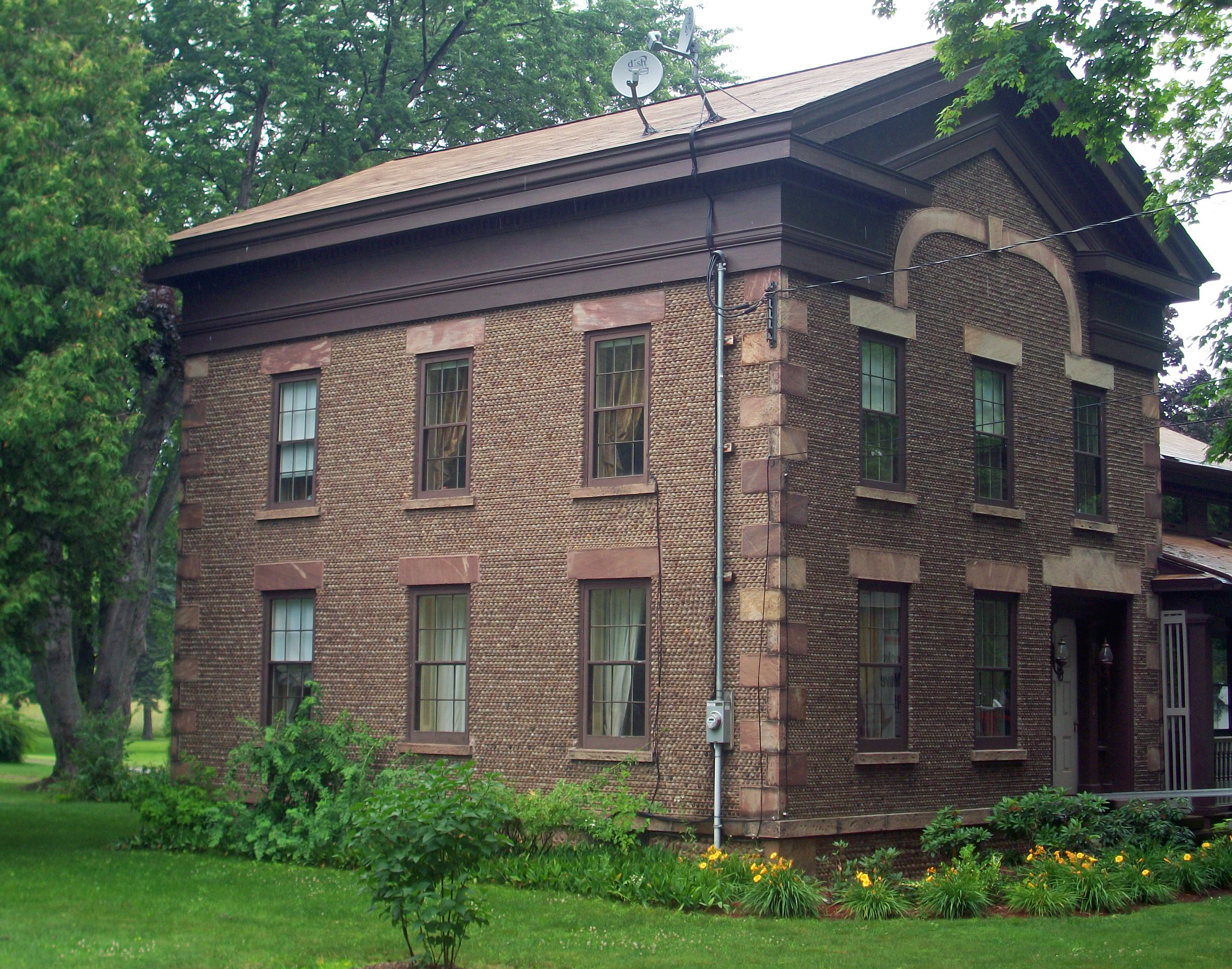
Jackson Blood Cobblestone House

The early settlers moved from Yates Center (north of Lyndonville) to take advantage of water power provided by Johnson's Creek. One of the early settlers was Jackson Blood, whose cobblestone house was listed on the National Register of Historic Places in 2005.

The Village of Lyndonville was incorporated in 1903, separating itself from the Town of Yates.

== Geography ==
Lyndonville is located at 43°19′26″N 78°23′16″W (43.323786, -78.387697).

According to the United States Census Bureau, the village has a total area of 1.0 square mile (2.6 km^{2}), all land.

Lyndonville is located on north–south highway New York State Route 63 (North and South Main Street), south of its intersection with New York State Route 18. It is also about four miles south of Lake Ontario.

Johnson's Creek flows through the village.

== Demographics ==
Historical population
Census	Pop.	Note	%±
1870	400		—
1880	419		4.8%
1910	647		—
1920	738		14.1%
1930	708		−4.1%
1940	745		5.2%
1950	777		4.3%
1960	755		−2.8%
1970	888		17.6%
1980	916		3.2%
1990	953		4.0%
2000	862		−9.5%
2010	838		−2.8%
2020	771		−8.0%
U.S. Decennial Census

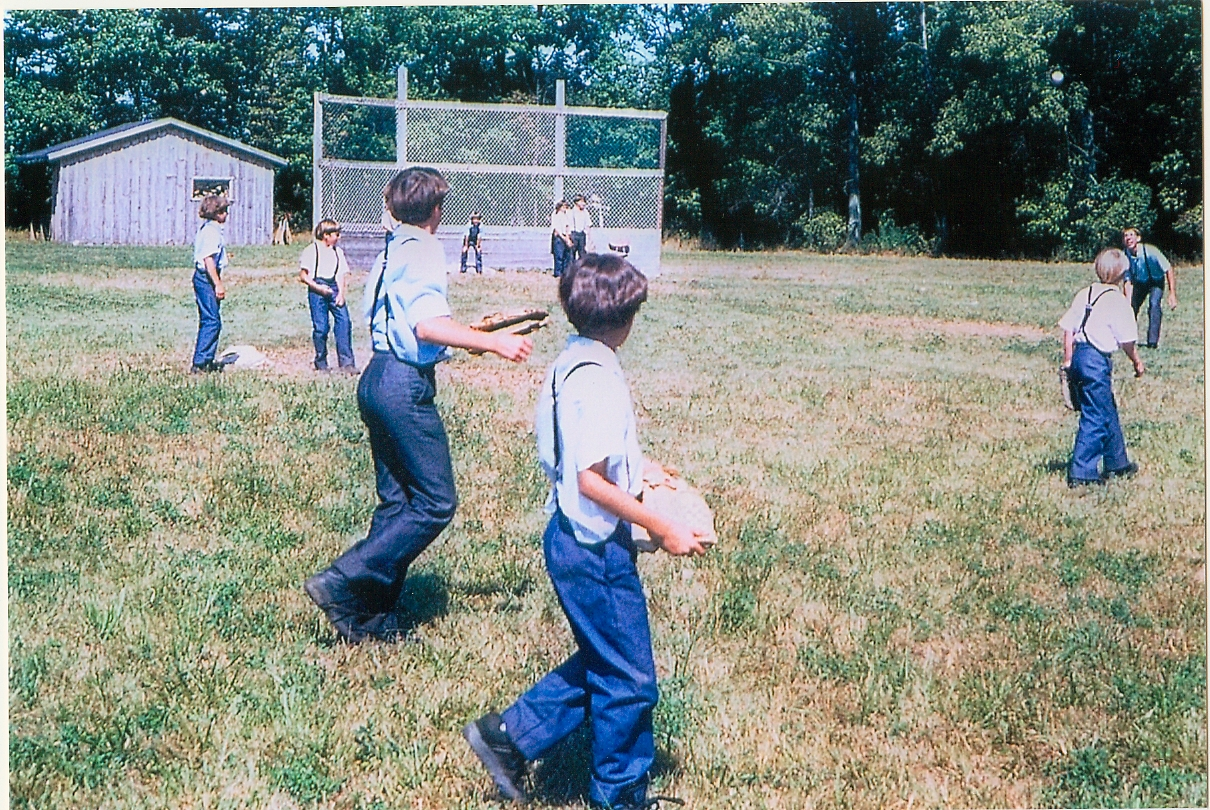
Amish children playing baseball

As of the census of 2000, there were 862 people, 325 households, and 228 families residing in the village. The population density was 841.7 inhabitants per square mile (325.0/km^{2}). There were 344 housing units at an average density of 335.9 per square mile (129.7/km^{2}). The racial makeup of the village was 98.14% White, 0.23% African American, 0.46% Asian, 0.70% from other races, and 0.46% from two or more races. Hispanic or Latino of any race were 1.51% of the population.

There were 325 households, out of which 37.5% had children under the age of 18 living with them, 52.0% were married couples living together, 10.2% had a female householder with no husband present, and 29.8% were non-families. 25.2% of all households were made up of individuals, and 15.1% had someone living alone who was 65 years of age or older. The average household size was 2.65 and the average family size was 3.12.

In the village, the population was spread out, with 29.4% under the age of 18, 8.9% from 18 to 24, 25.9% from 25 to 44, 21.3% from 45 to 64, and 14.5% who were 65 years of age or older. The median age was 36 years. For every 100 females, there were 95.5 males. For every 100 females age 18 and over, there were 90.3 males.

The median income for a household in the village was $40,179, and the median income for a family was $45,500. Males had a median income of $35,769 versus $19,464 for females. The per capita income for the village was $16,357. About 5.9% of families and 9.3% of the population were below the poverty line, including 12.7% of those under age 18 and 8.4% of those age 65 or over.

=== Notable churches ===
Lyndonville has three churches within the village, the Lyndonville United Methodist, the Lyndonville Presbyterian, and Our Lady of the Lake St. Joseph Roman Catholic Church. Lyndonville is also home to a large Amish and Mennonite population.

== Notable people ==
Technical Sergeant Forrest L. Vosler (July 29, 1923 – February 17, 1992), who was awarded the Medal of Honor for his actions during World War II, was born here.

Staff Sergeant David Bellavia The first living recipient from the Iraq war to receive the Medal of Honor was raised here.
