= Nashua, Iowa =

- City
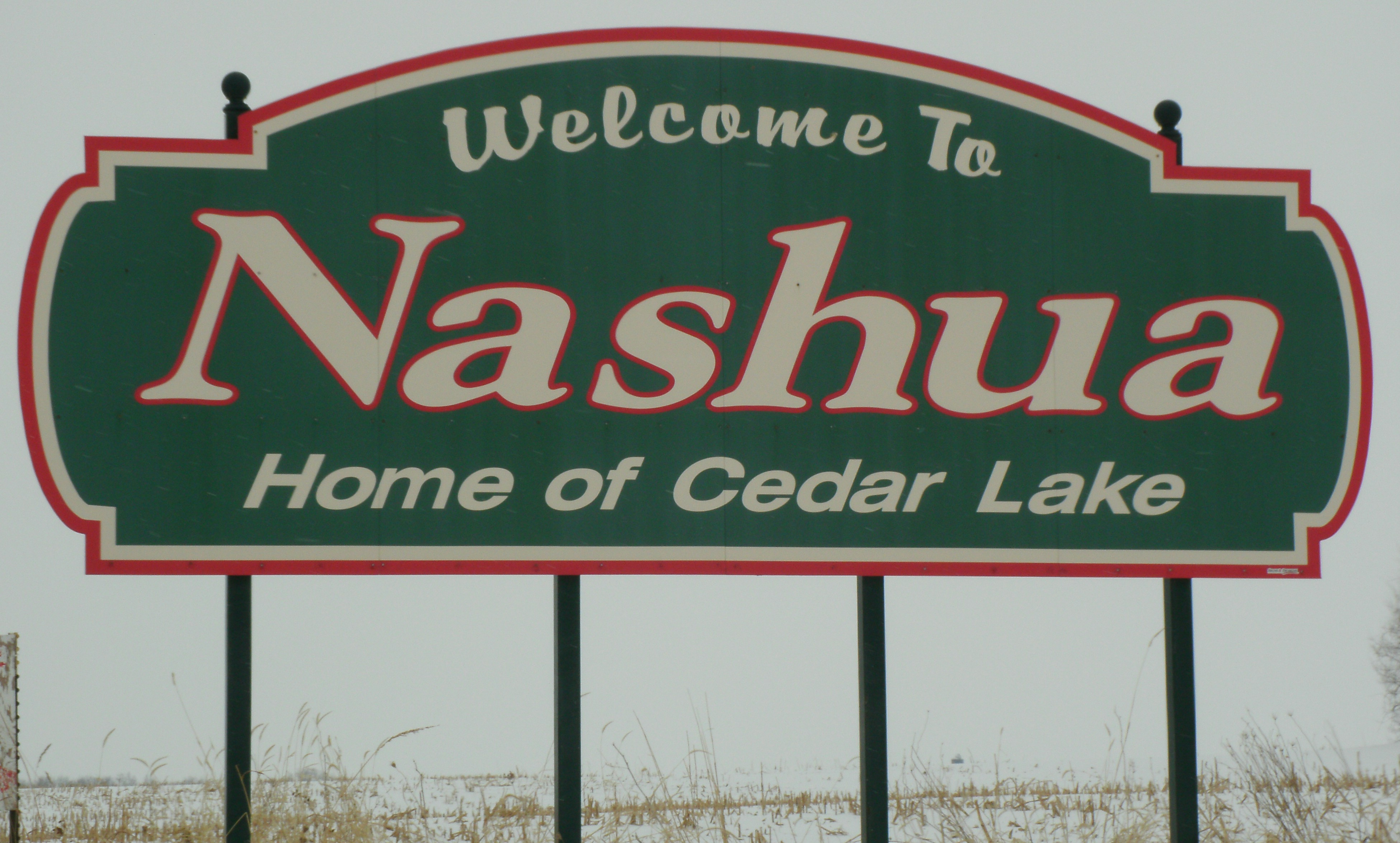
- Nashua welcome sign

- Location of Nashua, Iowa
- Coordinates: 42°57′01″N 92°32′30″W
- Country: USA
- State: Iowa
- Counties: Chickasaw, Floyd

Area
  - Total: 3.18 sq mi (8.24 km^{2})
  - Land: 2.92 sq mi (7.57 km^{2})
  - Water: 0.26 sq mi (0.67 km^{2})
- Elevation: 997 ft (304 m)

Population (2020)
  - Total: 1,551
  - Density: 530.9/sq mi (204.98/km^{2})
- Time zone: UTC-6 (Central (CST))
  - Summer (DST): UTC-5 (CDT)
- ZIP code: 50658
- Area code: 641
- FIPS code: 19-55335
- GNIS feature ID: 2395153
- Website: www.cityofnashuaia.com

Nashua is a city in Chickasaw County and Floyd County, Iowa, United States. As of the 2020 census, the city's population was 1,551, a 6.7% decrease from 2010. The famed Little Brown Church featured in the song "The Church in the Wildwood" is located in Nashua.

== History ==
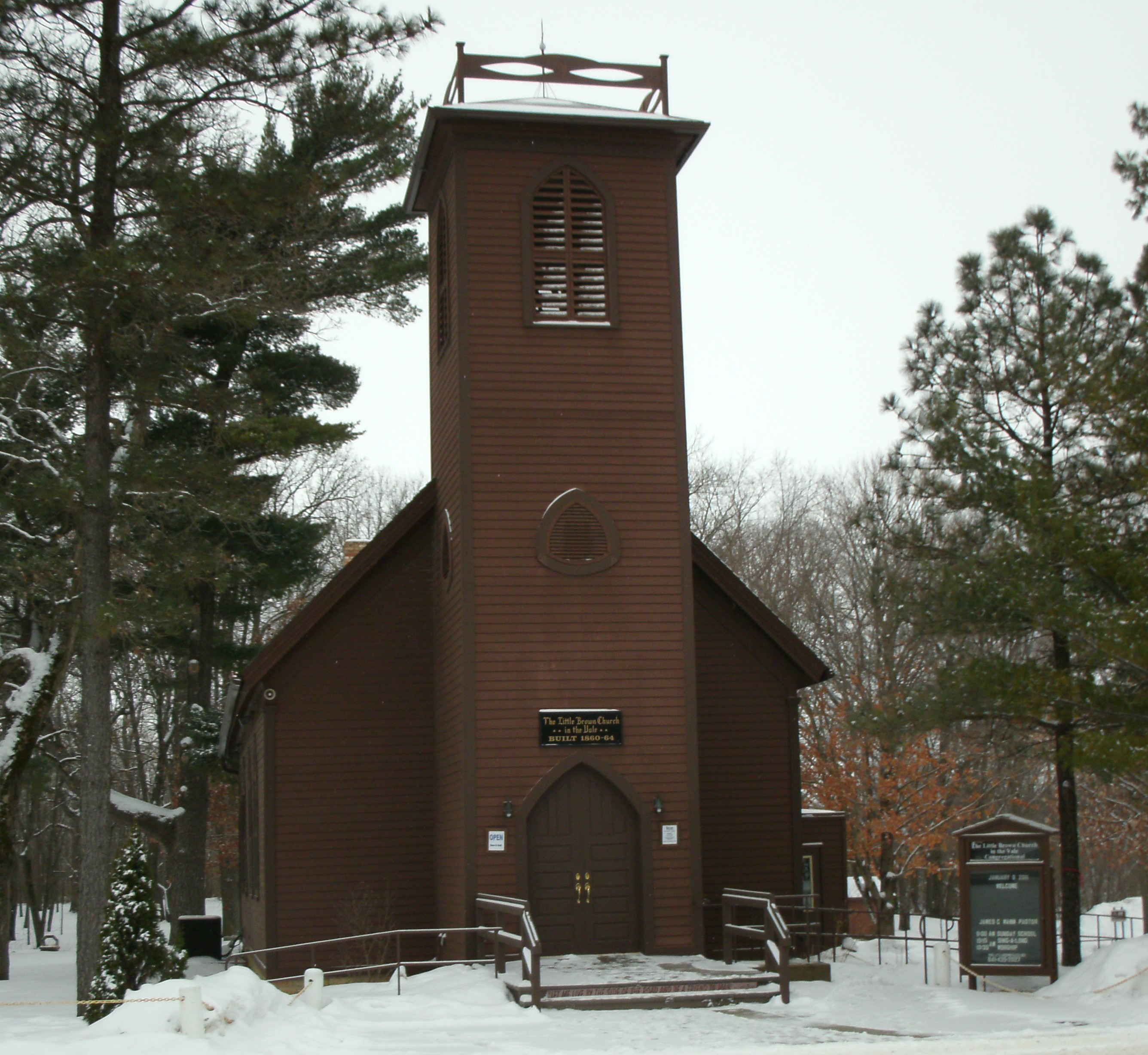
Little Brown Church

Nashua was incorporated as a city in 1869. It is named after Nashua, New Hampshire, the native town of one of its founders.

== Geography ==
According to the United States Census Bureau, the city has a total area of 3.14 square miles (8.13 km^{2}), of which 2.88 square miles (7.46 km^{2}) is land and 0.26 square miles (0.67 km^{2}) is water.

== Demographics ==
Historical populations
Year	Pop.	±%
1870	817	—
1880	1,116	+36.6%
1890	1,240	+11.1%
1900	1,268	+2.3%
1910	1,102	−13.1%
1920	1,317	+19.5%
1930	1,363	+3.5%
1940	1,439	+5.6%
1950	1,609	+11.8%
1960	1,737	+8.0%
1970	1,712	−1.4%
1980	1,846	+7.8%
1990	1,476	−20.0%
2000	1,618	+9.6%
2010	1,663	+2.8%
2020	1,551	−6.7%
Source:"U.S. Census website". United States Census Bureau. and Iowa Data Center; Source: U.S. Decennial Census

=== 2020 census ===
As of the 2020 census, there were 1,551 people, 664 households, and 431 families residing in the city. The population density was 530.9 inhabitants per square mile (205.0/km^{2}). There were 753 housing units at an average density of 257.7 per square mile (99.5/km^{2}).

Of households, 25.6% had children under the age of 18 living with them, 50.3% were married couples living together, 5.3% were cohabitating couples, 26.2% had a female householder with no spouse or partner present, and 18.2% had a male householder with no spouse or partner present. 35.1% of all households were non-families. About 30.4% of all households were made up of individuals, and 14.8% had someone living alone who was 65 years old or older. Of housing units, 11.8% were vacant. The homeowner vacancy rate was 3.9% and the rental vacancy rate was 13.2%.

The median age in the city was 40.8 years. 24.7% of residents were under the age of 18, 26.6% were under the age of 20, 4.6% were between the ages of 20 and 24, 23.1% were from 25 to 44, 24.6% were from 45 to 64, and 21.0% were 65 years of age or older. The gender makeup of the city was 47.6% male and 52.4% female. For every 100 females there were 91.0 males, and for every 100 females age 18 and over there were 90.2 males.

0.0% of residents lived in urban areas, while 100.0% lived in rural areas.

Racial composition as of the 2020 census
Race	Number	Percent
White	1,483	95.6%
Black or African American	5	0.3%
American Indian and Alaska Native	1	0.1%
Asian	1	0.1%
Native Hawaiian and Other Pacific Islander	0	0.0%
Some other race	2	0.1%
Two or more races	59	3.8%
Hispanic or Latino (of any race)	8	0.5%

=== 2010 census ===
As of the census of 2010, there were 1,663 people, 712 households, and 456 families living in the city. The population density was 577.4 inhabitants per square mile (222.9/km^{2}). There were 787 housing units at an average density of 273.3 per square mile (105.5/km^{2}). The racial makeup of the city was 98.6% White, 0.4% African American, 0.5% Asian, and 0.5% from two or more races. Hispanic or Latino people of any race were 0.1% of the population.

There were 712 households, of which 29.6% had children under the age of 18 living with them, 51.5% were married couples living together, 9.0% had a female householder with no husband present, 3.5% had a male householder with no wife present, and 36.0% were non-families. 31.5% of all households were made up of individuals, and 17.7% had someone living alone who was 65 years of age or older. The average household size was 2.34 and the average family size was 2.95.

The median age in the city was 38.4 years. 26% of residents were under the age of 18; 8% were between the ages of 18 and 24; 22.6% were from 25 to 44; 23.5% were from 45 to 64; and 20% were 65 years of age or older. The gender makeup of the city was 49.1% male and 50.9% female.

=== 2000 census ===
As of the census of 2000, there were 1,618 people, 691 households, and 469 families living in the city. The population density was 658.2 inhabitants per square mile (254.1/km^{2}). There were 739 housing units at an average density of 300.6 per square mile (116.1/km^{2}). The racial makeup of the city was 99.26% White, 0.06% African American, 0.06% Native American, 0.19% Asian, 0.06% from other races, and 0.37% from two or more races. Hispanic or Latino people of any race were 0.31% of the population.

There were 691 households, out of which 28.2% had children under the age of 18 living with them, 56.0% were married couples living together, 8.4% had a female householder with no husband present, and 32.1% were non-families. 27.1% of all households were made up of individuals, and 16.8% had someone living alone who was 65 years of age or older. The average household size was 2.34 and the average family size was 2.83.

25.2% are under the age of 18, 7.8% from 18 to 24, 23.5% from 25 to 44, 22.6% from 45 to 64, and 20.9% who were 65 years of age or older. The median age was 40 years. For every 100 females, there were 97.8 males. For every 100 females age 18 and over, there were 92.4 males.

The median income for a household in the city was $31,713, and the median income for a family was $37,284. Males had a median income of $27,969 versus $20,547 for females. The per capita income for the city was $16,031. About 5.7% of families and 9.0% of the population were below the poverty line, including 9.3% of those under age 18 and 8.7% of those age 65 or over.

== Education ==
Nashua-Plainfield Community School District operates area public schools. It was established on July 1, 1997, by the merger of the Nashua and Plainfield school districts. It operates the following schools:

- Nashua-Plainfield Junior-Senior High School
- Nashua-Plainfield Intermediate School in Plainfield
- Nashua-Plainfield Elementary School

== Notable people ==
- Waldo Flint (1820–1900), politician
- A. J. Hinch (1974- ), baseball catcher, manager of the Detroit Tigers
- Charlton Laird (1901–1984), linguist, created the 1971 Webster's New World Thesaurus
- Kent Taylor (1907–1987), actor
