= Barker, Niagara County, New York =

Barker
- Village
- Village of Barker
- Location in Niagara County and the state of New York.

- Location within New York
- Coordinates: 43°19′39″N 78°33′13″W
- Country: United States
- State: New York
- County: Niagara

Area
  - Total: 0.42 sq mi (1.09 km^{2})
  - Land: 0.42 sq mi (1.09 km^{2})
  - Water: 0 sq mi (0.00 km^{2})
- Elevation: 330 ft (100 m)

Population (2020)
  - Total: 575
  - Density: 1,370/sq mi (528.8/km^{2})
- Time zone: UTC-5 (Eastern (EST))
  - Summer (DST): UTC-4 (EDT)
- ZIP code: 14012
- Area code: 716
- FIPS code: 36-04440
- GNIS feature ID: 0943010
- Website: www.villageofbarkerny.gov

Barker is a village in Niagara County, New York. The population was 575 at the time of the 2020 census. Barker is the least populated city/incorporated community in Niagara County. The mail ZIP code is 14012. It is part of the Buffalo–Niagara Falls Metropolitan Statistical Area.

Barker is within the Town of Somerset and was incorporated in 1908. The main crossroad in the town is the intersection of West Somerset Road and Quaker Road (NY 148).

== Geography ==
Barker is located at 43°19′39″N 78°33′13″W (43.327466, -78.553592).

According to the United States Census Bureau, the village has a total area of 0.4 square miles (1.0 km^{2}), all land.

Barker is situated at the junction of West Somerset Road/Coleman Road and Quaker Road (Route 148).

== Demographics ==
Historical population
Census	Pop.	Note	%±
1910	441		—
1920	431		−2.3%
1930	410		−4.9%
1940	452		10.2%
1950	523		15.7%
1960	528		1.0%
1970	567		7.4%
1980	535		−5.6%
1990	569		6.4%
2000	577		1.4%
2010	533		−7.6%
2020	575		7.9%
U.S. Decennial Census

As of the census of 2000, there were 577 people, 211 households, and 150 families residing in the village. The population density was 1,372.3 inhabitants per square mile (529.8/km^{2}). There were 234 housing units at an average density of 556.5 per square mile (214.9/km^{2}). The racial makeup of the village was 98.09% White, 0.69% African American, 0.52% Native American, 0.17% from other races, and 0.52% from two or more races. Hispanic or Latino of any race were 1.56% of the population.

There were 211 households, out of which 38.4% had children under the age of 18 living with them, 54.0% were married couples living together, 10.4% had a female householder with no husband present, and 28.9% were non-families. 24.6% of all households were made up of individuals, and 13.7% had someone living alone who was 65 years of age or older. The average household size was 2.73 and the average family size was 3.19.

In the village, the population was spread out, with 30.3% under the age of 18, 8.1% from 18 to 24, 26.3% from 25 to 44, 21.8% from 45 to 64, and 13.3% who were 65 years of age or older. The median age was 36 years. For every 100 females, there were 99.0 males. For every 100 females age 18 and over, there were 93.3 males.

The median income for a household in the village was $37,411, and the median income for a family was $49,464. Males had a median income of $41,875 versus $21,375 for females. The per capita income for the village was $16,042. About 8.1% of families and 9.6% of the population were below the poverty line, including 11.0% of those under age 18 and 7.6% of those age 65 or over.
