= List of highways in Niagara County, New York =

- Map of Niagara County's highway system

Highway names
- Interstates: Interstate X (I-X)
- US Highways: U.S. Route X (US X)
- State: New York State Route X (NY X)
- County: County Route X (CR X)

System links
- New York Highways; Interstate; US; State; Reference; Parkways

The highway system of Niagara County, New York, comprises 1,673.2 miles (2,692.8 km) of roads maintained by the New York State Department of Transportation (NYSDOT), the county, and its towns and villages. 31 state-maintained highways enter the county, which account for a combined 267.0 miles (429.7 km) of the state highway mileage in New York. 21 of the highways are signed state routes; the other 10 are unsigned reference routes. The state roads are supplemented by 283.2 miles (455.8 km) of county-maintained highways, which carry unsigned county route designations. Niagara County is also served by three byways—the Seaway Trail, the Niagara Historic Trail, and the Niagara Wine Trail.

== Highways ==
=== Interstate and US Highways ===
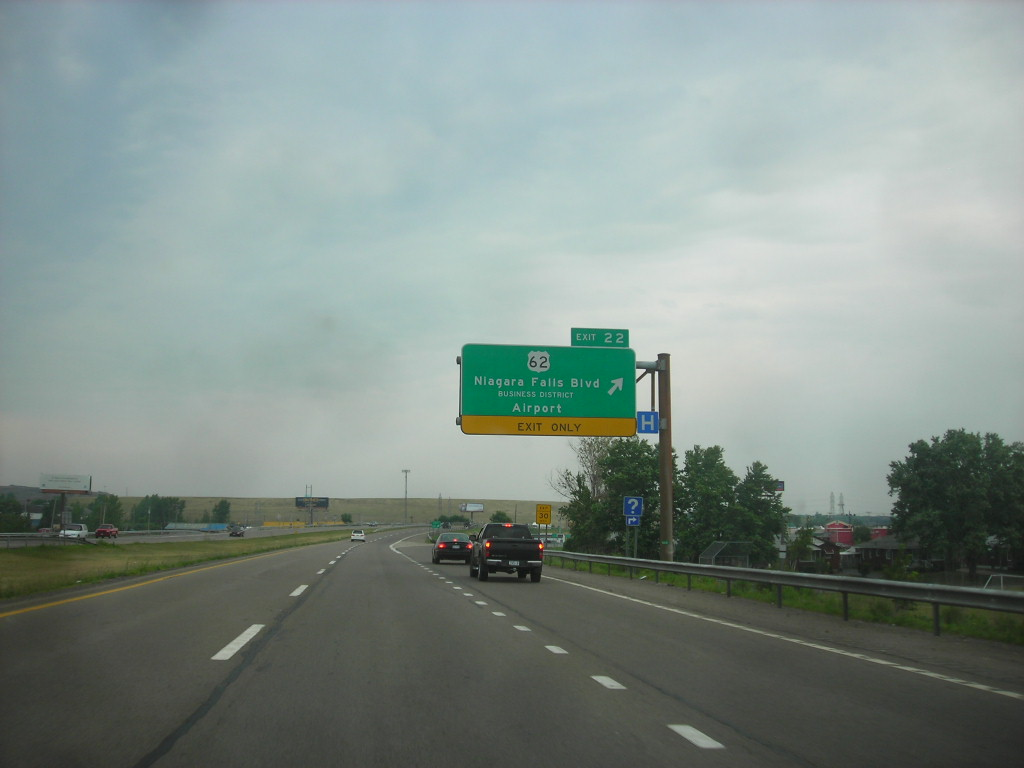
I-190 northbound at US 62 in Niagara Falls

Niagara County is served by three nationally-assigned highways: I-190, an auxiliary Interstate Highway; US 62, a United States Numbered Highway; and US 62's business route through part of Niagara Falls. I-190 heads from Erie County to Niagara County by way of the North Grand Island Bridge over the Niagara River and immediately connects to NY 384, the Niagara Scenic Parkway, and the LaSalle Expressway at a complex interchange on the north side of the bridge in Niagara Falls. The section of I-190 south of NY 384 is also designated as NY 324; however, that route is not signed north of Grand Island. Farther north, I-190 meets US 62 before leaving the city for the town of Lewiston. In Lewiston, the highway trends more to the northwest, crossing NY 31 and NY 104 on its way to the Lewiston-Queenston Bridge over the Niagara River. The bridge carries I-190 to the Canadian border, where it connects to Highway 405 in the province of Ontario.

US 62 enters Niagara County upon crossing Tonawanda Creek northeast of North Tonawanda. It initially heads northwest through the town of Wheatfield as Niagara Falls Boulevard, intersecting NY 425 and NY 429 on its way to a junction with NY 182 near Niagara Falls International Airport. From here, the route takes on a more westerly track as it heads into Niagara Falls. Within the city, US 62 connects to NY 265 and I-190 before splitting into two one-way streets on the east side of downtown. US 62 follows the one-way couplet along Walnut and Ferry avenues (north and southbound, respectively) to its end at NY 104 near the Rainbow Bridge. US 62 Business runs one block to the north of US 62 in downtown Niagara Falls. It follows Pine Avenue from NY 104 just north of downtown to the east end of US 62's one-way couplet.

=== State touring routes ===
21 signed state routes—called touring routes by the New York State Department of Transportation—enter Niagara County at some point along their routing.

==== NY 18 ====
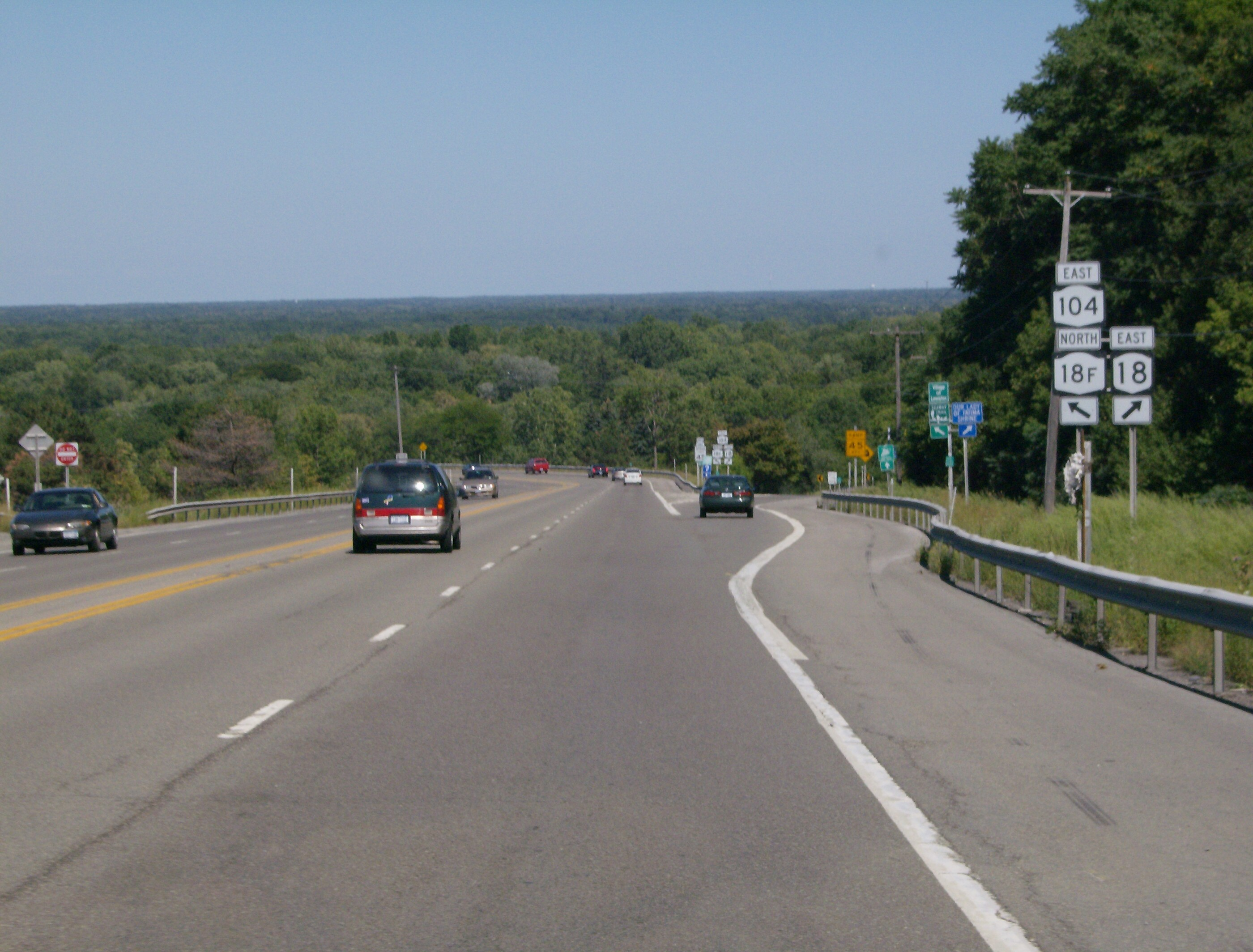
West end of NY 18 at NY 104 in Lewiston

NY 18 begins at NY 104 south of a complex grade-separated interchange that includes NY 18F, NY 104, and the Niagara Scenic Parkway on the eastern edge of the village of Lewiston, north of Niagara Falls. From here NY 18 runs primarily north–south through the western portion of Niagara County to the Lake Ontario shoreline, where it turns eastward to parallel the lake shore across the rest of the county. It crosses into Orleans County at the hamlet of County Line, where NY 18 intersects the north end of NY 269.

==== NY 18F ====
NY 18F is an alternate route of NY 18 through northwestern Niagara County. It begins at an interchange with NY 104 and the Niagara Scenic Parkway just east of the village of Lewiston and runs northward alongside the Niagara River to a junction with NY 18 near Four Mile Creek State Park in Porter. NY 18F parallels NY 18 for most of its alignment, taking a more westerly course than its parent. NY 18F is the only remaining suffixed route of NY 18 and was once part of NY 18 itself.

==== NY 31 ====
NY 31 begins at NY 104 in northern Niagara Falls and travels east–west through central Niagara County as Saunders Settlement Road to the city of Lockport. The route intersects NY 78 on the edge of the Erie Canal in downtown Lockport before continuing east out of the city. Past Lockport, NY 31 passes through the mostly rural eastern portion of the county, serving the village of Middleport before crossing into Orleans County.

==== NY 31E ====
NY 31E is an alternate route of NY 31 between the villages of Middleport and Medina. The route heads north from NY 31, overlapping NY 271 through Middleport along Main Street. Just south of the Erie Canal at State Street, NY 31E splits from NY 271, with NY 31E following State Street eastward out of the village. From here, the route loosely parallels NY 31 while following the canal to the Orleans County line.

==== NY 61 ====
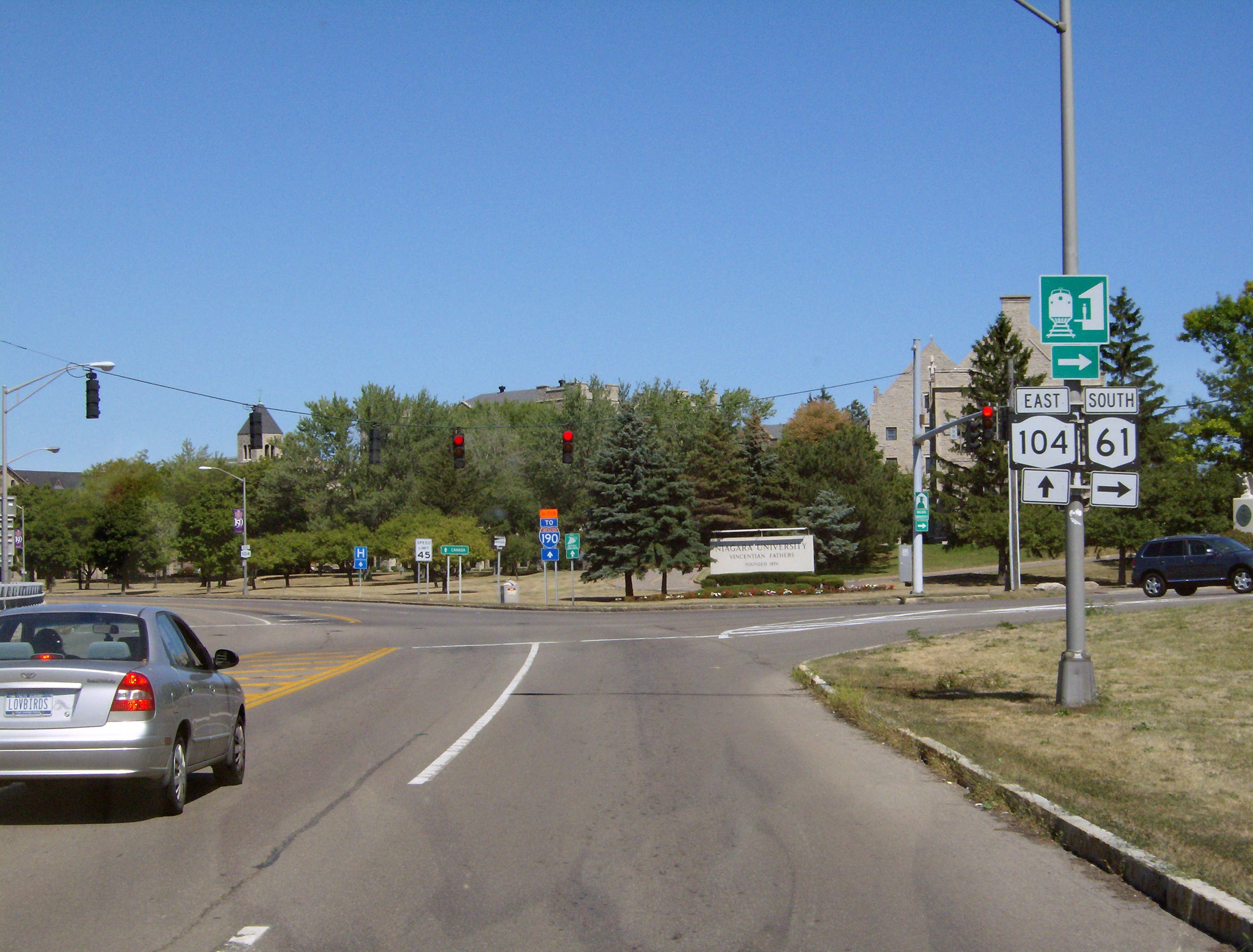
The northern end of NY 61 from NY 104 eastbound in Lewiston

NY 61 is a state highway located almost entirely in the city of Niagara Falls. The road runs across the city in a northwest-southeast direction, following Hyde Park Boulevard from NY 384 in the east end of Niagara Falls to NY 104 in the town of Lewiston.

==== NY 77 ====
NY 77 crosses from Genesee County to Niagara County north of the Tonawanda Indian Reservation. Within Niagara County, the route travels northwesterly across rural areas of Royalton to its north end at NY 31 east of the city of Lockport. NY 77 is known as Chestnut Ridge Road near NY 31 and Lewiston Road in the vicinity of the Genesee County line.

==== NY 78 ====
NY 78 enters Niagara County from Erie County in the south as Transit Road, a major thoroughfare into the city of Lockport. The route intersects NY 93 just south of the city of Lockport, and finally in the city, the miles-long run of NY 78 as Transit Road comes to an end just past the NY 31 junction at the Erie Canal. North of downtown, the highway follows Lake Avenue northeast from Lockport through some rolling countryside. Commercial development returns about 3.5 miles (5.6 km) north of Lockport at Wright Corners, where the highway has a brief concurrency with NY 104. North of NY 104, NY 78 is known as Lockport–Olcott Road until it reaches its northern terminus at NY 18 in Olcott, a small hamlet on the shore of Lake Ontario.

==== NY 93 ====
NY 93 begins in the center of the village of Youngstown at an intersection with NY 18F (Main Street). The route follows Lockport Street east from the junction, connecting to the Niagara Scenic Parkway at the eastern village line before proceeding in an east-southeast direction across the towns of Porter and Wilson. It continues on this track to Cambria, where the route turns eastward to run concurrent with NY 104 for 2 miles (3.2 km) to the Lockport town line. NY 93 leaves NY 104 at this point to follow Townline Road to the western edge of the city of Lockport.

At NY 31, NY 93 turns east, joining NY 31 on Saunders Settlement Road as it heads towards the city. The southward continuation of the road becomes NY 270. Just outside the city limits, NY 93 leaves NY 31 to run southward on the Lockport Bypass. It heads southeast and south across the southwest corner of the city along the bypass to its end at Robinson Road. From here, NY 93 turns east along Robinson Road, which changes names to Dysinger Road southeast of the city and to Akron Road in the town of Royalton. After becoming Akron Road, the route generally southeastward towards Tonawanda Creek and the Erie County line.

==== NY 104 ====
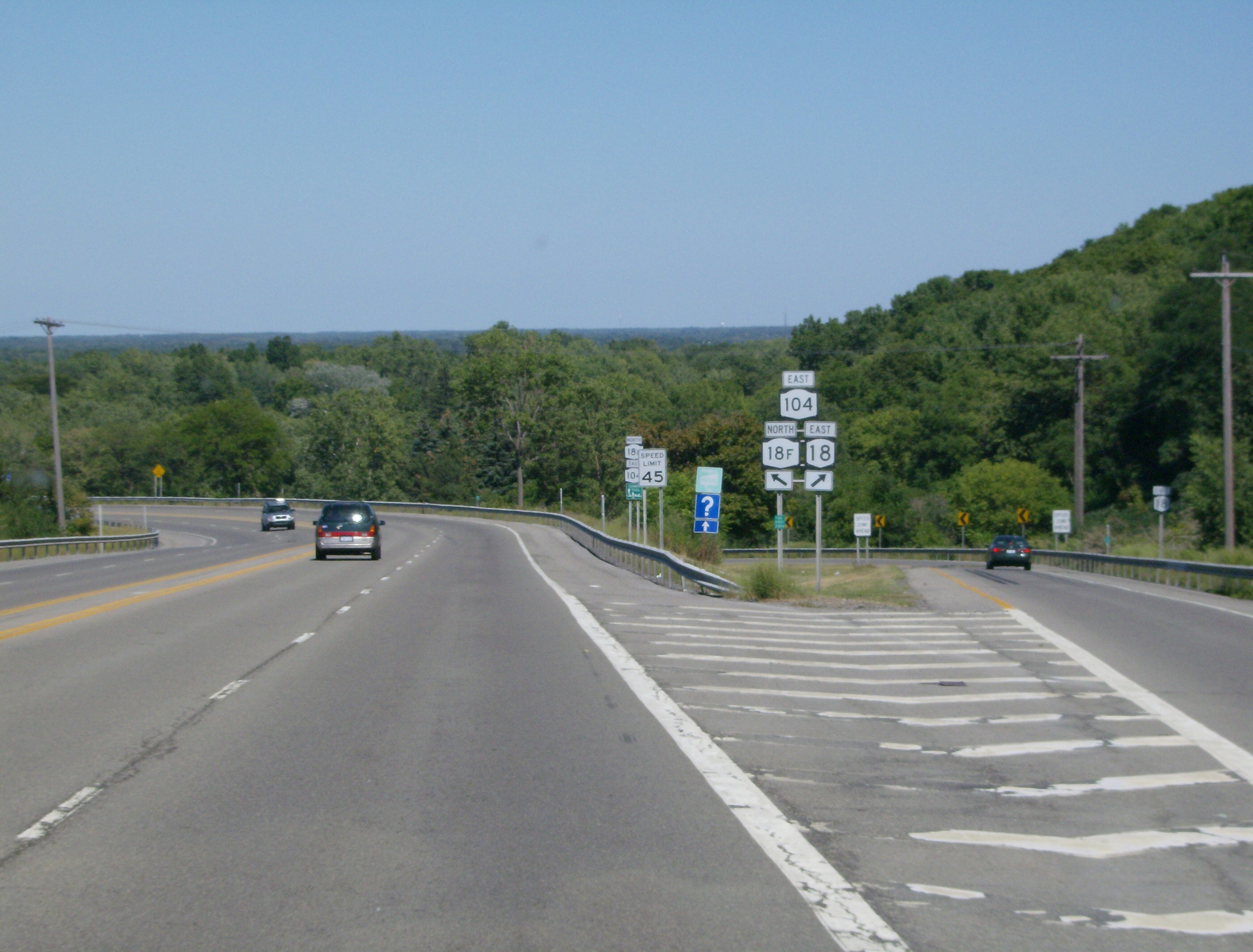
NY 104 eastbound at the western terminus of NY 18 in Lewiston

NY 104 begins at NY 384 just east of the Rainbow Bridge in downtown Niagara Falls and heads north and east across the county on its way toward Rochester. From Niagara Falls, the route travels in north-northeasterly direction along the Niagara Gorge as it heads into Lewiston and connects to the Niagara Scenic Parkway and serves the Niagara Power Visitors Center, known as the Power Vista. Just north of the Power Vista, NY 104 meets I-190 at exit 25 via Upper Mountain Road (unsigned NY 954P). Continuing on, the highway has a junction with nearby NY 265 before descending the Niagara Escarpment toward the village of Lewiston. As the road heads down the ridge, it intersects the western terminus of NY 18 by way of an interchange.

Just east of the village limits, NY 104 connects to the Niagara Scenic Parkway one more time at the eastern terminus of NY 18F. The interchange is also the beginning of NY 104's run along Ridge Road. From here, NY 104 travels east through north-central Niagara County as Ridge Road. As the highway heads across the county, it briefly overlaps with NY 93 in Cambria and NY 78 in Wrights Corners. NY 104 leaves Niagara County at the southern terminus of NY 269, which runs along the Niagara–Orleans county line.

==== NY 148 ====
NY 148 is a north–south route located entirely within northeastern Niagara County. It is named Quaker Road and runs from an intersection with NY 104 in Hartland to a junction with NY 18 in Somerset. NY 148 is maintained by Niagara County as part of CR 15.

==== NY 182 ====
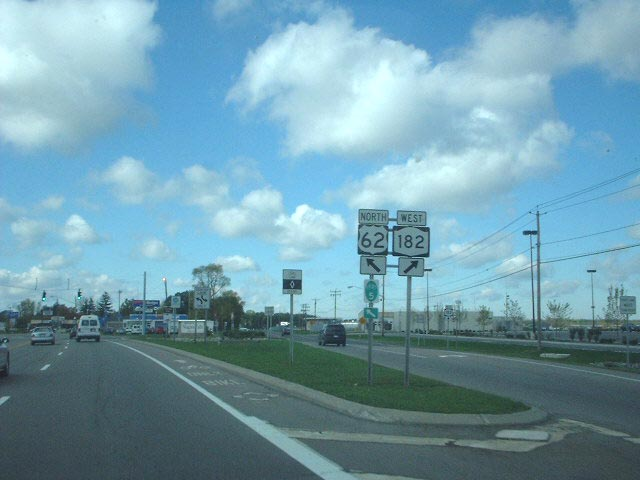
US 62 north at NY 182's east end in the town of Niagara

NY 182 runs across the city of Niagara Falls and the town of Niagara, connecting the Whirlpool Rapids Bridge to US 62 near the Niagara Falls International Airport. NY 182 is known by several names, the most prominent being Porter Road.

==== NY 265 ====
NY 265 enters Niagara County as River Road, and shortly thereafter, joins NY 384 in North Tonawanda. The two highways run together along the Niagara River for 6 miles (9.7 km) to the eastern edge of Niagara Falls, where NY 265 breaks to the northwest to follow Military Road into the town of Niagara. As NY 265 heads northwest, it makes its way to the reservoir at the Niagara Power Project in the town of Lewiston, which it crosses while running alongside I-190. Shortly thereafter, access to I-190 and Canada is provided through Upper Mountain Road, which serves the last exit before the Lewiston–Queenston Bridge and the Canadian border. From there it is an equally short distance to NY 265's northern terminus at NY 104.

==== NY 269 ====
NY 269 runs north–south along the Niagara-Orleans county line for its entire length and is called County Line Road. It runs north from an intersection with NY 104 at the community of Jeddo, passing through Millers and North Ridgeway on its way to a junction with NY 18 in the hamlet of County Line. The road also forms the boundary between the towns of Somerset and Hartland in Niagara County and the towns of Yates and Ridgeway in Orleans County.

==== NY 270 ====
NY 270 is a north–south route in south-central Niagara County. It passes from Erie County to Niagara County by crossing over Tonawanda Creek (Erie Canal) and initially continues due north along Campbell Boulevard. About 3 miles (4.8 km) from the county line, the road bends northeastward toward the city of Lockport. It ends soon after at an intersection with NY 31 and NY 93 west of the city limits.

==== NY 271 ====
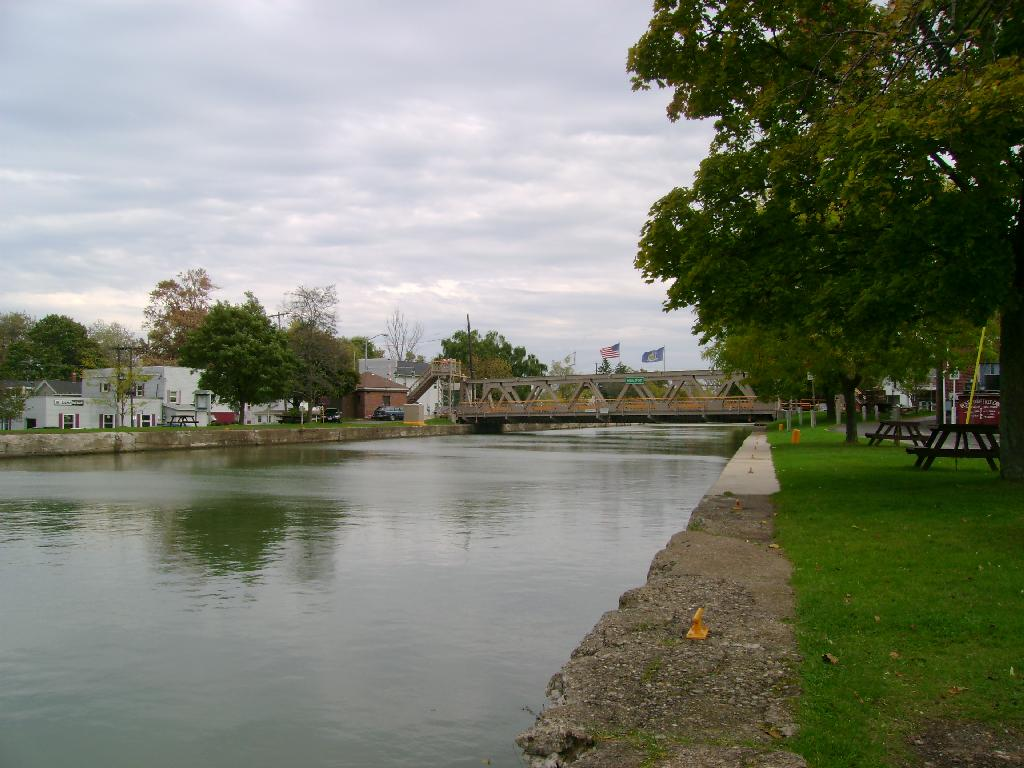
NY 271 (Main Street) crosses the Erie Canal in Middleport

NY 271 is a short north–south highway in eastern Niagara County. It serves as Middleport's Main Street, connecting NY 31 south of the village center to NY 104 in nearby Hartland. The section of NY 271 between NY 31 and the center of Middleport overlaps with NY 31E. In Middleport, NY 31E splits off onto State Street while NY 271 continues north to Hartland. The route is county-maintained as CR 45 from Mill Street (two blocks north of State Street) to the Middleport village line and CR 26 from the Middleport village line to NY 104.

==== NY 324 ====
NY 324 officially begins at NY 384 in Niagara Falls and overlaps I-190 southward across the North Grand Island Bridge to Grand Island, Erie County. This section of NY 324 is not signed.

==== NY 384 ====
NY 384 enters Niagara County as North Tonawanda's Main Street. Shortly thereafter, it joins NY 265 and becomes River Road as the two highways run along the Niagara River. The concurrency ends after 6 miles (9.7 km), with NY 384 continuing along the riverside to provide the southernmost Niagara County exit for I-190. Past the freeway, NY 384 enters the city of Niagara Falls as Buffalo Avenue, intersecting NY 61 at the city line before veering onto Rainbow Boulevard at the eastern edge of downtown. After just one block, NY 384 turns north onto John B. Daly Boulevard at an intersection with the southern segment of the Niagara Scenic Parkway. The route runs along John B. Daly Boulevard to Niagara Street, where it turns west to access downtown Niagara Falls. NY 384 intersects the western terminus of NY 104 in downtown before ending at the eastern approach to the Rainbow Bridge.

==== NY 425 ====
NY 425 enters Niagara County on the Twin Cities Memorial Highway, a four-lane divided highway. From the county line at Tonawanda Creek (Erie Canal), NY 425 heads north through North Tonawanda for 1 mile (1.6 km), connecting to a handful of cross streets on the eastern edge of downtown. The divided highway ends at Wheatfield Street, where NY 425 forks to the northeast and becomes the two-lane Erie Avenue. Once NY 425 reaches US 62 on the outskirts of the city, it assumes the name Shawnee Road and resumes a northerly course across the county. As it continues on, the highway descends the Niagara Escarpment and intersects NY 31 and NY 104 on opposite sides of the ridge. NY 425 remains on a northward track to the lakeside village of Wilson, where it ends at NY 18 near the shores of Lake Ontario.

==== NY 429 ====
NY 429 begins at an intersection with NY 265 and NY 384 in North Tonawanda. The route heads generally northward through the city before heading across Wheatfield as Ward Road. It follows a due north course while on Ward Road, crossing US 62 in Wheatfield and meeting NY 31 in Sanborn as Buffalo Street. The two routes briefly overlap, heading east for two blocks before NY 429 resumes a due north routing along Townline Road. From here, NY 429 follows the Lewiston–Cambria town line to Pekin, where it reaches the edge of the Niagara Escarpment at Upper Mountain Road (CR 5). The road subsequently begins to descend the ridge, and NY 429 ends 1 mile (1.6 km) north of the escarpment at a junction with NY 104.

=== State reference routes ===
Niagara County is served by 10 reference routes, highways maintained by the New York State Department of Transportation (NYSDOT) that carry an unsigned route number for inventory purposes. These are typically highways that NYSDOT has determined are too minor to have a signed number; however, two are internal numbers for roads prominently signed with another name. Like all state-maintained roads, reference routes are inventoried in the field with reference markers, small, green signs posted every tenth-mile along the side of the road. The reference route number is displayed on the marker's first row.

==== LaSalle Expressway ====
The LaSalle Expressway is a short east–west highway located in the southeastern part of the city of Niagara Falls. It runs for 2.62 miles (4.22 km) from I-190 north of the North Grand Island Bridge to Williams Road (unsigned NY 952V) east of the city in Wheatfield. The expressway has three exits along its length that serve the Niagara Scenic Parkway, 77th Street, and NY 384. Its reference route designation is NY 951A, a number used by two separate highways in the Niagara Falls area. The other portion of NY 951A, not connected to the LaSalle Expressway, covers the section of Niagara Street between the Rainbow Bridge and Fifth Street in downtown Niagara Falls.

==== Niagara Scenic Parkway ====
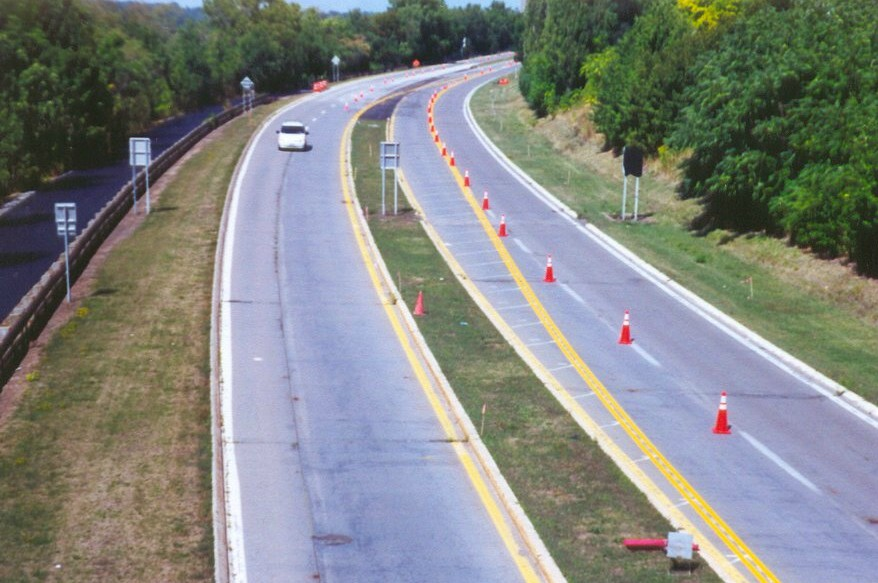
2001 photo of the Robert Moses State Parkway, looking northward at the early stages of converting the parkway into a two-laned road

The Niagara Scenic Parkway (formerly the Robert Moses State Parkway) is a 18.42-mile (29.64 km) north–south parkway in western Niagara County. It was originally a continuous highway between Niagara Falls and Porter; however, a section that passed through Niagara Falls State Park was removed due to low usage, splitting the highway into two segments. The southernmost of the two begins at an interchange with I-190 and the LaSalle Expressway east of downtown Niagara Falls and runs west along the Niagara River to Niagara Falls State Park and the adjacent downtown district. The Niagara Scenic Parkway's north leg starts at Findlay Drive just north of downtown and heads north along the east side of the Niagara Gorge to NY 18 at Four Mile Creek State Park in Porter. A spur route connects the parkway to Fort Niagara, located west of the parkway at the point where the Niagara River flows into Lake Ontario.

The mainline of the Niagara Scenic Parkway is designated as unsigned NY 957A. Its short spur into Fort Niagara State Park and to Fort Niagara is designated NY 958A. Both highways are owned by the New York State Office of Parks, Recreation and Historic Preservation but maintained by NYSDOT.

==== Other reference routes ====
Niagara County's seven other reference routes vary in importance and purpose, ranging from internal designations for bridges traversing the Niagara Gorge to minor connectors between other highways.

- The NY 950U designation belongs to a stretch of Highland Avenue in Niagara Falls between Maryland Avenue and NY 61 (Hyde Park Boulevard). It is only 0.3 miles (0.48 km) in length and is located near Highland's north end at NY 61.
- The NY 951B designation belongs to Walnut Street in the city of Lockport from NY 31 to Pound Street with a distance of 0.4 miles (0.64 km).
- The NY 952B designation belongs to John B. Daly Boulevard in the city of Niagara Falls from the Niagara Scenic Parkway to Niagara Street. Its length is 0.42 miles (0.68 km).
- The NY 952V designation belongs to Williams Road, a north–south arterial just east of the Niagara Falls–Wheatfield city/town line. Williams Road is a busy north–south roadway that travels from NY 265 and NY 384 (River Road) to US 62 (Niagara Falls Boulevard) at the Niagara Falls International Airport. The LaSalle Expressway ends at Williams Road just north of the latter's south end.
- NY 954P is the designation for Upper Mountain Road between the Niagara Scenic Parkway and NY 265 (Military Road) in Lewiston. At six-tenths of a mile in length, the state-maintained section of Upper Mountain Road provides access from the Niagara Scenic Parkway and NY 265 as well as exits onto and off of NY 104 and I-190 (exit 25).

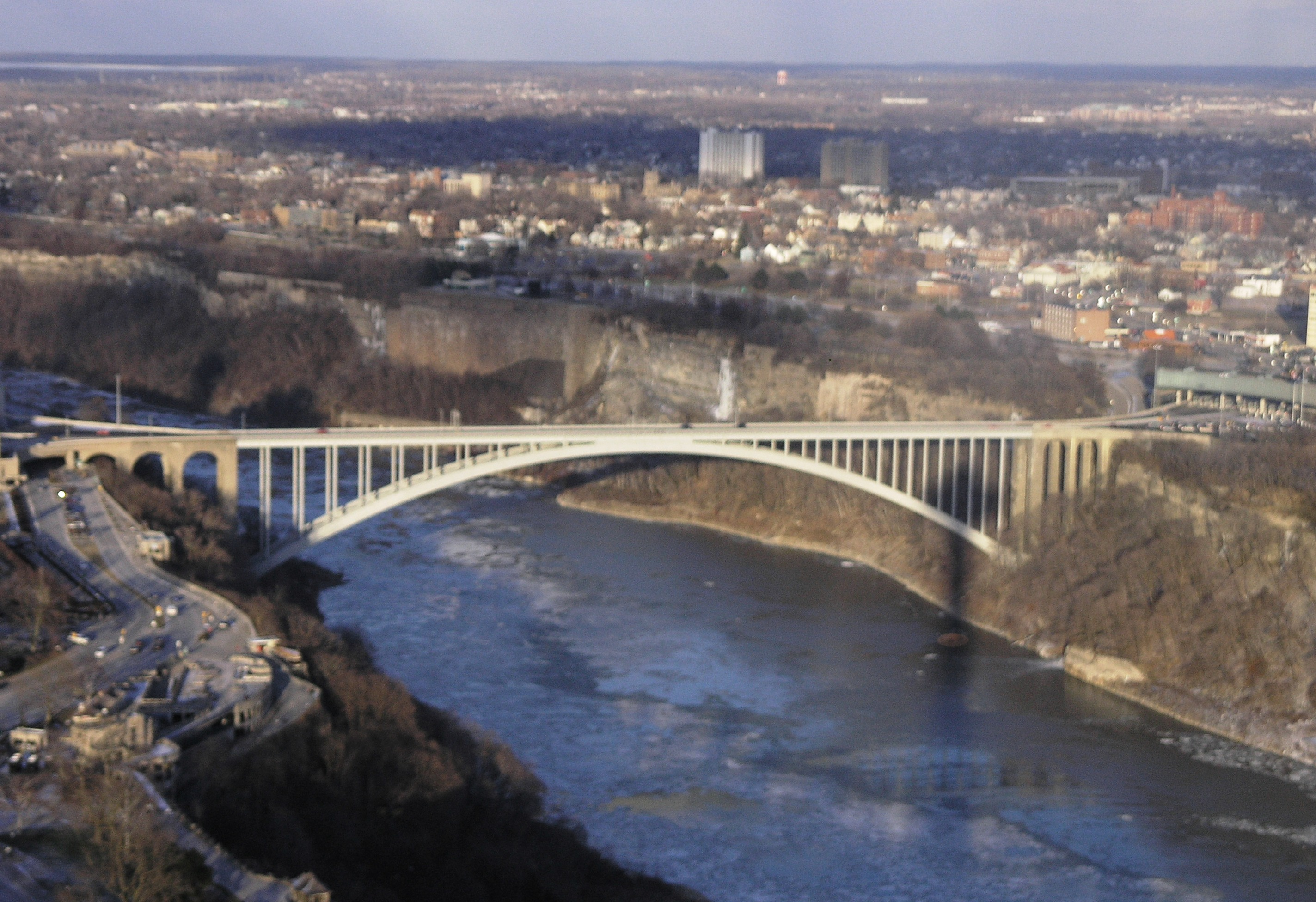
Rainbow Bridge in Niagara Falls, internally designated as NY 955A within New York

- NY 955A is NYSDOT's internal designation for the portion of the Rainbow Bridge within New York. The structure directly links the downtown districts of Niagara Falls, New York, and Niagara Falls, Ontario, Canada.
- NY 955C is NYSDOT's internal designation for the portion of the Whirlpool Rapids Bridge within New York. The structure crosses the Niagara River about 1.5 miles (2.4 km) upstream from the Rainbow Bridge, connecting to the northern portion of Niagara Falls, Ontario. The Whirlpool Rapids Bridge has two decks; the lower is a roadway reserved for passenger vehicles carrying NEXUS subscribers. The east bridge approach directly connects to NY 182, which heads south from the bridge on Whirlpool Street.

=== Former Interstate, US, and state highways ===
A handful of routes once entered Niagara County, but no longer do as a result of realignments, truncations, or other changes to the state highway system.

==== I-90N ====
I-90N is the original designation for what is now I-190, as intercity routes were numbered before three-digit Interstate Highways were assigned to the shorter intracity routes. I-190 replaced I-90N on February 24, 1959.

==== US 104 ====
US 104 was the designation for what is now NY 104 from the mid-1930s to the early 1970s. When the route was assigned c. 1935, it overlapped with NY 18 (NY 34 prior to the 1930 renumbering) from Niagara Falls north to Lewiston and replaced NY 31 from Lewiston east to the Orleans County line. US 104 was redesignated as NY 104 ca. 1972.

==== NY 3 ====
NY 3 originally began at what is now the intersection of US 62 and NY 425 near North Tonawanda. From here, the route headed generally northeast through Lockport on its way to Rochester. In the 1930 renumbering, NY 3 was realigned to begin in Niagara Falls at the modern junction of NY 104 and NY 31. When US 104 was assigned c. 1935, NY 31 was shifted southward from Ridge Road to NY 3's alignment across Niagara County. The shift was part of a larger change in NY 3's alignment that moved the west end of the route to Sterling in Central New York.

==== NY 18D ====
NY 18D was the original designation for what is now NY 182. The route was commissioned as early as 1935 and renumbered to NY 182 when NY 18 was truncated to NY 104 in Lewiston in the early 1960s.

==== NY 18E ====
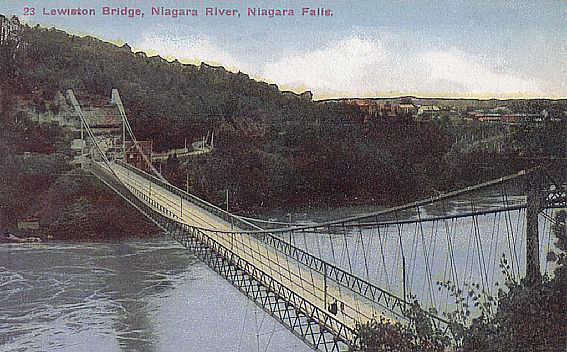
Original Lewiston-Queenston Bridge

NY 18E was a short spur assigned in the 1930s to connect NY 18 (now NY 18F) to the original Queenston–Lewiston Bridge in Lewiston. It was removed in the early 1960s when the original bridge to Queenston was replaced with the modern Lewiston–Queenston Bridge a short distance upstream.

==== NY 62A ====
NY 62A was the designation for Pine Avenue in Niagara Falls. It was originally part of US 62 and was redesignated as US 62 Business in 2006.

==== NY 359 ====
NY 359 was a north–south route in eastern Niagara County. It began at NY 77 in Royalton and ran north through the hamlet of Gasport to US 104 (now NY 104) in Hartland. Its former routing is now part of CR 10 south of the Erie Canal in Gasport and part of CR 108 north of the waterway.

==== NY 950H ====
NY 950H was the original, unsigned designation for the Twin Cities Memorial Highway, a divided highway connecting NY 425 in North Tonawanda to I-290 exit 2 in the town of Tonawanda. It carried the NY 950H designation from the early 1970s to the mid-to-late 1970s, when NY 425 was extended southward over the route.

==== NY 954M ====
NY 954M was an unsigned designation for Akron Road in the towns of Lockport and Royalton, east of the city of Lockport. The road was part of NY 93 until the route was rerouted in 1991 to bypass Lockport on the newly built Lockport Bypass. Ownership and maintenance of Akron Road was transferred to Niagara County in 1998, and Akron Road is now designated but not signed as CR 142.

=== County routes ===
The Niagara County Department of Public Works owns and maintains 283.2 miles (455.8 km) of roads within the county. All county-owned highways carry a county route designation; these numbers are not signed and there is no apparent pattern to how the designations are assigned. Most of the county routes act as primary roads in the less developed areas and also serve to interconnect the various villages and hamlets of Niagara County. The county primarily maintains only the most important connecting thoroughfares; most of the roads in the county, including many of the local through highways, are maintained by the towns.

=== Scenic byways ===
Three byways pass through Niagara County. The longest of the three is the Seaway Trail, a National Scenic Byway.

==== Seaway Trail ====
The Seaway Trail is a 518-mile (834 km) National Scenic Byway that runs across New York and Pennsylvania, following a series of roads and highways that travel along Lake Erie, the Niagara River, Lake Ontario, and the Saint Lawrence Seaway. Within Niagara County, the trail parallels the Niagara River and Lake Ontario.

==== Niagara Historic Trail ====
The Niagara Historic Trail was created in 1975 as part of the 1776 Bicentennial. The trail forms a loop through Niagara County, serving as a scenic byway and connecting various points of interest.

==== Niagara Wine Trail ====
The Niagara Wine Trail links various wineries, farm vistas, and other areas featuring rural life in Niagara County. The byway comprises two routes: the Niagara Wine Trail and the Niagara Escarpment Wine Trail, the latter of which follows the natural land contour of the Escarpment and links Niagara Falls with the main trail. The escarpment trail follows NY 104 out of Niagara Falls and east through Niagara County. In Cambria, the trail diverts onto some local roadways to access other wineries, but the trail continues east on NY 104 through the rest of the county. The trail turns north in Jeddo, a hamlet on the county line, onto NY 269 (County Line Road) and from there heads north along the Niagara–Orleans county line to end at NY 18 (Lake Road). Here, the Niagara Escarpment Wine Trail connects to both the Seaway Trail and the northeast end of the Niagara Wine Trail.

The Niagara Wine Trail follows Lake Ontario and links Wilson Harbor and Amherst. It begins at I-290 in Amherst and heads north along US 62 (Niagara Falls Boulevard) to NY 425 near North Tonawanda. From here, the byway heads north through the central part of the county to the village of Wilson. In Wilson, the Niagara Wine Trail turns east onto NY 18, following the route and the Seaway Trail to the north end of the Niagara Escarpment Wine Trail at the Niagara–Orleans county line.

== List of Interstate, US, and state highways ==
The chart below shows the Interstate, US, and state highways that enter or have previously entered Niagara County, and the towns they serve or served in order of how the road encounters them. The "Formed" column refers to the date that the route was assigned or extended into the county; likewise, "Removed" refers to the date that the route ceased to exist within the Niagara County limits. The measurements given in the "Length" columns refer to a route's length within Niagara County.

Route	Length (mi)	Length (km)	Formed	Removed	Locations served
I-90N	7.52	12.10	1957	1959	Niagara, Lewiston
I-190	7.52	12.10	1959	—	Niagara, Lewiston
US 62	13.24	21.31	1932	—	Wheatfield, Niagara, Niagara Falls
US 62 Business	2.12	3.41	2007	—	Niagara Falls
US 104	37.5	60.4	c. 1935	c. 1972	Niagara Falls, Lewiston, Cambria, Lockport, Newfane, Hartland
NY 3	26.19	42.15	1924	c. 1935	Wheatfield, Cambria, Lockport, Royalton, Middleport
NY 18	36.3	58.42	1924	—	Lewiston, Porter, Wilson, Somerset
NY 18D	6.18	9.95	by 1935	1960s	Niagara, Niagara Falls
NY 18E	0.50	0.80	by 1936	by 1965	Lewiston
NY 18F	9.80	15.77	1940s	—	Lewiston, Porter
NY 31	31.57	50.81	1920s	—	Niagara Falls, Niagara
NY 31E	0.8	1.29	by 1952	—	Middleport
NY 61	3.86	6.21	c. 1962	—	Niagara Falls, Niagara, Lewiston
NY 62A	2.12	3.41	1970s	2007	Niagara Falls
NY 77	10.5	16.90	1930	—	Royalton, Lockport
NY 78	18.0	28.97	1930	—	Lockport, Newfane
NY 93	34.55	55.60	1930	—	Youngstown, Porter, Wilson, Cambria, Lockport, Pendleton, Royalton
NY 104	37.5	60.35	c. 1972	—	Niagara Falls, Lewiston, Cambria, Lockport, Newfane, Hartland
NY 148	7.53	12.12	c. 1961	—	Hartland, Somerset
NY 182	6.18	9.95	1960s	—	Niagara Falls, Niagara
NY 265	13.36	21.50	1930s	—	North Tonawanda, Wheatfield
NY 269	6.36	10.24	1930	—	Niagara–Orleans county line
NY 270	5.8	9.33	1930	—	Pendleton
NY 271	3.21	5.17	1930	—	Middleport, Hartland
NY 324	0.48	0.77	by 1948	—	Niagara Falls
NY 359	3.15	5.07	1930	1938	Royalton, Hartland
NY 384	19.2	30.90	1930	—	Niagara Falls, Wheatfield, North Tonawanda
NY 425	22.2	35.73	1930	—	North Tonawanda, Wheatfield, Cambria, Wilson
NY 429	12.16	19.57	1930s	—	North Tonawanda, Wheatfield, Lewiston, Lewiston–Cambria line
NY 950H	2.87	4.62	—	1970s	Tonawanda, North Tonawanda
NY 950U	0.22	0.35	—	—	Niagara Falls
NY 951A	3.04	4.89	—	—	Niagara Falls, Wheatfield
NY 951B	0.40	0.64	—	—	Lockport
NY 952B	0.42	0.68	—	—	Niagara Falls
NY 952V	1.94	3.12	—	—	Wheatfield
NY 954M	3.47	5.58	1991	1998	Lockport, Royalton
NY 954P	0.60	0.97	—	—	Lewiston
NY 955A	0.30	0.48	—	—	Niagara Falls
NY 955C	0.14	0.23	—	—	Niagara Falls
NY 957A	18.42	29.64	—	—	Niagara Falls, Lewiston, Porter
NY 958A	1.16	1.87	—	—	Porter
LaSalle Expressway	2.62	4.22	1960s	—	Niagara Falls, Niagara
Niagara Scenic Parkway	18.42	29.64	1960s	—	Niagara Falls, Lewiston, Porter
