= List of county routes in Niagara County, New York =

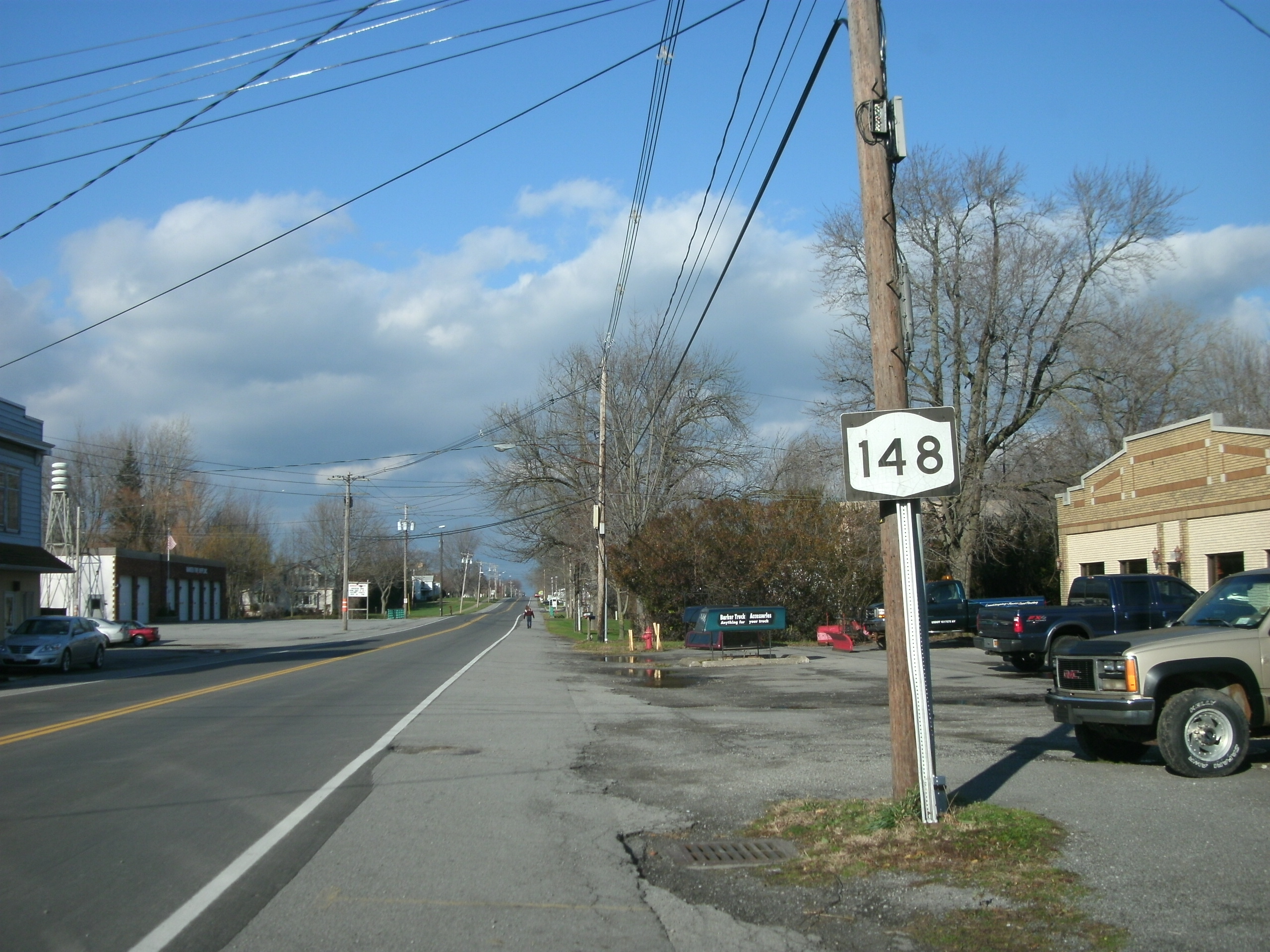
- Looking north along NY 148 (part of CR 15) in the village of Barker. County routes are not signed in Niagara County.

Highway names
- Interstates: Interstate X (I-X)
- US Highways: U.S. Route X (US X)
- State: New York State Route X (NY X)
- County: County Route X (CR X)

System links
- New York Highways; Interstate; US; State; Reference; Parkways

County routes in Niagara County are not signed, and there is no apparent numbering pattern. Most of the county routes act as primary roads in the less developed areas and also serve to interconnect the various villages and hamlets of Niagara County. Niagara County maintains few county routes, including only the most important connecting thoroughfares, and those are maintained by the Niagara County highway department. Most of the roads in the County, including many of the local through highways, are maintained by the towns.

== Routes 1–50 ==
Route	Length (mi)	Length (km)	From	Via	To	Notes
CR 2	1.46	2.35	NY 148 / CR 15 in Barker	Coleman Road	Johnson Creek Road in Somerset	
CR 3	4.79	7.71	CR 24 in Newfane	West Somerset Road	NY 148 / CR 15 in Barker	
CR 5	10.20	16.42	Tuscarora Indian Reservation line in Lewiston	Upper Mountain Road	Lockport city line	
CR 6	14.17	22.80	Niagara Falls city line	Lockport Road	CR 96 in Pendleton	
CR 7	6.60	10.62	NY 78 in Lockport town	Slayton Settlement Road	Root Road in Royalton	
CR 10 (1)	4.54	7.31	CR 136	Gasport Road in Royalton	New York Barge Canal	Segment between CR 108 and NY 31 was designated as NY 359 from 1930 to the early 1940s.
CR 10 (2)	0.21	0.34	NY 93	Gasport Road in Royalton	CR 136	
CR 11	1.97	3.17	NY 265	Upper Mountain Road in Lewiston town	Tuscarora Indian Reservation line	
CR 12	2.33	3.75	CR 58	Rapids Road in Lockport	CR 85	
CR 13	0.64	1.03	NY 425	Loveland Road in Wheatfield	CR 20	
CR 14	1.53	2.46	NY 93 in Lockport town	Beattie Avenue	CR 92 in Lockport city	
CR 15	8.62	13.87	NY 104 in Hartland	Quaker Road	Lower Lake Road in Somerset	CR 15 between NY 104 and NY 18 is co-designated with NY 148
CR 17	6.96	11.20	NY 104 in Lewiston town	Ransomville Road	NY 18 in Porter	
CR 18	3.34	5.38	NY 425	Chestnut Road in Wilson	CR 111	
CR 19	2.97	4.78	NY 104 in Cambria	Stone Road	CR 31 in Lockport town	
CR 20	1.97	3.17	CR 60	Town Line Road on the Pendleton–Wheatfield town line	CR 13	
CR 23	0.41	0.66	CR 31	Plank Road in Lockport town	Lockport city line	
CR 24	6.67	10.73	NY 104	Hess Road in Newfane	NY 18	
CR 25	1.95	3.14	US 62	Niagara Road in Wheatfield	NY 429	
CR 26 (1)	1.16	1.87	CR 31	Main Street in Middleport	Middleport village line	CR 26 between CR 31 and the village line is co-designated with NY 271
CR 26 (2)	2.07	3.33	Middleport village line	Main Street in Hartland	NY 104	CR 26 between the village line and NY 104 is co-designated with NY 271
CR 31	2.10	3.38	CR 19 / CR 23	Old Niagara Road in Lockport town	CR 77	
CR 32 (1)	4.42	7.11	CR 6 in Wheatfield	Mapleton Road	NY 270 in Pendleton	
CR 32 (2)	0.11	0.18	CR 6	Mapleton Road Spur in Wheatfield	CR 32 (1)	
CR 35	3.57	5.75	CR 58	Riddle Road in Royalton	NY 93	
CR 36	9.66	15.55	NY 93 in Porter	Wilson–Youngstown Road	Wilson town line	
CR 40	3.34	5.38	CR 20	Beach Ridge Road in Pendleton	NY 270	
CR 44	2.10	3.38	CR 6	Comstock Road in Cambria	NY 31	
CR 45	0.59	0.95	Middleport	Main Street in Middleport	Mill Street	Former number; now part of CR 26.

== Routes 50–100 ==
Route	Length (mi)	Length (km)	From	Via	To	Notes
CR 52	5.56	8.95	Seneca Street in Wilson	Young Street and Wilson–Burt Road	NY 78 in Newfane	
CR 55	6.72	10.81	Griswold Street	Royalton Center Road in Royalton	NY 31	
CR 56	0.91	1.46	NY 104	Church Road in Cambria	NY 93	
CR 57	7.54	12.13	NY 104 in Lewiston	Porter Center Road	NY 18 in Porter	
CR 58	2.77	4.46	CR 12 in Lockport town	Tonawanda Creek Road	Erie County line	
CR 60	7.91	12.73	CR 20 / CR 67	Tonawanda Creek Road in Pendleton	NY 78	
CR 64	1.99	3.20	CR 902	Thrall Road in Cambria	CR 5	
CR 65	7.34	11.81	NY 104 in Hartland	Hosmer Road	NY 18 in Somerset	
CR 67	0.45	0.72	North Tonawanda city line	Lockport Avenue in Wheatfield	CR 20 / CR 60	
CR 76	1.25	2.01	CR 52	North Beebe Road in Wilson	NY 18	
CR 77	3.17	5.10	CR 31 in Lockport town	North Canal Road	NY 31 in Royalton	
CR 78	0.23	0.37	NY 18	West Lake Road in Wilson	CR 36	
CR 82	2.30	3.70	Niagara Falls city line	Packard Road in Niagara	CR 6	
CR 83	4.34	6.98	NY 93	Randall Road in Wilson	CR 36	
CR 85	1.43	2.30	CR 12	Raymond Road in Lockport town	NY 93	
CR 86	1.93	3.11	NY 18F / CR 907 in Youngstown	Church Street and Blairville Road	NY 18 in Porter	
CR 89	3.70	5.95	North Tonawanda city line	Nash Road in Wheatfield	CR 6	
CR 91	3.03	4.88	NY 78	East Avenue and Charlotteville Road in Newfane	CR 24	
CR 92	1.24	2.00	Lockport city line	Lincoln Avenue	NY 954M	
CR 93	0.37	0.60	US 62	Crescent Drive in Wheatfield	CR 20	
CR 96 (1)	7.19	11.57	Erie County line	Bear Ridge Road	Lockport city line	
CR 96 (2)	0.18	0.29	Erie County line	Picard Bridge Approach	CR 96 (1)	

== Routes 100–150 ==
Route	Length (mi)	Length (km)	From	Via	To	Notes
CR 104	5.80	9.33	NY 425 in Wilson	Ide Road	NY 78 in Newfane	
CR 105	2.35	3.78	NY 78	Hatter Road in Newfane	CR 24	
CR 108	10.24	16.48	New York Barge Canal in Royalton	Hartland Road	NY 18 in Somerset	Segment between NY 104 and CR 10 was designated as NY 359 from 1930 to the early 1940s.
CR 109	5.46	8.79	NY 18	Balmer Road in Porter	CR 17	
CR 110	1.60	2.57	Erie County line	Block Church Road in Royalton	NY 93	
CR 111	6.52	10.49	NY 104 in Cambria	Beebe Road	CR 52	
CR 112	2.23	3.59	CR 58	Tonawanda Creek Road in Royalton	CR 110	
CR 113	1.81	2.91	NY 104	Johnson Creek Road in Hartland	Bradley Road	
CR 114	0.18	0.29	NY 93	Towline Road Spur in Lockport town	CR 902	
CR 115	0.72	1.16	Niagara Falls city line	Fashion Outlet Boulevard in Niagara	NY 265	
CR 116	4.63	7.45	CR 140 in Lewiston town	Lower Mountain Road	NY 425 in Cambria	
CR 117	3.48	5.60	NY 78	Tonawanda Creek Road in Lockport town	CR 12	
CR 118	2.93	4.72	NY 31 in Royalton	Orangeport Road	NY 104 in Hartland	
CR 120 (1)	2.42	3.89	CR 5	Sunset Drive in Lockport town	NY 104	
CR 120 (2)	0.03	0.05	CR 120 (1)	Sunset Drive in Lockport town	NY 5	
CR 121	1.85	2.98	NY 270	Feigle Road in Pendleton	CR 130	
CR 122 (1)	2.02	3.25	NY 93	Wolcottsville Road in Royalton	Griswold Street	
CR 122 (2)	0.26	0.42	CR 122 (1)	Old Wolcottsville Road in Royalton	CR 122 (1)	
CR 123	0.80	1.29	CR 96 in Pendleton	Robinson Road	NY 93 in Lockport town	Formerly continued east to CR 14
CR 125	0.60	0.97	Gothic Hill Road	Niagara Street in Lockport town	CR 120	
CR 126	0.44	0.71	Wilson town line	Young Street in Wilson village	Seneca Street	
CR 127	0.91	1.46	CR 19	Johnson Road in Lockport town	NY 104	
CR 128	0.28	0.45	CR 12	Plank Road in Lockport town	CR 58	
CR 129	1.54	2.48	CR 25	Walmore Road in Wheatfield	CR 6	
CR 130	3.54	5.70	Erie County line	East Canal Road in Pendleton	CR 123	
CR 131	9.84	15.84	NY 31 in Royalton	Carmen Road	NY 18 in Somerset	
CR 133	3.47	5.58	CR 14 / CR 123 in Lockport town	Dysinger Road	NY 93 (now CR 142)	Former number; now part of NY 93
CR 135	4.43	7.13	NY 148 / CR 15 in Somerset	Hart–Somerset Road	NY 269 in Hartland	
CR 136	0.29	0.47	NY 93	Bunkerhill Road in Royalton	CR 10	
CR 137	4.33	6.97	NY 104	Ewings Road in Newfane	NY 78	
CR 138	0.25	0.40	CR 907	Jackson Street in Youngstown	Porter town line	Entire length concurrent with NY 18F
CR 140	0.30	0.48	CR 116	Dickersonville Road in Lewiston	NY 104	
CR 141	0.16	0.26	CR 67	Connecting Boulevard in Wheatfield	US 62	
CR 142	3.47	5.58	Lockport city line	Akron Road	NY 93 in Royalton	Formerly part of NY 93
CR 143	0.80	1.29	NY 271 in Middleport	State Street	Orleans county line	Entire length concurrent with NY 31E

== Routes 902–907 ==
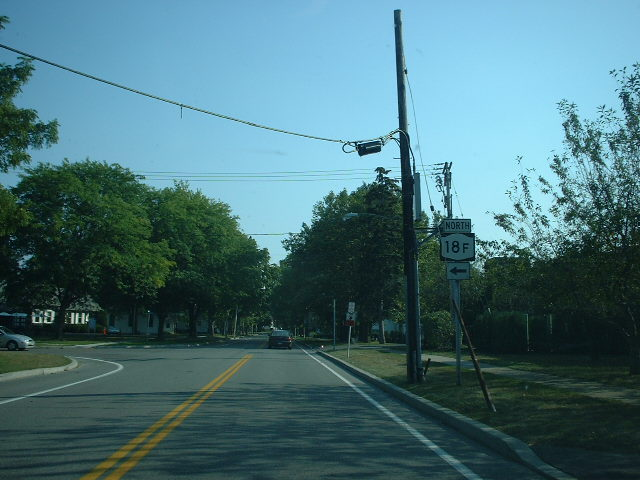
The northern terminus of CR 907, a county-maintained section of NY 18F, in Youngstown

There are four county highways with designations above 900 in the county road system. None of these designations are signed as Niagara County does not sign their highways, and thus are better known by their accompanying road name. The locations of the four routes are scattered across the county.

Three of the four routes—CR 902 (Lower Mountain Road in the town of Cambria), CR 903 (Hinman Road in the town of Lockport), and CR 905 (Griswold Road in the town of Royalton)—do not overlap other routes. The fourth, CR 907, is a designation for a 5-mile (8.0 km) long county-maintained portion of NY 18F alongside the Niagara River. All four highways were assigned by 1996 and are marked on New York State Department of Transportation digital raster quadrangles.

CR 907 is the highest three-digit county route in terms of designation in the state of New York. Overall, it is the second-highest numbered county route in the state; only CR 1345 in the Saratoga County town of Mechanicville has a higher designation.

Route	Length (mi)	Length (km)	From	Via	To	Notes
CR 902	4.05	6.52	NY 425 in Cambria	Lower Mountain Road	Gothic Hill Road in Lockport town	Former alignment of NY 93
CR 903	1.66	2.67	NY 270	Hinman Road in Lockport town	Lockport city line	
CR 905	5.00	8.05	NY 77	Griswold Street in Royalton	NY 31	
CR 907	6.02	9.69	Center Street in Lewiston village	Main Street	Fort Niagara State Park	Entire length concurrent with NY 18F

== See also ==
- County routes in New York
- Highways in Niagara County, New York
