= United States Post Office (Middleport, New York) =

- U.S. Post Office
- U.S. National Register of Historic Places
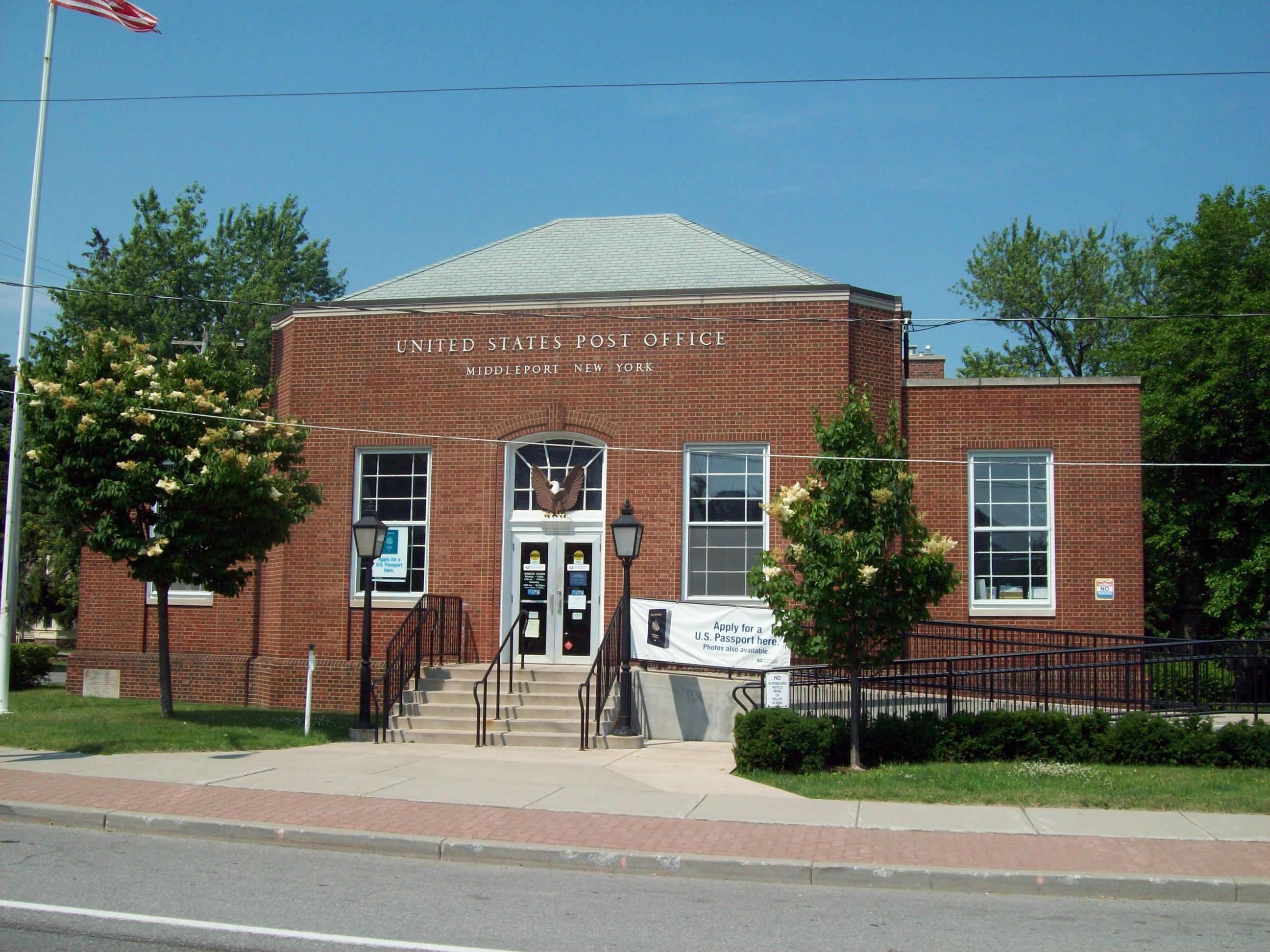
- East elevation, 2009

- Location within New York Location within the United States
- Location: Middleport, New York
- Nearest city: Lockport
- Coordinates: 43°12′40″N 78°28′36″W
- Area: less than one acre
- Built: 1940
- Architect: Louis Simon; Marianne Appel
- Architectural style: Colonial Revival
- MPS: US Post Offices in New York State, 1858-1943, TR
- NRHP reference No.: 88002353
- Added to NRHP: May 11, 1989

The U.S. Post Office in Middleport, New York, is located at Main (state highways 31E and 271) and Church streets. It is a brick building erected in 1940, serving the 14105 ZIP Code, which covers the village of Middleport and surrounding areas of the towns of Hartland and Royalton.

It is one of only three in the state using that design, a modernist form with Colonial Revival details. Inside is a mural commissioned by the Treasury Department. In 1989 it was listed on the National Register of Historic Places, the only listing currently in Middleport, as part of a large group of present and former post offices in the state, including three others in Niagara County.

== Building ==
The post office is located on the northwest corner of the intersection, near the south end of Middleport's small downtown section, roughly 300 feet (90 m) south of the canal crossing. On the opposite corner is a cobblestone church from the 1840s; across Main is an early 20th-century bank building and 19th-century house. The other buildings in the area are houses from that period as well. The terrain is level, with the post office set back slightly from the street amid a landscaped area of ornamental shrubs and trees. A low hedge runs along the Church Street side. A parking lot is in the rear.

The building itself is a one-story steel frame building on a raised foundation of poured concretesided in brick laid in English bond. The five-bay front facade is distinguished by a projecting three-bay central pavilion with a beveled-cornered hipped roof covered in slate. All other roofs are flat. Narrow stone coping runs around the entire building at the roofline. A four-bay rear projection contains the loading dock, with wood fascia and cornice.

The central pavilion has angled corners. Its east (front) facade has a centrally located segmental arch entrance with brick surround, lintel and keystone. A carved metal eagle surmounts the door. "UNITED STATES POST OFFICE" is written in bronze letters across the top of the facade, with "MIDDLEPORT NEW YORK" in smaller letters below. Three granite steps lead up to the entrance from the sidewalk; a wheelchair ramp runs from the top to the north along the facade. It is flanked by the original iron railings and lanterns, atop fluted posts.

Modern aluminum and glass doors open into a small wooden vestibule. The small lobby behind it takes up the front of the main section and the north wing. It is floored in terrazzo. Above it is white marble wainscoting trimmed in oak. The tables are shaped to fit the angled corners. Most furnishings are original, with some alterations made to the teller grilles and lock boxes along with the installation of modern lighting. Above the door to the postmaster's office in the southeast of the building is Rural Highway, a mural by Marianne Appel depicting a contemporary farm scene.

== History ==
Middleport's first post office was established in the store of James Northam, its first merchant, around the time the Erie Canal was completed through the area in 1825. For the rest of the century it remained in various leased buildings on Main Street as the settlement grew, changed its name from Tea-Pot Hollow to Middleport and incorporated as a village.

In 1939, as part of relief efforts during the Great Depression, Congress authorized the construction of a post office building in the village, one of the last of over 200 in the state built in the 1930s. The government acquired the present site for $8,950 ($207,000 in contemporary dollars) and demolished the village's trolley stop, a church social hall and house to make way for the new building. In May 1940 a Takoma Park, Maryland, contractor began construction. The building was opened in January 1941, one of the last new post offices to be completed before Congress began diverting resources to preparing for war.

Louis Simon, the last Supervising Architect of the Treasury Department, used the Colonial Revival style as he had come to do for new post offices in small towns, part of the government's increasing standardization of its architecture. As with many of the other Colonial Revival post offices in New York, Middleport's was part of a group employing the same design with slight variations dictated by the site.

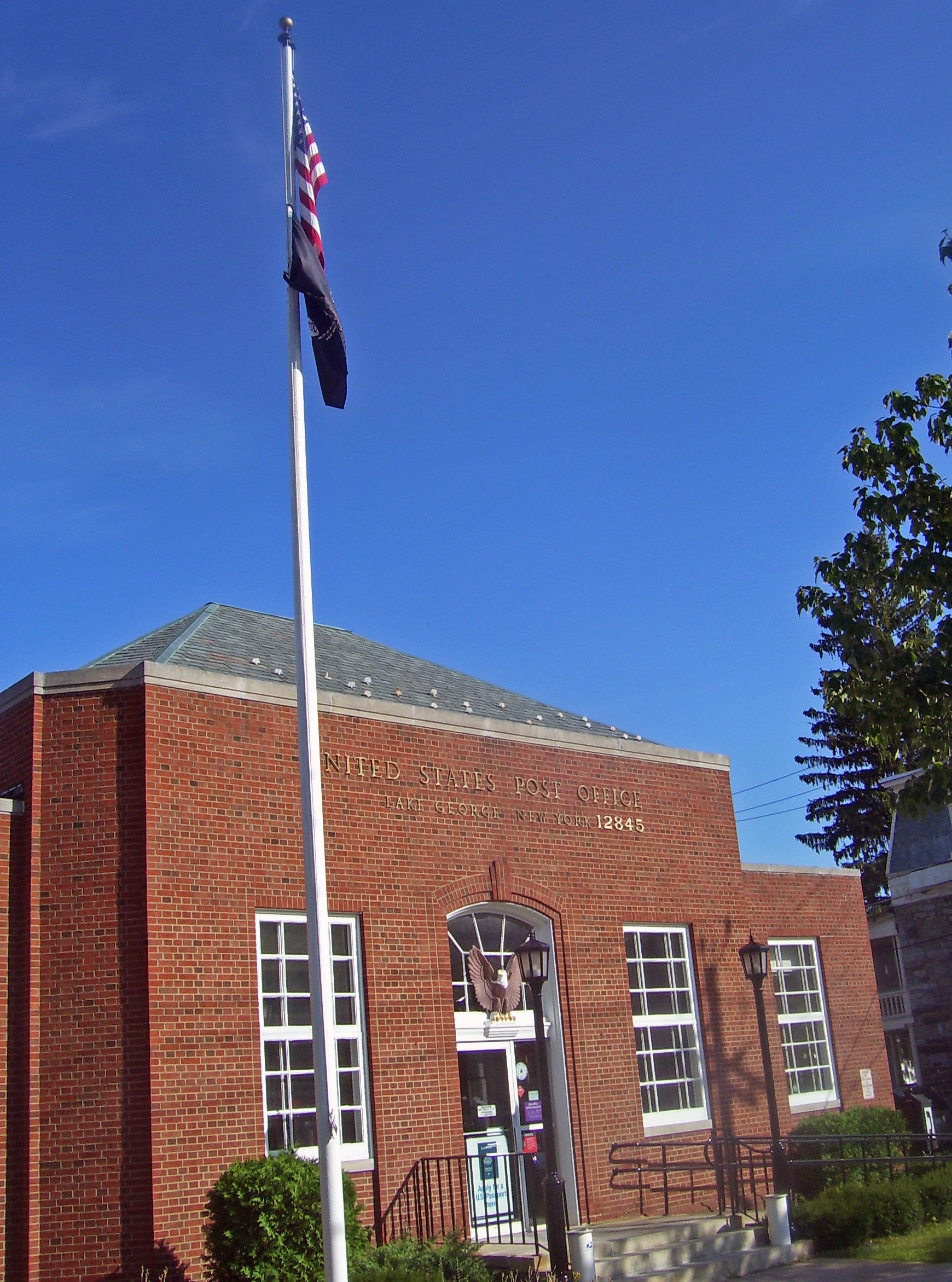
The Lake George post office

In this case, two others—Frankfort and Lake George—used the same Georgian basic form with design elements more specifically associated with the contemporary Moderne and Art Deco styles, such as the angled corners, asymmetrical window panes and large expanses of brick above the windows. Middleport's differs from Lake George's only in the width of its front steps and the shape and decor of the lobby. He also used some design elements more specifically associated with the contemporary Moderne and Art Deco styles, such as the angled corners, asymmetrical window panes and large expanses of brick above the windows. Those buildings and Simon's similar Westhampton Beach post office on Long Island were all influenced by the Rockville Centre post office designed in 1937 by William Dewey Foster, which first combined the Colonial Revival form with modernism.

Marianne Appel, a New York City-born artist, won the Treasury's Fine Arts Section's competition to paint the mural. It was added shortly after the opening. Her Depression-era murals have been described as having "transcend[ed] in design and technique the ordinary painting of the 1930s". There have been few changes to the building since.

== See also ==
- National Register of Historic Places listings in Niagara County, New York
