= Eugene Butler (serial killer) =

American serial killer (c. 1849 - 1913)

- Born: c. 1849; Royalton, New York, U.S.
- Died: October 22, 1913 (aged 63–64); North Dakota State Hospital, Jamestown, North Dakota, U.S.
- Other names: The Great Plains Butcher; The Midnight Rider
- Status: Deceased
- Conviction: Died before his crimes were discovered

Details
- Victims: 6
- Span of crimes: 1900–1906
- Country: United States
- State: North Dakota

Eugene Butler (c. 1849 – October 22, 1913) was an American serial killer who murdered six teenage boys at his residence in Niagara, North Dakota, from 1900 to 1906. The bodies of his victims were found in 1915, two years after Butler had died in an insane asylum.

== Biography ==
=== Early life and move to North Dakota ===
Eugene Butler was born in Royalton, New York, near Buffalo, circa 1849, one of three sons born to Ephraim and Rebecca (née Pearson) Butler. Upon moving to the Dakota Territory around 1882, Butler purchased a 480-acre farm in the city of Niagara (in present-day North Dakota). He maintained the property on his own, never married and lived as a recluse, avoiding contacts with neighbors and only going out for business purposes in nearby Larimore. Butler hired farmhands to maintain his land during the summer months.

=== Insanity, asylum and death ===
Since moving to Niagara, Butler began showing signs of mental illness. He suffered from hallucinations, claimed that invisible people were chasing him, and around 1906 he began riding on horseback at nighttime, screaming at the top of his lungs and scaring other residents. Due to being considered a public nuisance, Butler was admitted to the North Dakota State Hospital in Jamestown under the supervision of Dr. W. M. Hotchkiss.

During his confinement at the asylum, Butler expressed his fears towards the supposed invisible figures and having his picture taken, believing that the camera would suck out his soul. Despite his condition, he showed no violent or homicidal tendencies. According to Dr. A. W. Guest, Butler was a man of small stature, very gallant and fond of attending the hospital dances, even falling desperately in love with one of the nurses. On October 22, 1913, Butler died while imprisoned in the asylum. His remains were shipped to Middleport, New York, where he would be buried by relatives.

=== Discovery of murders ===
After Butler's death, his estate was divided between his living relatives with the help of attorney W. E. Houpt. In 1915, two years after Butler's death, workmen were sent to excavate the farm with the purpose of renovating it. One workman, Leo Verbulehn, was digging a cellar under the house when he discovered human skeletons buried close to the foundation. All of them had had their skulls crushed, most likely by a sharp instrument, and at least two had had their legs broken. Initially, there was a theory that five of the remains belonged to a family consisting of two women, probably housekeepers, and their children. Nobody in the neighborhood, however, recalled a family that had ever gone missing in the county. The possibility of the family's being Butler's relatives was also ruled out, as he must have murdered them immediately upon entering the premises.

Police later revealed that the skeletons all belonged to young men, one of them being a boy aged between 15 and 18 and another who had a crooked nose. Authorities could not identify the individuals and suggested that they were vagrants employed as farmhands by Butler, which would explain why nobody had noted their disappearances. It is suspected that Butler had probably murdered the men because he thought they were going to steal money from his house, a lot of which he had lying about. It was also noted that there were no traces of clothes of any kind, suggesting that the bodies had been buried nude and that Butler had burned the clothes.

In order to dispose of the bodies, Butler had built a trapdoor, removing three bottom stones from the house foundation. He then had used black dirt and red clay subsoil in order to cover up the burial place of the bodies.

Following the discovery, many onlookers visited the farm in order to observe the crime scene. The deputies deposited the victims' aging bones in a box, which was then transported to the office of Sheriff Art Turner. Later, it was discovered that some of the bones were stolen, most likely by souvenir hunters.

=== John Urbanski inquiry ===
A possible lead to the identification of at least one of the victims was the inquiry of Leo Urbanski, a wealthy farmer residing in Long Prairie, Minnesota. At Leo's request, attorney C. B. DeLaurier wrote to State Attorney O. B. Burtness, claiming that one of the victims might be his brother, John Urbanski. John, who also went by the name John Miller, disappeared near Niagara in 1902. Before his sudden vanishing, he had written a letter to his brother, stating that he was working for a bachelor in the city. The letter's postmark indicated it had been mailed from Larimore, the town where Butler conducted business.

== Solving the mystery ==
To this day, Butler's victims remain unidentified. According to forensic anthropologist Phoebe Stubblefield, modern DNA techniques could be used to identify the remains if they are discovered by authorities or surrendered by those who stole them.

In 2016, the Grand Forks County Sheriff's Department reached out to the public in an effort to find new leads, as the old case records were either destroyed or lost.

== See also ==
- List of serial killers in the United States

== Bibliography and further reading ==
- Newton, Michael (1992). Serial Slaughter: What's Behind America's Murder Epidemic?. Loompanics. ISBN 978-1-55950-078-4.
- Newton, Michael (2006). The Encyclopedia of Serial Killers. Infobase. ISBN 978-0-8160-6987-3.
- Ramsland, Katherine (2013). The Human Predator: A Historical Chronicle of Serial Murder and Forensic Investigation. Berkley true crime. Penguin Group. ISBN 978-1-101-61905-6.
- Schechter, Harold (September 16, 2025). 50 States of Murder: An Atlas of American Crime. Workman Publishing Company. ISBN 978-1-5235-2416-7.
- Vronsky, Peter (August 14, 2018). Sons of Cain: A History of Serial Killers from the Stone Age to the Present. Penguin Group. ISBN 978-0-425-27697-6.
