= Eugene Butler =

Eugene Butler may refer to:

- Eugene Butler (serial killer) (1849–1913), American serial killer
- Eugene Joseph Butler (1900–1981), Irish-born Spiritan priest and bishop in Africa
- Eugene Butler, actor in the Baby Burlesks film series
