= Orangeport, New York =

Hamlet in New York, United States

Coordinates: 43°11′54″N 78°35′45″W

Orangeport is a hamlet in the town of Royalton in Niagara County, New York, United States.
