= Dysinger, New York =

Hamlet in Royalton, New York, U.S.

Coordinates: 43°08′02″N 78°34′27″W

Dysinger is a hamlet in the town of Royalton in Niagara County, New York, United States.
