= United States Post Office (Lake George, New York) =

- U.S. Post Office
- U.S. National Register of Historic Places
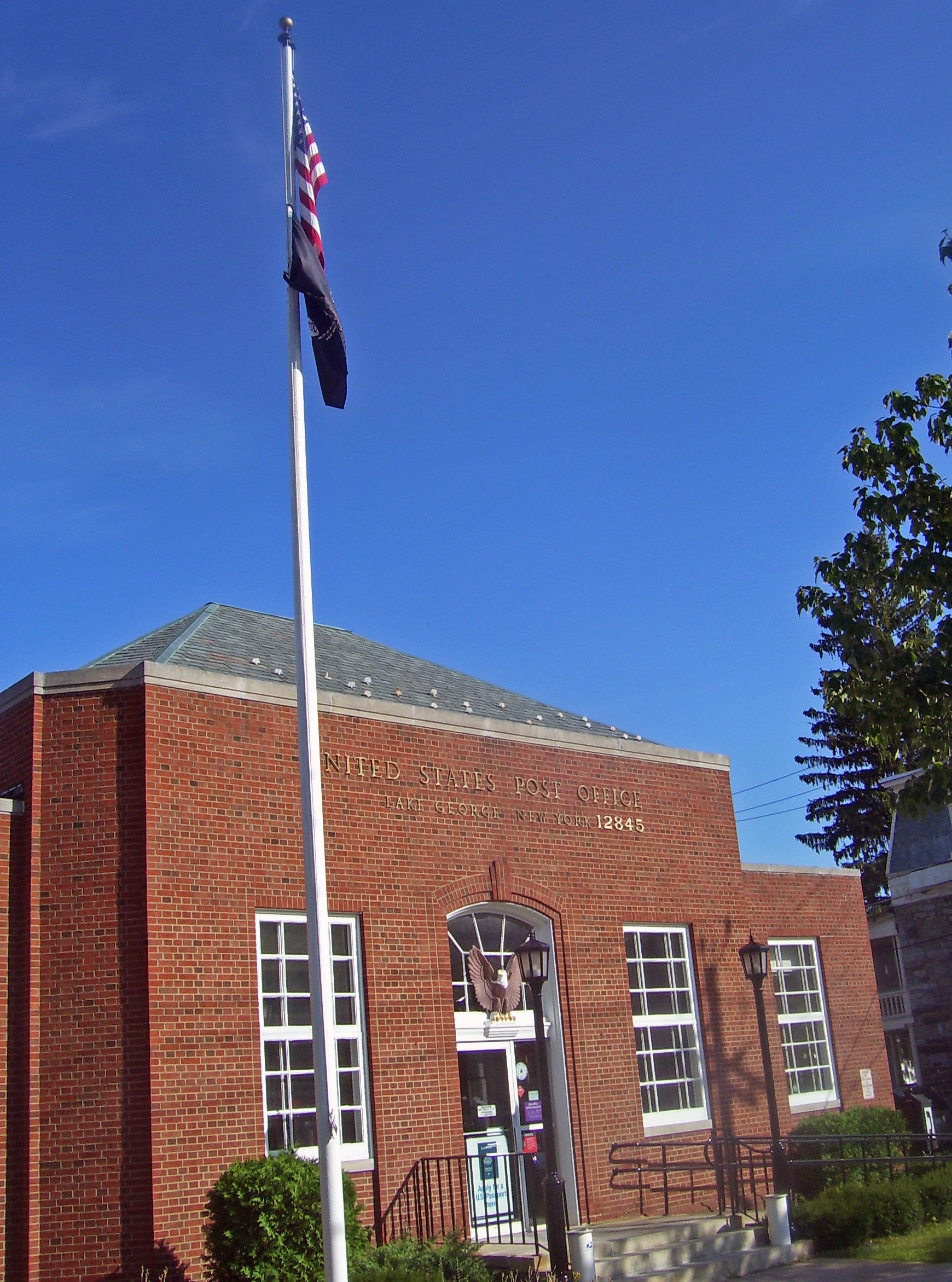
- West elevation, 2008

- Location within New York Location within the United States
- Location: 180 Canada St., Lake George, New York
- Coordinates: 43°25′25″N 73°42′47″W
- Built: 1940
- Architect: Louis Simon
- Architectural style: Colonial Revival
- MPS: U.S. Post Offices in New York State, 1858–1943, TR
- NRHP reference No.: 88002338
- Added to NRHP: 1989

The U.S. Post Office in Lake George, New York, United States, is located at the corner of Canada Street (US 9/NY 9N) and Kurosaka Lane (formerly James Street). It is a small brick building constructed just before World War II. It serves the area the village of Lake George, the surrounding town and those areas of Queensbury which comprise the 12845 ZIP Code.

The building was designed by Treasury Department Supervising Architect Louis A. Simon in a restrained Colonial Revival architectural style with some modernist touches. Later a mural of the Lake George area was added to the lobby. In 1989, the building was listed on the National Register of Historic Places, the only post office in Warren County so recognized.

== Building ==
The post office is located at the west end of a narrow lot that slopes gently down toward the shore of the lake. It is on the northeast corner of the intersection. The neighborhood is commercial, with the surrounding structures used for that purpose. A parking lot is located to the east of the post office, accessible from Kurosaka. The building is set back generously from the street, with some landscaping and hedges located in front.

It is a one-story steel frame building on a raised foundation of poured concrete and sided in brick laid in English bond. The five-bay front facade is distinguished by a projecting three-bay central pavilion with a beveled-cornered hipped roof covered in slate. All other roofs are flat. Narrow stone coping runs around the entire building at the roofline. A four-bay rear projection contains the loading dock.

The central pavilion has angled corners. Its front facade has a centrally located segmental arch entrance with brick surround, lintel and keystone. A carved metal eagle surmounts the door. "UNITED STATES POST OFFICE" is written in bronze letters across the top of the facade, with "LAKE GEORGE NEW YORK 12845" in smaller letters below. Three granite steps lead up to the entrance from the sidewalk; a wheelchair ramp runs from the top to the south along the facade. It is flanked by the original iron railings and lanterns, atop fluted posts.

Inside, the lobby is L-shaped. It is floored in terrazzo, with a veined Vermont marble dado running around the room to counter level. Above it is wood panelling with bulletin boards. The tables and counters are original. Judson Smith's mural is painted on canvas above the entrance to the postmaster's office.

== History ==
Lake George has had a post office since 1825, 12 years after it was designated the seat of the newly created county, known as Caldwell after a major landowner of the time. For most of the 19th century the Post Office rented space in other buildings, as the village grew from being an economic center of the southeastern Adirondacks and stop on the major trade route to Canada to a popular summer colony.

In 1938 Congress appropriated $75,000 ($1.72 million in contemporary dollars) for the current post office as part of an ongoing relief effort during the Great Depression. The land was acquired and construction began the next year. The new post office was opened for business early in 1941.

Louis Simon, the supervising architect at the Treasury Department, used the Colonial Revival style, standard for most post offices in small communities across the country at that time. Notable features of that style in the Lake George post office are the brick facing, eagle ornament and symmetrical fenestration. The projecting central pavilion with flanking bays is also a specifically Georgian touch.

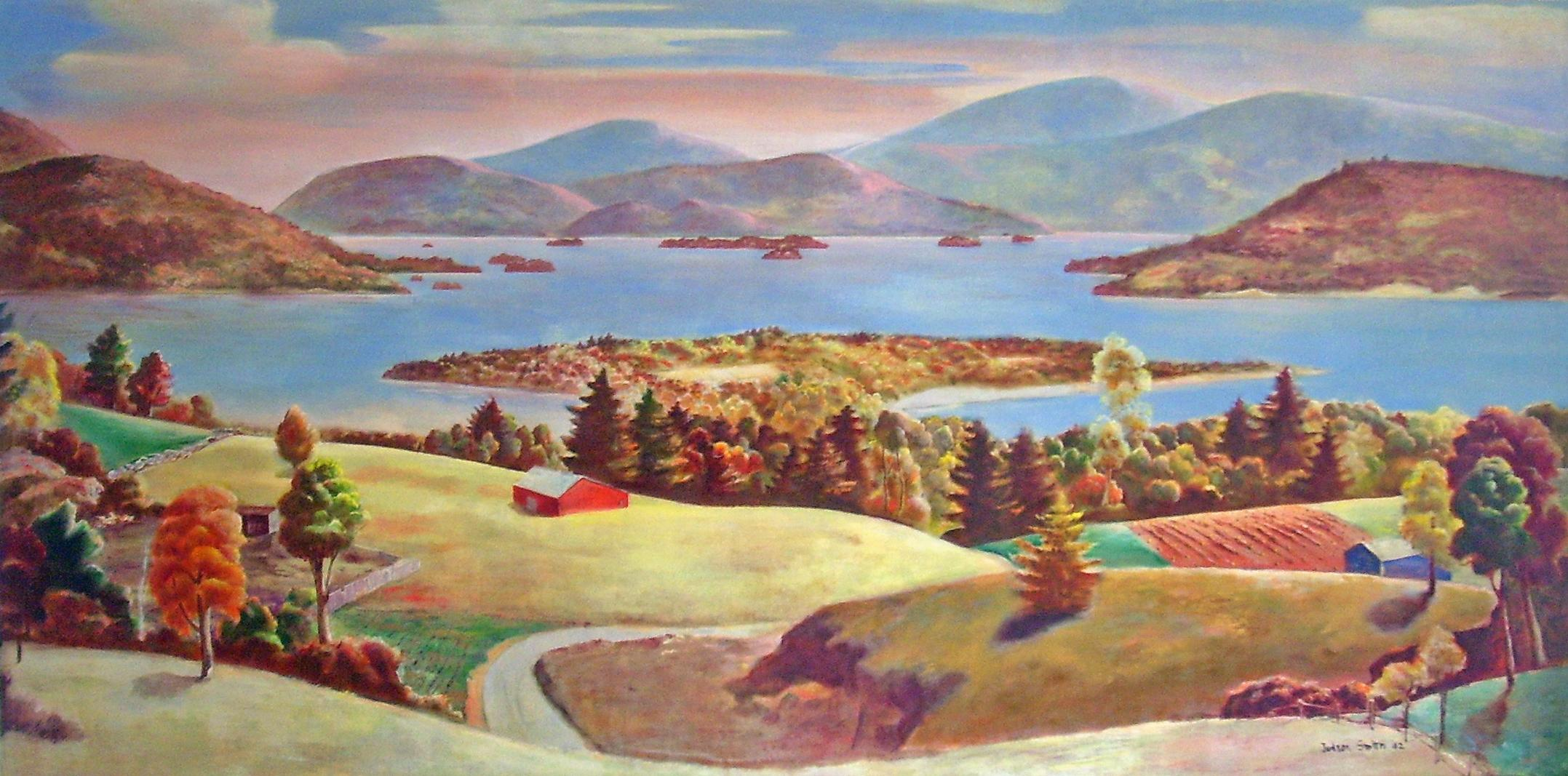
Smith's mural of Lake George

He also used some design elements more specifically associated with the contemporary Moderne and Art Deco styles, such as the angled corners, asymmetrical window panes and large expanses of brick above the windows. Only two other post offices in the state, at Frankfort and Middleport, built around the same time, use the same design. The Westhampton Beach post office on Long Island, also built in 1940, is also very similar. All of them show the influence of another Long Island post office, in Rockville Centre, built in 1937.

Judson Smith's mural was hung in 1942. Other than the installation of fluorescent lighting in the lobby in 1973, there have been no significant changes to the building since then.

== See also ==
- National Register of Historic Places listings in Warren County, New York
