= Terrys Corners, New York =

Hamlet in New York, United States

Coordinates: 43°10′27″N 78°36′01″W

Terrys Corners is a hamlet in the town of Royalton in Niagara County, New York, United States.
