= Royalton Center, New York =

Hamlet in New York, United States

Coordinates: 43°09′49″N 78°32′18″W

Royalton Center is a hamlet in the town of Royalton in Niagara County, New York, United States.
