= McNalls, New York =

Hamlet in New York, United States

Coordinates: 43°09′56″N 78°34′28″W

McNalls, or McNalls Corners, is a hamlet in the town of Royalton in Niagara County, New York, United States.
