= Wolcottsville, New York =

Hamlet in New York, United States

Coordinates: 43°06′41″N 78°31′05″W

Wolcottsville is a hamlet in the town of Royalton in Niagara County, New York, United States.

== Geography ==
Wolcottsville is located on the western side of the Tonawanda Wildlife Management Area. Its main street is Wolcottsville Road. Note that Wolcottsburg is a different hamlet located to the south in Erie County, New York.
