= New York State Route 271 =

State highway in Niagara County, New York, US

New York State Route 271
- Map of Niagara County in western New York with NY 271 highlighted in red

Route information
- Maintained by NYSDOT and Niagara County
- Length: 3.21 mi (5.17 km)
- Existed: 1930–present

Major junctions
- South end: NY 31 / NY 31E in Middleport
- North end: NY 104 in Hartland

Location
- Country: United States
- State: New York
- Counties: Niagara

Highway system
- New York Highways; Interstate; US; State; Reference; Parkways
← NY 270	→ NY 272

New York State Route 271 (NY 271) is a 3.21-mile (5.17 km) north–south state highway in eastern Niagara County, New York, in the United States. It primarily serves as Middleport's Main Street, connecting NY 31 in the south to NY 104 in the north. The southernmost portion of NY 271 is concurrent with NY 31E. At State Street, NY 31E splits off to follow the Erie Canal while NY 271 continues north on Main Street. North of Middleport, NY 271 traverses an area of the county dominated by farmland. NY 271 originally extended as far south as NY 93 when it was assigned as part of the 1930 renumbering of state highways in New York; however, it was truncated to Middleport in the early 1940s.

== Route description ==
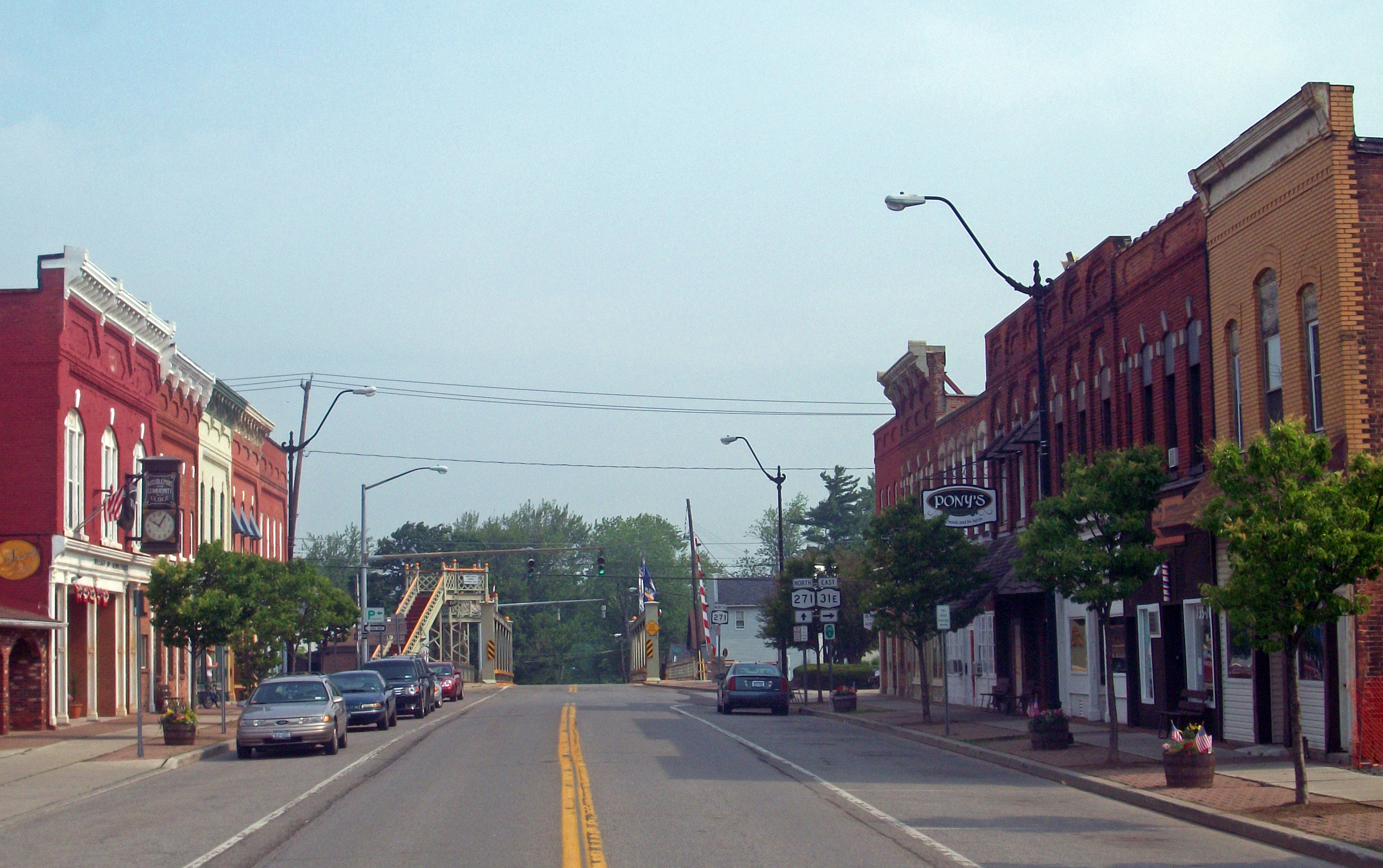
Looking north along Main Street (NY 31E and NY 271) in Middleport. NY 31E leaves NY 271 in the background at State Street.

NY 271 begins concurrent with NY 31E at an intersection with NY 31 in the village of Middleport. The routes head north on Main Street, passing two large residential blocks and the Middleport post office before entering the village's central business district. Here, NY 31E leaves NY 271 at State Street to head east toward Medina while NY 271 continues north across the Erie Canal to the northern outskirts of the village. At Mill Street, the first street that NY 271 meets after crossing the canal, ownership and maintenance of the route shifts from the New York State Department of Transportation (NYSDOT) to Niagara County. As the route leaves Middleport for the town of Hartland, the homes become more spread out as the residential areas give way to open farmland. Eventually, the homes completely give way to farmland, and NY 271 serves only a small handful of farms before it ends at a junction with NY 104 (Ridge Road) about 3 miles (5 km) north of Middleport.

== History ==
NY 271 was assigned as part of the 1930 renumbering of state highways in New York. It initially began at an intersection with NY 93 in southern Royalton and followed Wolcottsville Road, Griswold Street, and Griswold Road north to NY 3 (modern NY 31) in Middleport. The route joined NY 3 here, following it northeast through the village on Telegraph Road and Main Street. NY 3 left NY 271 at State Street (modern NY 31E), while NY 271 split from Main Street at Mill Street to follow the latter west out of Middleport. The highway turned one final time at Carmen Road, following it north to a junction with Ridge Road (then NY 31 and now NY 104), where NY 271 ended. NY 271 was truncated on its southern end to Telegraph Road in Middleport in the early 1940s.

The portion of NY 271 north of Mill Street was rerouted in the mid-1970s to continue north on North Main Street and Stone Road to NY 104. On September 1, 1990, ownership and maintenance of this section of NY 271 was transferred from the state of New York to Niagara County as part of a highway maintenance swap between the two levels of government. NY 271 is now maintained by Niagara County as County Route 45 (CR 45) from Mill Street to the Middleport village line and CR 26 from the Middleport village line to NY 104. Most of NY 271's former routing south of Middleport is also maintained by Niagara County as CR 122 (Wolcottville Road) and as CR 905 (Griswold Road north of NY 77). The piece of NY 271's old routing along Carmen Road is part of CR 131 in Hartland and part of CR 139 in Royalton.

== Major intersections ==
The entire route is in Niagara County.

Location	mi	km	Destinations	Notes
Middleport	0.00	0.00	NY 31 / NY 31E east – Lockport, Niagara Falls	Southern terminus; southern terminus of NY 31E / NY 271 overlap; western terminus of NY 31E
Middleport	0.51	0.82	NY 31E east	Northern terminus of NY 31E / NY 271 overlap
Hartland	3.21	5.17	NY 104	Northern terminus; hamlet of Jeddo
1.000 mi = 1.609 km; 1.000 km = 0.621 mi: Concurrency terminus

== See also ==
- List of county routes in Niagara County, New York (26–50)
