= New York State Route 31E =

State highway in western New York, US

New York State Route 31E
- Map of Niagara and Orleans counties with NY 31E highlighted in red

Route information
- Auxiliary route of NY 31
- Maintained by NYSDOT, Niagara County, and the village of Medina
- Length: 5.29 mi (8.51 km)
- Existed: January 1, 1949–present

Major junctions
- West end: NY 31 / NY 271 in Middleport
- East end: NY 31 / NY 63 in Medina

Location
- Country: United States
- State: New York
- Counties: Niagara, Orleans

Highway system
- New York Highways; Interstate; US; State; Reference; Parkways
← NY 31D	→ NY 31F

New York State Route 31E (NY 31E) is a 5.29-mile (8.51 km) state highway located in western New York in the United States. It serves as a northerly alternate route of NY 31 between the village of Middleport in eastern Niagara County and the nearby village of Medina in Orleans County. NY 31E connects to NY 31 at each end by way of a short overlap with NY 271 in Middleport. Most of NY 31E parallels the Erie Canal, and parts of the route run adjacent to the waterway. Outside of the two villages at each end, NY 31E traverses mostly rural areas of the towns of Royalton and Ridgeway.

The origins of the route date back to 1914 when its routing was included as part of a spur route of Route 30, a cross-state, unsigned legislative route. The spur route was eliminated in 1921, and the road went unnumbered until 1930 renumbering of state highways in New York when it became part of NY 3. Most of NY 3 west of Rochester was replaced by NY 31 in the mid-1930s, and NY 31 was realigned onto its present, more southerly alignment between Middleport and Medina in 1949. Its former canalside alignment became NY 31E at this time. Most of NY 31E is maintained by the New York State Department of Transportation (NYSDOT); however, two sections in Niagara County and Medina are locally maintained.

== Route description ==
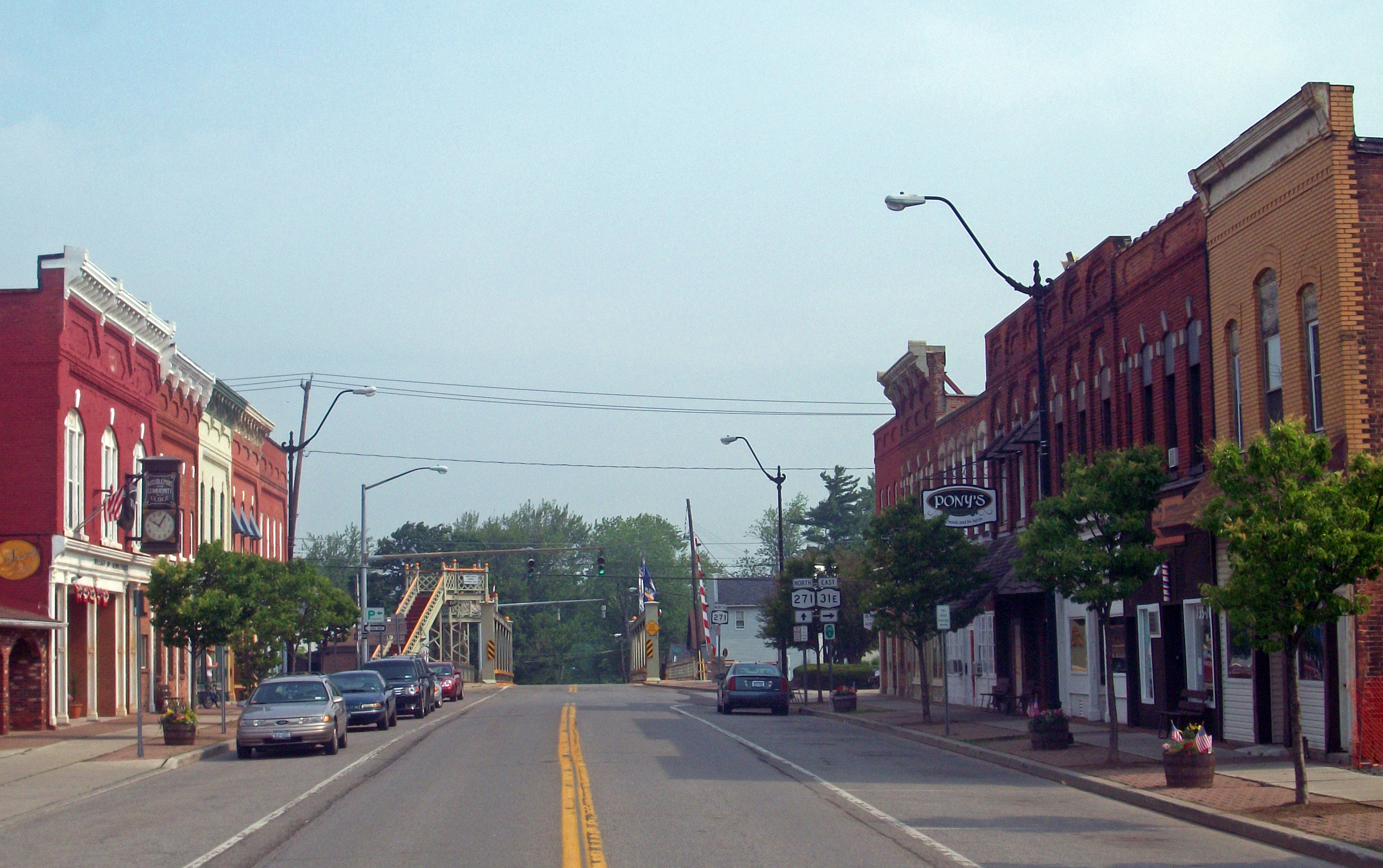
Looking north along Main Street (NY 31E and NY 271) in Middleport. NY 31E leaves NY 271 in the background at State Street.

NY 31E begins at an intersection with NY 31 in the village of Middleport in eastern Niagara County. The route heads north as Main Street, overlapping with NY 271 (which also begins at NY 31) through the mostly residential village. Just south of the Erie Canal, NY 31E and NY 271 enter Middleport's small business district, centered on the junction of Main and State Streets. Here, NY 31E and NY 271 split, with NY 31E following State Street eastward through the eastern portion of the community. Along this stretch, the route serves Royalton–Hartland High School and Royalton-Hartland Middle School before exiting Middleport and entering a slightly more open area of the town of Royalton. NY 31E runs past undeveloped land to the north and a smattering of homes to the south on its way into the Orleans County town of Ridgeway.

East of the county line, NY 31E becomes Telegraph Road and continues across increasingly less developed areas of Ridgeway. The Erie Canal is visible from most of this section of NY 31E, and about 1 mile (1.6 km) of the highway runs directly alongside the waterway, which curves several times between Middleport and Medina. The two separate at the small hamlet of Shelby Basin, where the route follows a more southerly alignment into a more populated area. Not far to the east is the village of Medina, where NY 31E changes names to West Center Street. The route heads east across the residential western half of the village, passing Prospect Avenue (former NY 63) on its way into Medina's business district. NY 31E passes the village's post office and enter the Main Street Historic District, where NY 31E terminates at NY 31 and NY 63.

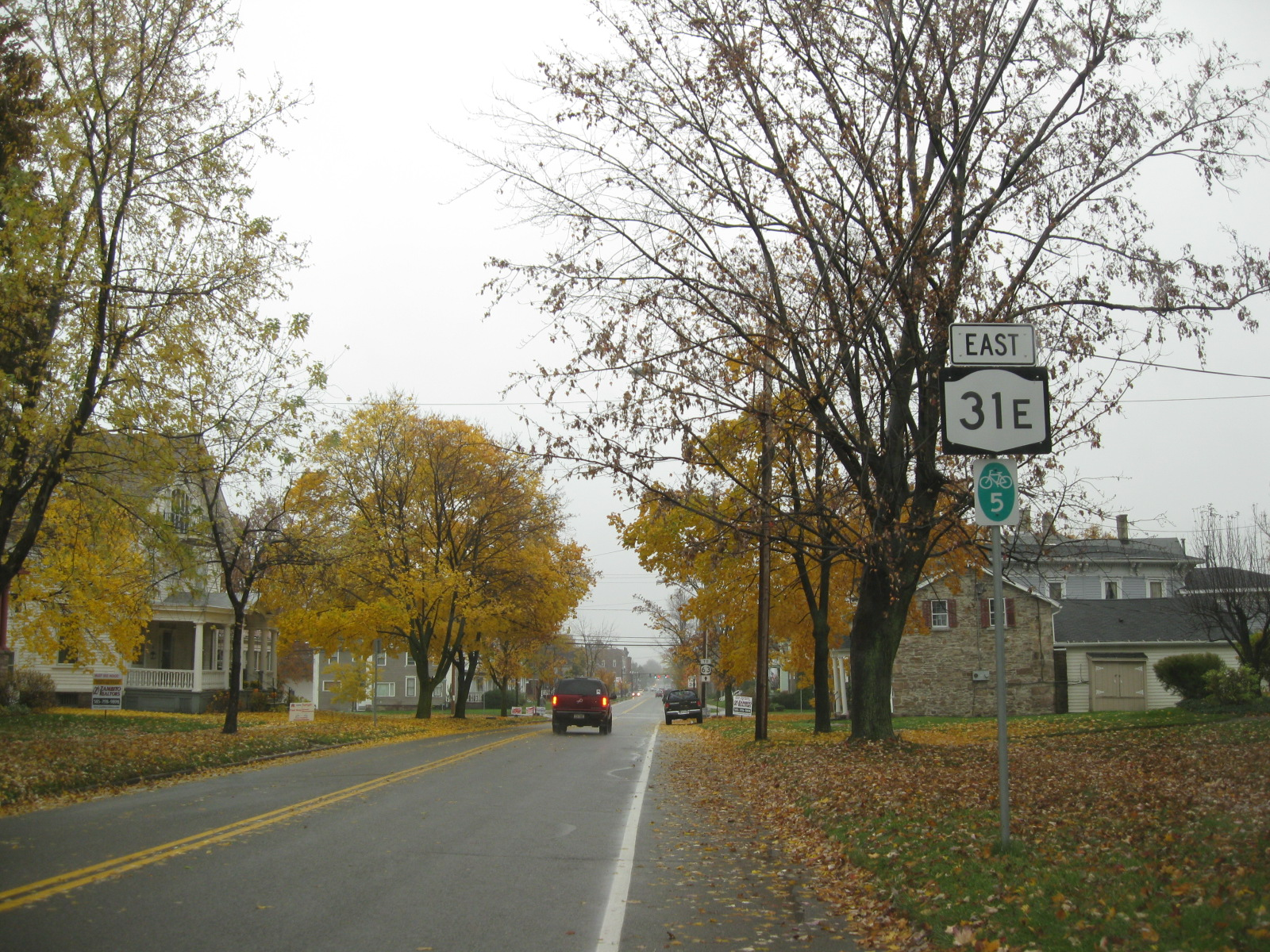
NY 31E eastbound in Medina

Maintenance along the route varies by location. From the Niagara–Orleans county line to the Medina village line, NY 31E is maintained by NYSDOT. All of the route within Niagara County, excluding the state-maintained overlap with NY 271 in Middleport, is county-maintained as the unsigned County Route 143 (CR 143). In Medina, NY 31E is entirely maintained by the village, though between the village line and Prospect Avenue (former NY 63), it was NYSDOT-maintained for 0.25 miles (0.40 km) to its terminus at NY 31 until 2010.

== History ==
In 1914, the New York State Legislature added two spur routes to Route 30, an unsigned legislative route extending from Niagara Falls in western Niagara County to Rouses Point in Clinton County via Medina. The first of these began at Route 30 (modern NY 63) and followed what is now NY 31E west to Middleport, from where it continued toward Lockport on current NY 31. On March 1, 1921, most of Route 30's Medina–Lockport spur route was supplanted by an extended Route 20. The lone exception was from Medina to Middleport, where Route 20 utilized modern NY 31 instead. When the first set of posted routes in New York were assigned in 1924, all of legislative Route 20 west of Rochester became part of NY 3.

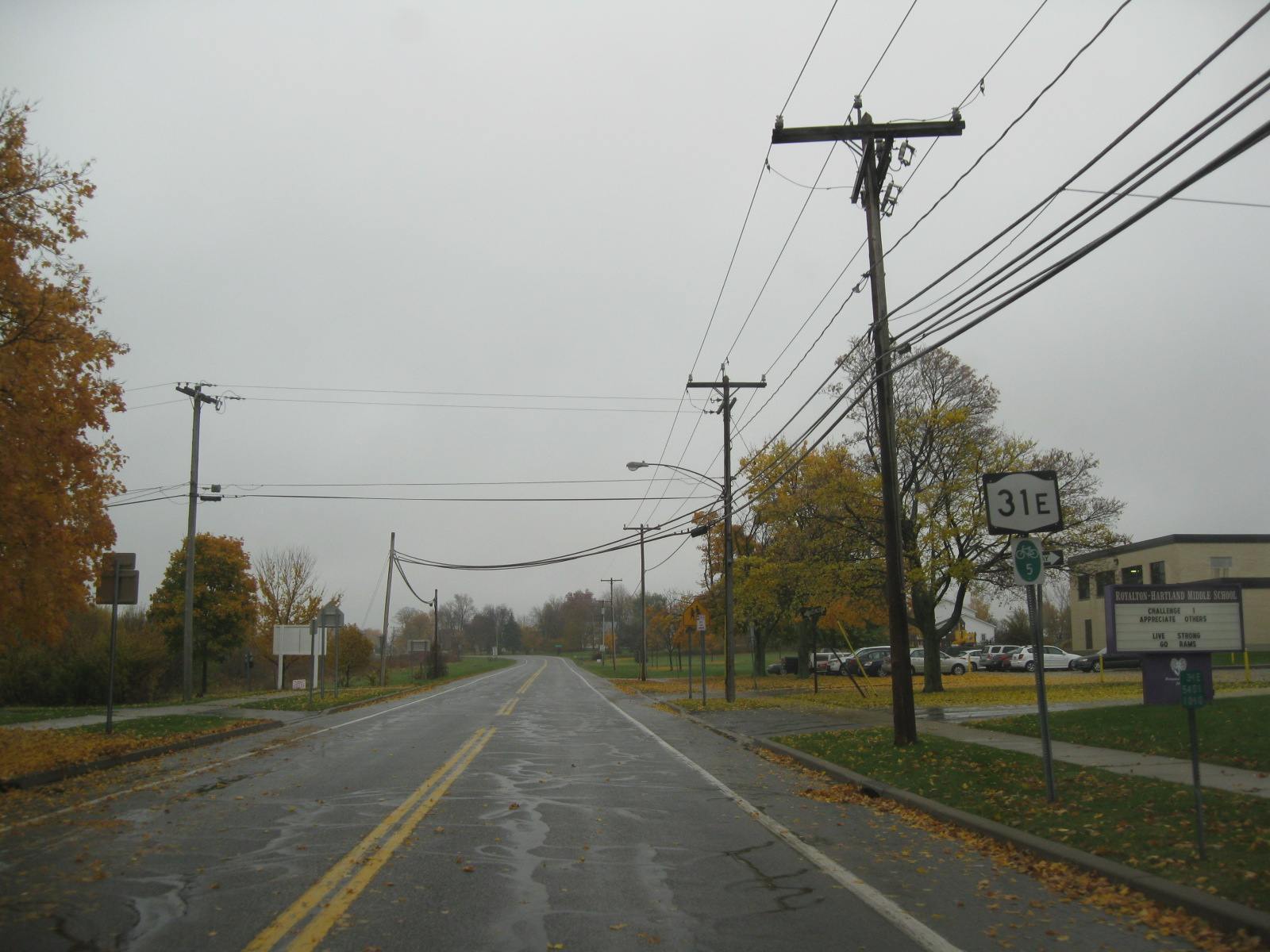
NY 31E eastbound in Middleport. Although this section is county-maintained, reference markers remain posted along the road, as seen here.

NY 3 remained on what is now NY 31 between Middleport and Medina until the 1930 renumbering of state highways in New York when it was realigned between the two villages to use what is now NY 31E. U.S. Route 104 was assigned to all of Ridge Road c. 1935, replacing then-NY 31 west of Rochester. As a result, NY 31 was shifted southward onto most of NY 3 from Niagara Falls to Rochester, including between Middleport and Medina. NY 31 was realigned on January 1, 1949, to follow its current alignment between the two villages. The former routing of NY 31 was redesignated as NY 31E, a northerly alternate route of NY 31.

The alignment of NY 31E has not changed since that time; however, ownership of parts of the route has changed hands over the years. Until 1998, NY 31E was state-maintained from its western terminus in Middleport to the Medina village line. On October 1, 1998, ownership and maintenance of NY 31E between NY 271 in Middleport and the Niagara–Orleans county line was transferred from the state to Niagara County as part of a highway maintenance swap between the two levels of government. This section of the route was subsequently co-designated, but not signed, as CR 143 by Niagara County.

== Major intersections ==
County	Location	mi	km	Destinations	Notes
Niagara	Middleport	0.00	0.00	NY 31 / NY 271 north – Lockport, Niagara Falls	Western terminus; southern terminus of NY 31E / NY 271 overlap; southern terminus of NY 271
Niagara	Middleport	0.51	0.82	NY 271 north	Northern terminus of NY 31E / NY 271 overlap
Orleans	Medina	5.05	8.13	NY 63 north	Western terminus of NY 31E / NY 63 overlap
Orleans	Medina	5.29	8.51	NY 31 / NY 63 south	Eastern terminus; eastern terminus of NY 31E / NY 63 overlap
1.000 mi = 1.609 km; 1.000 km = 0.621 mi: Concurrency terminus

== See also ==
- List of county routes in Niagara County, New York (126–143)
