= North Dakota State Hospital =

- North Dakota State Government
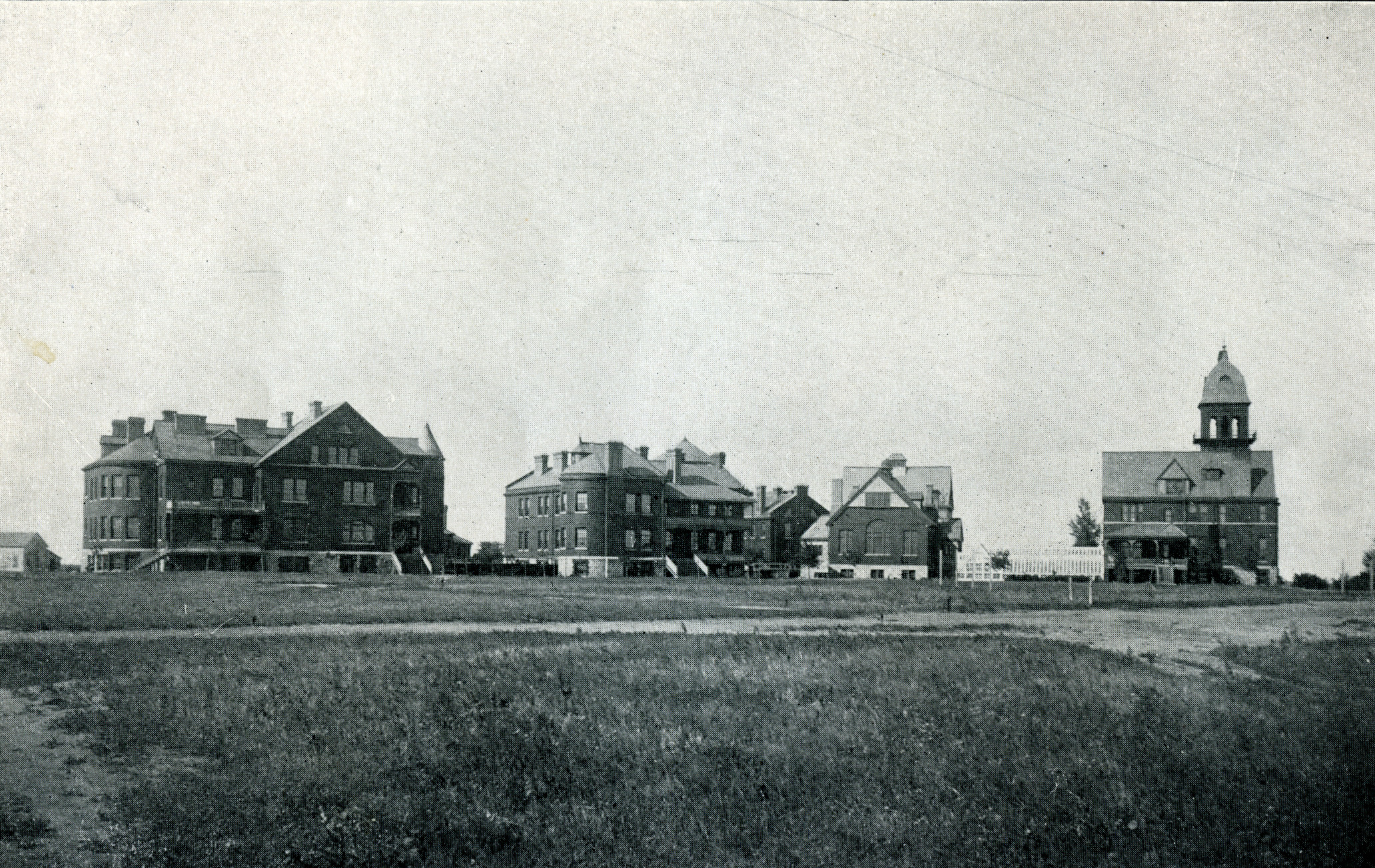
- State Insane Hospital, Jamestown, N.D., circa 1895-1901

Geography
- Location: 2605 Circle Drive, Jamestown, North Dakota, United States
- Coordinates: 46°52′58″N 98°41′12″W

Organization
- Type: Specialist

Services
- Beds: 108
- Speciality: Psychiatric hospital

History
- Opened: May 1, 1885

Links
- Lists: Hospitals in North Dakota

The North Dakota State Hospital, on the southern rim of the James River valley overlooking Jamestown, North Dakota, has since 1885 been North Dakota's primary institution for treating the mentally ill and confining the criminally insane.

== Early history ==
The North Dakota territorial legislature authorized a "hospital for the insane" in 1883. On May 1, 1885, the State Hospital opened, four years before North Dakota was granted statehood. Alongside the University of North Dakota, it is one of only two public institutions in North Dakota to predate statehood. The first superintendent was Dr. O. Wellington Archibald, who had previously worked for the US Army at Fort Abraham Lincoln near Mandan, North Dakota.

The new institution was praised by authorities of the time. Crowding, however, forced the institution to expand repeatedly, as the number of patients grew from 106 in 1886 to 819 in 1912, and then to 1,288 by 1920.

=== Forced sterilization ===
Along with many other states, North Dakota practiced forced sterilization of its patients. The practice began in 1914, and continued until the 1950s.

=== Corruption scandal ===
In June, 1937, Governor Bill Langer - one of North Dakota's most controversial political figures - fired Superintendent J.D. (John Dickson) Carr, (1872–1946) appointing Henry G. Owen in his place. Owen then fired 75% of the institution's staff, hiring their replacements, a January 30, 1939 report in the Fargo Forum alleged, due to their contributions to the state's governing Non-Partisan League and other political connections.

A January 30, 1939 report in the Fargo Forum detailed the results of state special examiner Clyde Duffy's report on his investigation into the political abuses, and their costs both financial and in quality of patient care. Duffy quoted a hospital employee "The new employees didn't know how to treat the patients. They called them bad names, cussed and swore at them. Some said they would run away and some did run away."

=== "Dark ages" ===
With a population that exceeded 2,000 in 1940, the hospital was in a state of crisis. A 1949 Fargo Forum article detailed a report from the American Psychiatric Association complaining of overcrowding, poorly qualified staff, and a general lack of organization.

The Legislature responded with an increase in appropriations and an extended period of reform under Dr. R.O. Saxvik, beginning in 1953. The extent of his reforms can be seen in a quote from his 1956 annual report "Gone are the cages, strait jackets, leg irons, stern guards, malnutrition, windowless seclusion rooms, unorganized departments, the sixty-hour work week, the naked despondent patient on a back ward, the odors from wards crammed with untidy and helpless men and women, the tuberculosis patients in disorganized treatment areas, the neglected surgical problems and the bedlam of disturbed units".

=== Deinstitutionalization ===
By the late 1970s, long-term in-patient placement was being downplayed in favor of treating the mentally ill at home through local and regional human service organizations. As a result, the population dipped from its peak in the 1940s of over 2,000, to under 600 in 1974, and around 200 today.

=== Adding the prison ===
Several of the hospital's buildings, vacant since deinstitutionalization, were converted to a medium-security prison facility beginning in 1998.

== Services ==
Currently, the hospital provides:

- Adult Psychiatric Services - adult inpatient care for serious mental illnesses.
- Transitional Living - a psychiatric "halfway house".
- Chemical Dependency Services - treatment for chemical abuse and addiction, especially when exacerbated by mental illness.
