= Middleport, New York =

Village in New York, United States

Middleport
- Village
- Village of Middleport
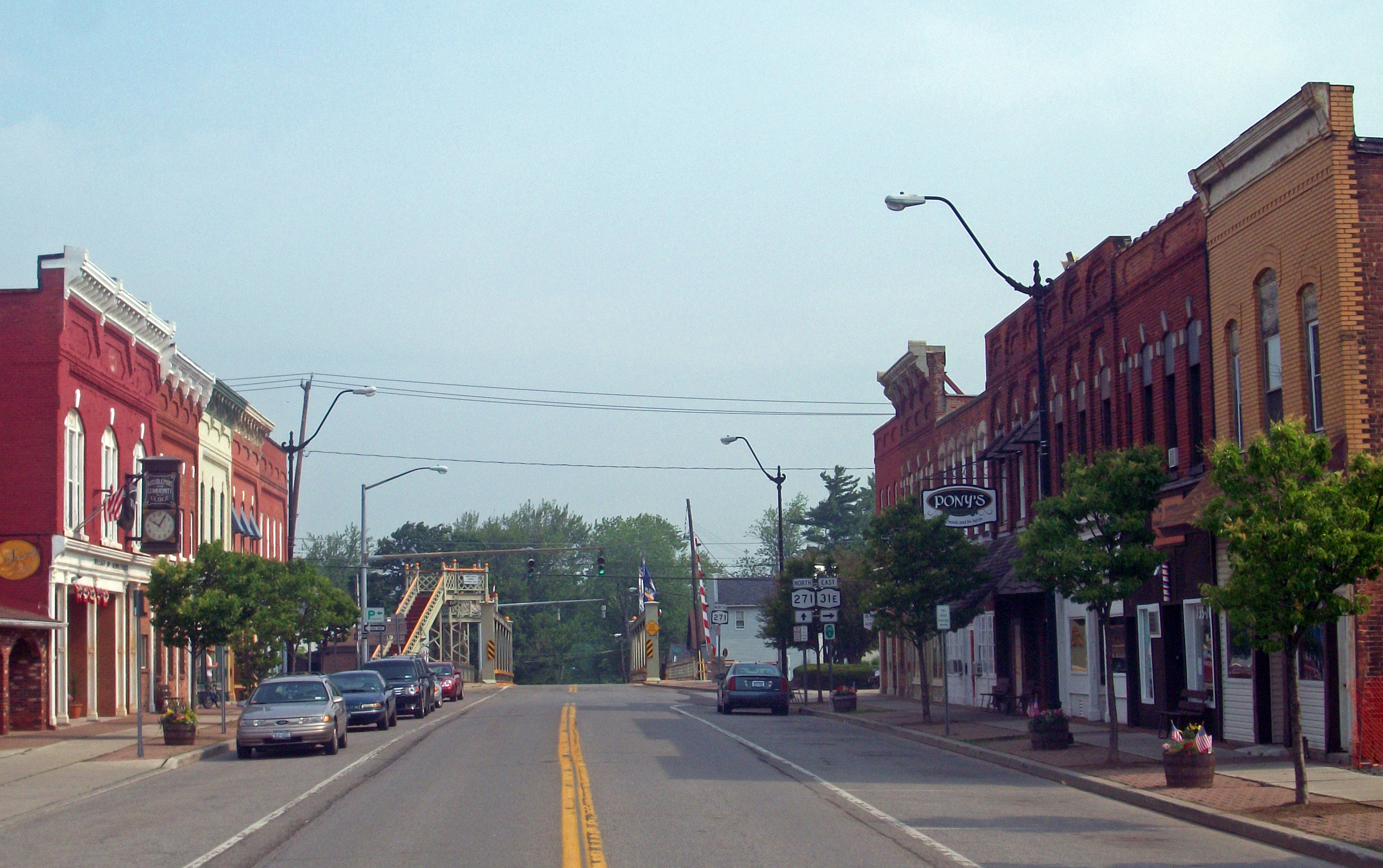
- View north along Main Street towards canal
- Nickname: Tea-Pot Hollow
- Motto: A Friendly Community
- Location in Niagara County and the state of New York
- Coordinates: 43°12′45″N 78°28′35″W
- Country: United States
- State: New York
- County: Niagara
- Towns: Hartland, Royalton

Government
  - Mayor: Dan Dodge

Area
  - Total: 0.87 sq mi (2.26 km^{2})
  - Land: 0.87 sq mi (2.26 km^{2})
  - Water: 0 sq mi (0.00 km^{2})
- Elevation: 515 ft (157 m)

Population (2020)
  - Total: 1,729
  - Density: 1,983/sq mi (765.7/km^{2})
- Time zone: UTC-5 (Eastern (EST))
  - Summer (DST): UTC-4 (EDT)
- ZIP code: 14105
- Area code: 716
- FIPS code: 36-46998
- GNIS feature ID: 0957150
- Website: Village of Middleport

Middleport is a village in Niagara County, New York, United States. As of the 2020 census, Middleport had a population of 1,729. The mail ZIP code is 14105. It is part of the Buffalo-Niagara Falls metropolitan area.

The Village of Middleport lies on the eastern edge of Niagara County, mostly inside the boundaries of the Town of Royalton, but a small part is within the Town of Hartland. Middleport is a port on the Erie Canal.

== History ==
Settlers began moving into the area circa 1808. The first store opened in the future village in 1822, before the canal reached the community.

The Erie Canal was opened along its entire length in 1825, and the community became an important location on the canal.

The village was formerly known as Tea-Pot Hollow before it was renamed Middleport.

The Village of Middleport was incorporated in 1872. The first election was held on March 22, 1859. The first meeting of the Board of Trustees was held on March 28, 1859.

The William Taylor House and U.S. Post Office are listed on the National Register of Historic Places.

== Geography ==
According to the United States Census Bureau, the village has a total area of 0.9 square miles (2.3 km^{2}), all land.

The village is located where north–south New York State Route 271 (Main Street) intersects east–west highways New York State Route 31 (Telegraph Road) and New York State Route 31E (State Street).

== Demographics ==
Historical population
Census	Pop.	Note	%±
1870	731		—
1880	771		5.5%
1890	1,217		57.8%
1900	1,431		17.6%
1910	1,530		6.9%
1920	1,416		−7.5%
1930	1,596		12.7%
1940	1,575		−1.3%
1950	1,641		4.2%
1960	1,882		14.7%
1970	2,132		13.3%
1980	1,995		−6.4%
1990	1,876		−6.0%
2000	1,917		2.2%
2010	1,840		−4.0%
2020	1,729		−6.0%
U.S. Decennial Census

As of the census of 2000, there were 1,917 people, 756 households, and 508 families residing in the village. The population density was 2,195.9 inhabitants per square mile (847.8/km^{2}). There were 828 housing units at an average density of 948.5 per square mile (366.2/km^{2}). The racial makeup of the village was 97.39% White, 0.83% African American, 0.26% Native American, 0.47% Asian, 0.26% from other races, and 0.78% from two or more races. Hispanic or Latino of any race were 1.77% of the population.

There were 756 households, out of which 35.4% had children under the age of 18 living with them, 52.5% were married couples living together, 10.3% had a female householder with no husband present, and 32.7% were non-families. 27.6% of all households were made up of individuals, and 13.9% had someone living alone who was 65 years of age or older. The average household size was 2.54 and the average family size was 3.11.

In the village, the population was spread out, with 28.7% under the age of 18, 6.4% from 18 to 24, 29.3% from 25 to 44, 20.7% from 45 to 64, and 14.9% who were 65 years of age or older. The median age was 36 years. For every 100 females, there were 90.0 males. For every 100 females age 18 and over, there were 87.5 males.

The median income for a household in the village was $36,464, and the median income for a family was $44,712. Males had a median income of $35,135 versus $22,500 for females. The per capita income for the village was $17,043. About 6.3% of families and 8.3% of the population were below the poverty line, including 7.1% of those under age 18 and 8.8% of those age 65 or over.
