= Royalton, New York =

- Town
- Location in Niagara County and the state of New York.

- Location within New York Location within the United States
- Coordinates: 43°10′24″N 78°32′39″W
- Country: United States
- State: New York
- County: Niagara

Government
  - Type: Town Council
  - Town Supervisor: Dan Bragg (R)
  - Town Council: Members' List: • Carol Wittcop (R); • Bradley L. Rehwaldt (R); • Lee Criswell (R, • Joshua Walker (C)

Area
  - Total: 70.27 sq mi (182.01 km^{2})
  - Land: 69.97 sq mi (181.21 km^{2})
  - Water: 0.31 sq mi (0.80 km^{2})
- Elevation: 643 ft (196 m)

Population (2010)
  - Total: 7,660
  - Estimate (2016): 7,541
  - Density: 107.8/sq mi (41.61/km^{2})
- Time zone: UTC-5 (Eastern (EST))
  - Summer (DST): UTC-4 (EDT)
- ZIP Codes: 14067 (Gasport); 14105 (Middleport); 14001 (Lockport); 14094 (Akron)
- FIPS code: 36-64034
- GNIS feature ID: 0979439
- Website: www.townofroyaltonny.gov

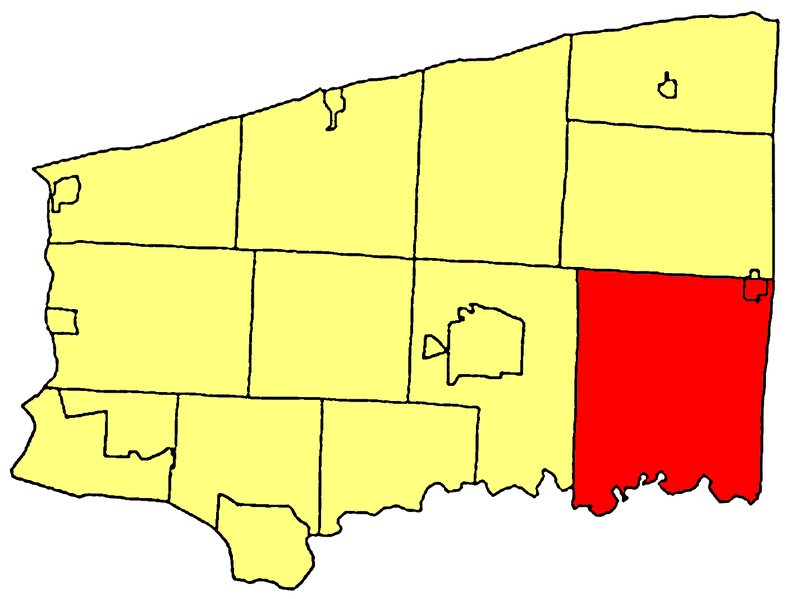
Location within Niagara County.

Royalton is a town in Niagara County, New York, United States. The population was 7,660 at the 2010 census.

The Town of Royalton is in the southeast corner of the county and is east of the City of Niagara Falls.

== History ==
The Town of Royalton was formed in 1817 from part of the Town of Hartland. The source of the town name is not currently known.

== Notable people ==
- Eugene Butler (serial killer), serial killer
- Michael Huskey, Medal of Honor recipient
- Belva Ann Lockwood, teacher, attorney, feminist
- Peter P. Murphy, former New York State Senator
- George F. Thompson, former New York State Senator
- Charles G. Williams, U.S. Representative from Wisconsin

== Geography ==
According to the United States Census Bureau, the town has a total area of 70.1 square miles (182 km^{2}), of which 69.8 square miles (181 km^{2}) is land and 0.3 square miles (0.78 km^{2}) (0.37%) is water.

The south border of the town is Tonawanda Creek. The Erie Canal runs through the northern part of the town and the Village of Middleport.

=== Adjacent cities and towns ===
- Town of Lockport - west
- Erie County, Town of Clarence - southwest
- Erie County, Town of Newstead - south
- Orleans County - east
- Town of Hartland - north

=== Major highways in the Town of Royalton ===
- New York State Route 31 (Rochester Rd., Telegraph Rd.), East-West Highway through the north part of town that roughly parallels the Erie Canal from the Lockport town line through Middleport on to Orleans County.
- New York State Route 77 (Chesnut Ridge Rd., Lewiston Rd.), North-South roadway from the Town of Lockport through the town into the Tonawanda State Wildlife Management Area and on into Orleans County.
- New York State Route 93 (Akron Rd., Dysinger Rd.) East-West roadway from the Lockport town line, through the town. The route then travels southeast on its east course into the Town of Newstead crossing over Tonawanda Creek on its way to Akron.
- New York State Route 271 (Main St.(Middleport)) North-South roadway from the Town of Hartland to its southern end at Telegraph Rd. (NY 31) in Middleport, in northern Hartland.

== Demographics ==
Historical population
Census	Pop.	Note	%±
1820	1,849		—
1830	3,138		69.7%
1840	3,549		13.1%
1850	4,024		13.4%
1860	4,793		19.1%
1870	4,726		−1.4%
1880	4,888		3.4%
1890	4,632		−5.2%
1900	4,797		3.6%
1910	4,956		3.3%
1920	4,485		−9.5%
1930	4,660		3.9%
1940	4,617		−0.9%
1950	5,297		14.7%
1960	6,586		24.3%
1970	7,375		12.0%
1980	7,765		5.3%
1990	7,453		−4.0%
2000	7,710		3.4%
2010	7,660		−0.6%
2016 (est.)	7,541		−1.6%
U.S. Decennial Census

As of the census of 2000, there were 7,710 people, 2,810 households, and 2,121 families residing in the town. The population density was 110.4 inhabitants per square mile (42.6/km^{2}). There were 2,993 housing units at an average density of 42.9 per square mile (16.6/km^{2}). The racial makeup of the town was 97.17% White, 0.64% African American, 0.38% Native American, 0.53% Asian, 0.04% Pacific Islander, 0.18% from other races, and 1.06% from two or more races. Hispanic or Latino of any race were 0.92% of the population.

There were 2,810 households, out of which 35.3% had children under the age of 18 living with them, 63.7% were married couples living together, 8.0% had a female householder with no husband present, and 24.5% were non-families. 20.0% of all households were made up of individuals, and 9.0% had someone living alone who was 65 years of age or older. The average household size was 2.71 and the average family size was 3.13.

In the town, the population was spread out, with 26.5% under the age of 18, 6.8% from 18 to 24, 30.0% from 25 to 44, 23.6% from 45 to 64, and 13.1% who were 65 years of age or older. The median age was 37 years. For every 100 females, there were 98.3 males. For every 100 females age 18 and over, there were 95.8 males.

The median income for a household in the town was $43,516, and the median income for a family was $48,375. Males had a median income of $35,217 versus $24,293 for females. The per capita income for the town was $18,049. About 4.5% of families and 6.8% of the population were below the poverty line, including 7.3% of those under age 18 and 7.4% of those age 65 or over.

== Communities and locations in the Town of Royalton ==
- Dysinger – A hamlet on Route 93.
- Gasport – A hamlet on the Erie Canal and Route 31 (Rochester Road).
- Gilberts Corners – A hamlet on Route 77.
- Leslie – A hamlet on Tonawanda Creek Road and Rapids Road.
- McNalls Corners – A hamlet on NY-77 west of Royalton Center.
- Middleport – The Village of Middleport is in the northeast corner of the town.
- Orangeport – A hamlet on the Erie Canal and west of Gasport on NY-31.
- Reynales Basin – A location on the Erie Canal east of Gasport.
- Royalton Airport (9G5) – A small general aviation airport south of Gasport.
- Royalton Center – A hamlet on NY-77 (Chesnut Ridge Road) and Royalton Center Road. The community was originally called "Carringtons Corners."
- Royalton Ravine County Park – A park south of Gasport.
- Terrys Corners – A small hamlet on NY-77 (Chesnut Ridge Road) near the western town line.
- Tonawanda Wildlife Management Area – Part of this conservation area is in the southeast part of the town.
- Tonawanda Reservation – An uninhabited part of the reservation is in the town,
- Wolcottsville – A hamlet in the southeast part of the town
