= Crowley House =

Crowley House may refer to:

- Crowley House (North Adams, Massachusetts), listed on the NRHP in Massachusetts
- Crowley House (Thousand Oaks, California), Ventura County Historical Landmark 109
- Crowley House (Willcox, Arizona), listed on the National Register of Historic Places in Cochise County, Arizona
- Chase-Crowley-Keep House, Lockport, New York, listed on the NRHP in New York
