= Detroit Waldorf School =

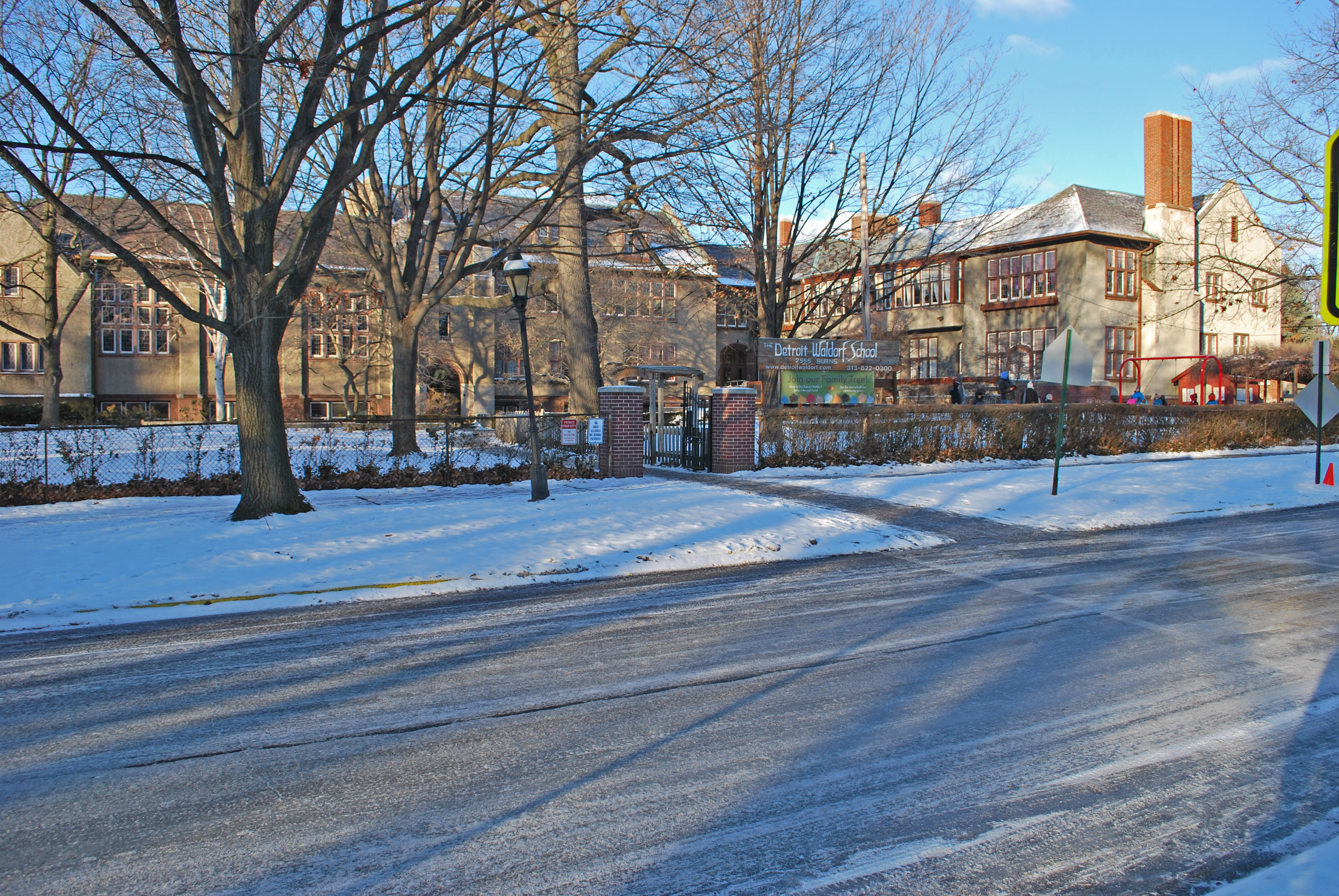
- Entrance to Detroit Waldorf (east side), 2015

Location
- 2555 Burns Avenue; Detroit, Michigan 48214; United States; 42.3645°N 82.9975°W

Information
- Type: Private Waldorf school
- Established: 1965
- Founders: Rudolf and Amelia Wilhelm
- Staff: 68
- Grades: Pre-K - 8th
- Enrollment: 250
- Campus size: 4 acres (16,000 m^{2})
- Campus type: Urban
- Tuition: $7,200 - $13,850
- Website: www.detroitwaldorf.org
- Indian Village
- U.S. National Register of Historic Places
- U.S. Historic district – Contributing property
- Michigan State Historic Site
- Built: 1913
- Architect: Albert Kahn
- Architectural style: Tudor Revival, Arts and Crafts
- NRHP reference No.: 72000667
- MSHS No.: 2281

Significant dates
- Added to NRHP: March 24, 1972
- Designated MSHS: September 24, 2016

The Detroit Waldorf School is a private PreK-8 Waldorf school located at 2555 Burns, Detroit, Michigan, United States, in an Albert Kahn-designed school in the historic Indian Village neighborhood. In 2016, the building was designated a Michigan State Historic Site. The school is the only remaining private independent school in Detroit, and is one of the city's highest-rated schools, receiving five stars on GreatSchools.org. As of 2024, 250 students were enrolled in the school.

== Building history ==
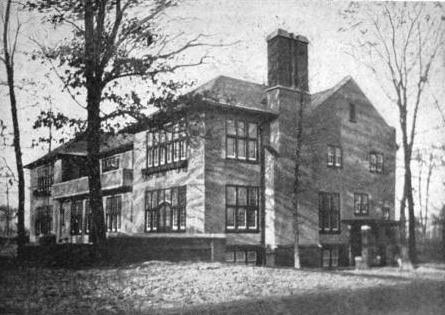
Eastern Liggett School c. 1916, showing the original 1913 building

In 1878, Rev. James D. Liggett settled in Detroit and established a small, independent school for girls, originally known as The Detroit Home and Day School, and later as The Liggett School. The school was originally located at Grand River and Broadway in Detroit, and quickly established itself with many of Detroit's most prominent families. The school incorporated in 1881, with a board of directors that included Dexter M. Ferry, Jacob S. Farrand, and David Whitney Jr. By 1883, the school had grown from 57 students to 194, and had outgrown its first home. The school moved to a new location at Cass and Stimson. The school continued to grow steadily, and by 1897 had annexed an adjacent house. The next year, the school contracted Albert Kahn to design a gymnasium and other additions to the school, one of Kahn's first professional jobs.

In 1913, the school decided to develop an eastern branch campus to serve students on the city's east side. This site in Indian Village along Charlevoix was chosen, and the school again contracted Albert Kahn to design a new building. The building is one of only three schools designed by Kahn, and the only one still extant. Kahn's design for the school drew from then-popular English influences, and was a radical departure from previous school designs, both in his extravagant use of windows and use of stucco rather than brick. The building opened the following year as the "Eastern Liggett" branch. In 1916, landscape architect O. C. Simonds designed a landscape plan for the school.

Enrollment at the Eastern Liggett School was 88 in 1913, which rose to 200 by 1919. By the early 1920s, changes in the neighborhood around the Cass Avenue campus led to declining enrollment there. In 1923, the school decided to enlarge the Eastern Liggett building and close the original one. An addition to the school, also designed by Kahn, was constructed in 1924, and houses an auditorium and additional classroom space. The addition so closely follows the style of the original building that the difference is nearly imperceptible. Enrollment rose to a high of around 300 students in 1929; although the Great Depression reduced enrollment, the Liggett School continued to occupy the building until the early 1960s, when the changing nature of Detroit caused the school to decide to move. In 1964, construction began on a new school, and in early 1965, Liggett moved from the Indian Village campus to Grosse Pointe Woods, Michigan. In 1969, The Liggett School merged with Grosse Pointe University School to form what is now University Liggett School.

== Detroit Waldorf history ==
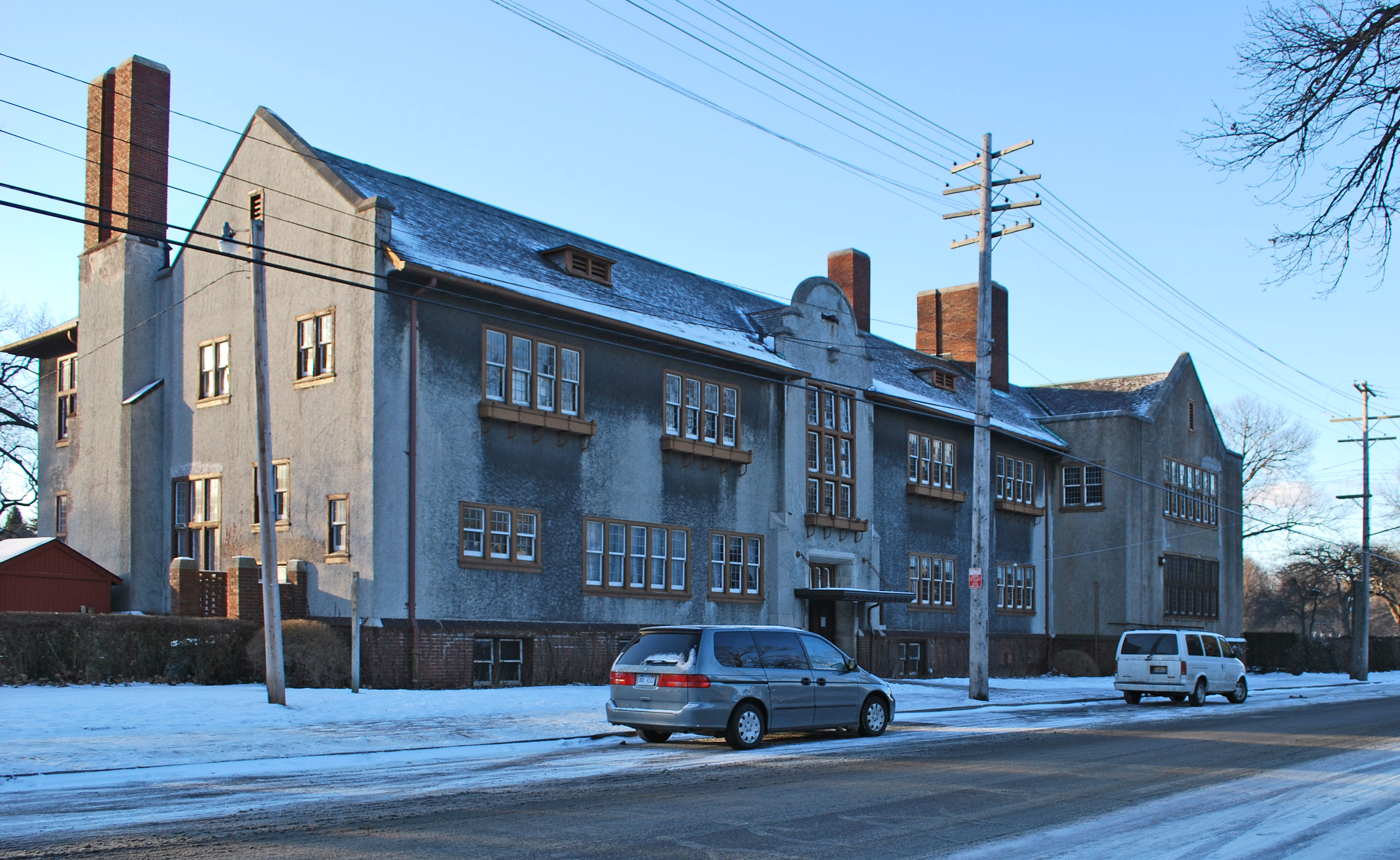
Detroit Waldorf School north side, 2015

=== Founding ===
The Detroit Waldorf School was founded in 1965 by Rudolf and Amelia Wilhelm, who wanted to provide Detroiters more choices in educating their children. Other private schools in the area at the time were not integrated, and the Wilhelms and their supporters sought to provide a diverse educational experience to children. The school approached the board of the Central United Methodist Church about allocating space to open a nursery school. An impassioned speech by African-American Junius Harris, where he reminded board members that families of color had far fewer educational choices for their children, convinced the board to allow the Waldorf nursery school to open in their building. The school was deliberately integrated from its founding.

In 1965, Detroit Waldorf School hired Theo and Marianne Buergin from the Highland Hall Waldorf School and opened as a nursery school located in the Central United Methodist Church. However, space in the church was limited, and later that year the school acquired the just-vacated Liggett campus in Indian Village. Classes for elementary students began at the Indian Village school building in September 1966. The Detroit Waldorf School was one of the first nine Waldorf schools in North America, and a founding member of the Association of Waldorf Schools of North America (AWSNA).

In 1967, Werner and Barbara Glas founded the Waldorf Institute at the school. The Waldorf Institute was the first Waldorf teacher-training institution in the United States, and only the second English-speaking one. In 1979, the Waldorf Institute moved to Southfield, Michigan, and in 1986 moved to Chestnut Ridge, New York. It is now the Sunbridge Institute.

=== Growth and change ===
By 1970, the school had 170 students enrolled. Over time, a grade was added each year, and in 1975 the school began offering high school education. By this year, enrollment had risen to 267 students. In the 1970s, disagreements led some parents to leave Detroit Waldorf and found another school. In 1981, the Buergins left the school. Later in the 1980s, Detroit Waldorf School closed its high school, and there were discussions about moving the school out of Detroit and into the suburbs. Despite this, Detroit Waldorf School remained in Detroit. However, enrollment dropped to around 200 in 2001 and 147 in 2006. In 2008, during the Great Recession, enrollment dropped still farther, dipping as low as 120 students.

In 2011, the school was selected by the National Trust for Historic Preservation as one of 100 "places that matter" in the United States. In 2013, businessman Jeff Adler donated $750,000 to various Detroit organizations, including $100,000 to the Detroit Waldorf School. In 2016, at the time of the Detroit Waldorf School's 50th anniversary, the school was designated a Michigan State Historic Site. A state of Michigan historical marker was erected at the school commemorating both the original occupant of the building, Eastern Liggett School, and Detroit Waldorf School. By 2017, enrollment had rebounded to 240 students.

=== The 2020s ===
In the summer of 2020, in response to the COVID-19 pandemic, the school constructed outdoor classrooms. The structures were built over the summer and helped the school return to in-person learning at the beginning of the 2020/2021 school year.

The Detroit Waldorf School has maintained a commitment to providing a strong Waldorf education children in Detroit, and to racial, ethnic, geographic, and social-economic diversity in its student body. The school has remained at its present location since 1966.

== Academics ==
=== Education in the Early Childhood Center ===
The Detroit Waldorf School Early Childhood Center includes Pre-K classes for children 3-5 and full-day Kindergarten. The focus in the Early Childhood Center is on language and stories in circle/story time, and on indoor and outdoor creative free play. The school believes that free play is a fundamental part of early learning, fostering imagination, creativity, problem solving and social skills which aid in academic learning in later years. Children in the Early Childhood Center experience movement in play, including skipping, jumping rope, and eurythmy. They also do arts and handwork, including coloring, painting, modeling with beeswax, and baking bread.

=== Elementary and middle school academics ===
Beginning in elementary school, the core academic subjects (language arts, mathematics, science, and social studies) are presented in a two-hour main lesson each day. The subject of the main lesson rotates every three to four weeks. The school believes that presenting material in blocks lets students explore the material more deeply.

In addition to the core academic subjects, students also learn two foreign languages (Spanish and German), as well as music, movement, arts, and handwork. The curriculum integrates the traditional academic subjects with the arts to provide engaging experiences for the student. The school aims to not only educate students, but also to prepare them to be creative, critical thinkers with individual initiative.

Language Arts begins with an introduction to letters, reading, and handwriting in the first grade. It continues through spelling and grammar, further reading, research and creative writing, poetry, and composition. Students read stories, fables, and literature, culminating in a Shakespearean play in eighth grade. Each grade also puts on a class play.

Mathematics starts with basic arithmetic and the introduction to numbers, and continues with multiplication, division, fractions, exponents, and roots. Geometry is taught in the middle and upper grades. The upper grades begin studying business math, pre-algebra, and algebra, including graphing equations.

Science is introduced in the lower grades through observation and experience with nature, as well as gardening and cooking. Science continues in the middle grades with zoology, botany, and astronomy, and in the upper grades with physics, chemistry, anatomy, mechanics, and meteorology.

Social Studies begins in the earlier grades with legends, myths, and folklore. It segues to local and world geography, and history from ancient Greek history through Medieval and Renaissance times to the present.

Foreign Language includes both Spanish and German. Teaching the languages parallels what students learn in Language Arts; this includes reading, conversation, and composition.

Music begins with singing. Singing continues through later grades in chorus. All students also learn to play musical instruments. The early grades use a flute and recorder; the upper grades begin with stringed instruments and eventually into orchestra.

Movement and Physical Education is introduced in the form of games and eurythmy. Gymnastics is introduced later, as well as dancing and team sports.

Art and Handwork is introduced with painting, drawing, knitting, and beeswax modeling. As students progress, more sophisticated painting and drawing is introduced, as well as carving, pottery, sculpture, cross-stitch, sewing, carpentry, and woodworking.

=== After school programs ===
The school offers various after-school programs for students. These include competitive sports, physical activities, musical instruction, and Games. 2015/2016 offerings include basketball, track, soccer, tennis, volleyball, circus arts, kinderharp, guitar, brain games, and chess.

=== Accreditation ===
The Detroit Waldorf School is accredited by the Independent Schools Association of the Central States (ISACS), the Association of Waldorf Schools of North America (AWSNA), and the Waldorf Early Childhood Association of North America (WECAN).

== Alumni ==
Notable alumni of the Detroit Waldorf School include:

- Big Sean, hip-hop artist
- Scott Boman, Libertarian politician
- Sufjan Stevens, singer-songwriter
- Veronica Webb, model and actress
