= High Mowing School =

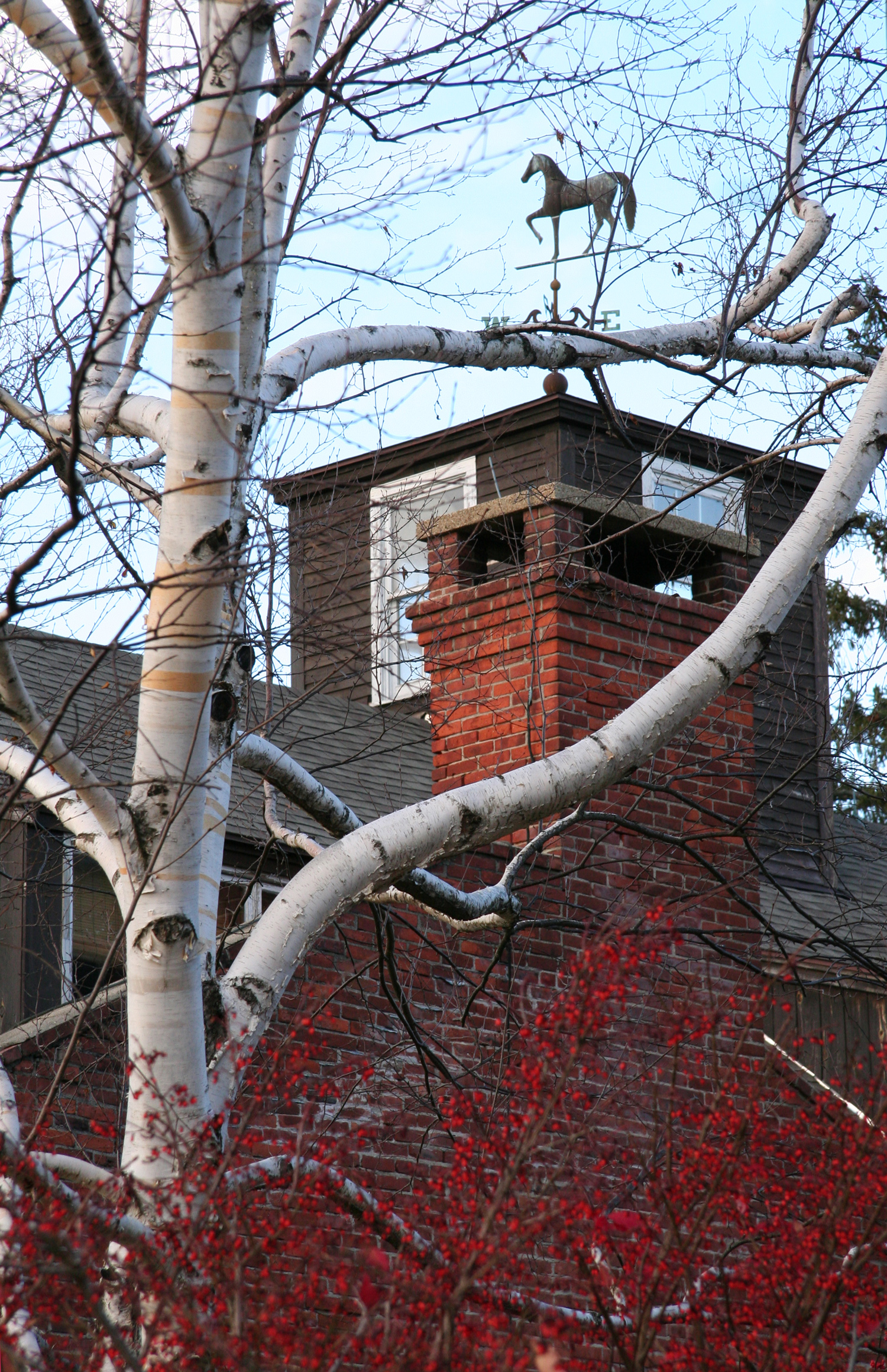

Location
- 222 Isaac Frye Highway; Wilton, New Hampshire 03086; United States; 42°49′3″N 71°44′38″W

Information
- Type: Private, independent
- Established: 1942
- Founder: Beulah Hepburn Emmet (1890–1978)
- Teaching staff: 45.4 (on an FTE basis)
- Enrollment: 301 (2019-20)
- Student to teacher ratio: 6.6
- Education system: Waldorf
- Campus: Rural
- Colors: Green and white
- Website: www.highmowing.org

Founded in 1942, High Mowing School is an independent private, co-educational, day and boarding school, located in Wilton, New Hampshire, in the United States. High Mowing serves students in early childhood through grade 12. It is the oldest Waldorf high school and the only Waldorf boarding school in the United States.

== History ==
Nestled in the Monadnock Region of southern New Hampshire, the school's campus was once the family home of its founder, Beulah Hepburn Emmet, a teacher who was displeased with the politics in the public school in Connecticut in which she taught. Both the school and its name are rooted in its hilltop farm location. Inspired by the writings and educational theories of Rudolf Steiner, Mrs. Emmet opened the school in 1942. It is the first Waldorf high school to have been founded in North America. Since that time, the casual comfort of the old farm site has welcomed teenagers from around the globe. Students experience the Waldorf curriculum, as they live and work in close proximity to their teachers and classmates. High Mowing is the only Waldorf high school on the continent to offer a boarding program as well as a day school.

The name, "High Mowing", has its roots in New England's colonial past. The practice of cutting or mowing hayfields to feed farm animals was a long-standing tradition there. According to English custom, these hayfields were often called "mowings" by the early settlers. A "high mowing" referred to a hilltop field, regarded as a perfect name for a school with high ambitions for its students. It was also believed to be an ideal setting for young adults to grow intellectually, artistically and socially, while living and learning with students from the region and around the world.

Pine Hill Waldorf School, an elementary school founded in 1972, merged with High Mowing School in 2017.

== Academics ==
A liberal arts curriculum meant to promote "engaged and active learning" forms the basis of High Mowing's academics. Each school day begins, for each grade, with "Main lesson Block" – an integrative hour and 45 minute class that runs for between three and four weeks. Subjects for block classes encompass history, literature, drama, science, and mathematics. Students create their own "Block Book" for each class of the work they create during their study of the block material. Approximately one third of blocks are devoted to the sciences and one third to historical subjects. Others focus on drama, literature, or math. Examples of blocks include World Religions, Russian Literature, Government, Economics, Geology, Zoology & Evolution, Biochemistry, Atomic Theory, Surveying & Trigonometry, Dante, Greek Drama, Permutations and Combinations, Thermodynamics, History Through Art, and History through Architecture.

Block classes are followed by track classes, typically four each day. These include English, Mathematics, Natural Sciences, History, World Languages, and Studio and Performing Arts. Many of these are required courses for underclassmen and are taken in sequence beginning with the introductory course. Four years of track classes are required in the subjects Language Arts, Natural Sciences, and Studio & Performing Arts, three years in Mathematics and Physical Education, and two in World Language and History. Electives are courses freely chosen by students and are more common to upperclassmen who have completed core requirements. Examples of electives include Naturalist, Great Novels, French, Spanish, and German, Philosophy, Biology, Physics, Filmmaking and Digital Arts, Eurythmy, Drawing and Painting, Woodwork, and Pottery.

Special programs include: naturalist, fine and applied arts, apprenticeship pottery program, farm and garden program, and an annual, immersive, interest-based two week "Projects Block." The Waldorf curriculum for each grade is developmentally-based, focusing on the central question that students typically encounter at that age. High Mowing is accredited by the New England Association of Schools and Colleges and the Association of Waldorf Schools of North America.

== Demographics ==
The demographic breakdown of the 108 students enrolled for 2013–14 was:

- Native American/Alaskan – 0%
- Asian/Pacific islanders – 6.5%
- Black – 0.9%
- Hispanic – 5.6%
- White – 87.0%
- Multiracial – 0%

== Traditions ==
=== Chapel ===
Chapel, held on Sunday nights on campus, was originally a weekly spiritual/religious event begun by the school's founder, Mrs. Emmet. It now typically occurs less frequently and is designed to allow students and faculty to "reflect on the changing world and our responsibilities to it." Members of the broader community such as parents and alumni, as well as faculty and students, are invited to give talks at Chapel. Boarding students are required to attend Chapel while it is optional for day students.

=== Christmas Block ===
==== Greens Sunday ====
Students returning from Thanksgiving Break attend school on Sunday afternoon to commemorate the beginning of the holiday season. Among other activities, they gather pine branches and laurels from the surrounding woods to make wreaths and other decorations. A large Christmas tree is brought into the main room of the main building on campus. Afterward, the Advent Chapel is held.

==== Caroling chapel ====
At the caroling chapel, students and faculty sing Christmas carols while the tree is decorated.

==== Nativity ====
The annual depiction of the story of the birth of Jesus is a theatrical and musical event originally designed by Mrs. Emmet. It involves Mary and Joseph, the angel Gabriel, numerous other angels, a host of shepherds, and the Three Kings. A sizable percentage of the student body participates in the short play, which is followed by the Snow Goose Party, an annual students-only event.

==== The Yule Festival ====
This event has been held every year since the school's founding on the night before Winter Break. It is preceded by an all-school holiday dinner, and semi-formal dress is appreciated. The festival has a number of built-in traditions including a skit by the "fools", a movement-based rendition of the carol "A Partridge in a Pear Tree" by seniors, the reading of a Christmas story from the Bible in as many languages as are spoken in the school community, the Yule Log, wassailing, and the presentation of the Christmas book, a compilation of artwork (generally holiday-themed) made of the contributions of all students.

=== May Day ===
May Day takes place in the spring and is meant to celebrate the end of winter and the new season. The event is open to the public and involves a number of events and activities. These include a pottery sale, musical performances, cake walks, games and other entertainment for children, a grease pole with a twenty dollar bill at the top, a cow plop competition (in which the winner is the one onto whose pre-purchased field space an ushered-in cow first excretes fecal matter), and the Maypole Dance. The Maypole is a tall wooden pole buried in the ground on the center green-space and is a metaphor for the fertility of spring. Students hold colored bands originating at the top of the pole and dance around each other on the ground, creating a weave pattern of the fabric on the pole. Another tradition, the May Day Play, is a skit put on by students and faculty. Initially Queen and King Winter (played by faculty members) attempt to proclaim the predominance of winter over spring, backing up their assertions by tossing ice and icicles into the crowd. Eventually the Spring Fairy enters and proclaims that spring is nigh and that the representatives of Winter should be gone. At one point the audience is asked which they would prefer, Winter or Spring, at which point (most) everyone cheers for "Spring". The Spring Fairy typically sprinkles flower petals and other plant materials on audience members as well as Queen and King Winter. They are eventually "driven off" and the Queen and King of Spring (played by students) are crowned to commemorate the season.

== Athletics ==
High Mowing considers regular physical activity essential to the well-being of its students. Every student participates in Morning Activity before Main Lesson Block, which changes with the block. Activities include ultimate Frisbee, yoga, dance, walking, and games. Afternoon activities include both team sports and other activities. High Mowing is a member of NEPSAC District Two and competes with other New England schools with boys'/girls' soccer in the fall, boys'/girls' basketball in the winter, and boys' baseball and girls' lacrosse in the spring. Other afternoon activities may include, depending on the year and season, cross-country running, skiing, and hiking. Physical education requirements fulfilled by participation in afternoon activities are necessary to graduate from High Mowing.

== Notable alumni ==
- David E. Blackmer, audio electronics inventor
- Austin Chick, film director, screenwriter and producer
- Nancy Huston, novelist
- Penelope Jenks, sculptor
- Julianna Margulies, actress
- Judson Mills, actor
- John Fitzallen Moore, physicist and innovator
- Meredith Hall, author

== Notable events ==
The first NOFA (Northeast Organic Farming) Summer Conference was held at the school in 1975.

== See also ==
- Curriculum of the Waldorf schools
- List of boarding schools
