= Indian Village, Detroit =

- U.S. National Register of Historic Places
- U.S. Historic district
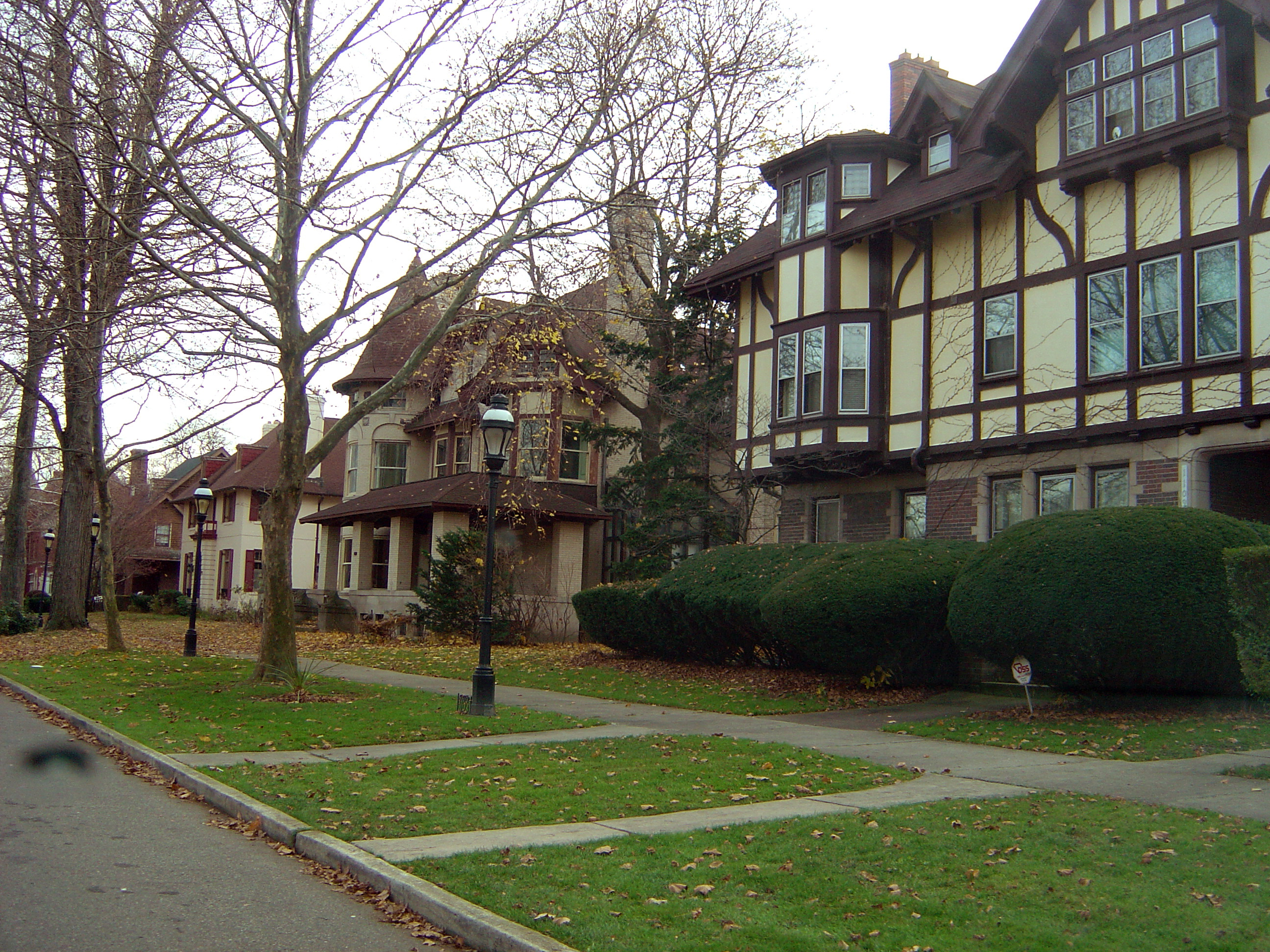
- Homes on Iroquois Street
- Interactive map
- Location: Detroit, Michigan, U.S.
- Coordinates: 42°21′37″N 82°59′46″W
- Built: 1894
- Architectural style: Colonial Revival, Tudor Revival, Renaissance Revival, Spanish Mission Revival, Federal, Georgian Revival
- NRHP reference No.: 72000667
- Added to NRHP: March 24, 1972

Indian Village is a neighborhood located in Detroit, Michigan, bounded to the north and south by Mack Avenue and East Jefferson Avenue, respectively, along the streets of Burns, Iroquois, and Seminole. The district was listed on the National Register of Historic Places in 1972.

== Overview ==
The district has a number of architecturally-significant homes built in the early 20th century. Some of the houses have been substantially restored, and many others are well kept up. Bordering Indian Village to the west is West Village, with additional historic homes, townhouses and apartments.

Many of the homes were designed by prominent architects, such as Albert Kahn, Louis Kamper and William B. Stratton, for some of the area's most prominent citizens, such as Edsel Ford. A lot of homes are very large, with some over 12,000 square feet (1,100 m^{2}). Many have a carriage house, with some of those being larger than an average suburban home. Some of the houses also have large amounts of Pewabic Pottery tiles.

Indian Village has very active community organizations, including the Indian Village Association, Men's Garden Club and Women's Garden Club. The neighborhood hosts an annual Home & Garden Tour on the first Saturday in June, neighborhood yard sales in September, a holiday home tour in December, and many other community events. The neighborhood contains many historic homes including that of automotive entrepreneur Henry Leland, founder of Lincoln and Cadillac, who resided at 1052 Seminole St. With a white population of 63 percent Indian Village is one of Detroit's few white majority neighborhoods.

== Schools ==
Detroit Public Schools operates the area's public schools.

Residents are zoned to Nichols Elementary School, Marcus Garvey African Centered Academy K-8 for middle school, and Southeastern High School. On previous occasions, Butzel Middle School served Indian Village.

Private schools serving Indian Village include the Benjamin E. Mays Male Academy, the Detroit Waldorf School and Detroit Friends School. Cornerstone Schools formerly operated the K-5 Iroquois Campus in Indian Village.

== Notable buildings ==
Name	Image	Year	Location	Style	Architect	Notes
John Beaumont House		1911	1090 Seminole	Federal	Donaldson and Meier	Founding member of law firm of Smith, Beaumont, and Harris.
Bliemaster House		1917	3465 Burns	English Colonial	Mildner and Eisen	Built for Jacob Schaeffer, who built and owned the largest storage facility at the time. Mildner and Eisen also built the building on the south-east side of Mack and Gratiot.
James Burgess Book Jr. House		1911	8469 East Jefferson Ave.	Neo-Renaissance	Louis Kamper	
Warren Scripps Booth House		1922	2950 Iroquois	English Cottage	Marcus Burrowes	Son of Cranbrook founders George and Ellen Scripps Booth. President, Publisher and Chairman of The Detroit News.
Arthur and Clara Buhl House		1908	1116 Iroquois	Gothic, Tudor	John Scott	Member of the family whose fortune eventually built the Buhl Building.
Jacob Carl Danziger House		1911	1485 Burns		Bernard C. Wetzel	Danziger was treasurer and general manager of Detroit Motor Casting.
Bingley Fales House		1907	1771 Seminole	Neo-Georgian	Chittenden & Kotting	At 15,000 sq ft (1,400 m^{2}), this house is the largest in Indian Village.
Goebel House		1912	1480 Seminole	German Baroque, Tudor, Arts and Crafts	Chittenden & Kotting	Built for Fritz Goebel, vice president (and younger son of the founder) of Goebel Brewing Company.
James Hamilton House		1902	8325 East Jefferson Ave.	Tudor Revival	Stratton & Baldwin	
William F. Harris House			8335 East Jefferson Ave.			
Christian Henry Hecker House		1915	1763 Iroquois		MacFarlane, Maul, and Lentz	Son of Colonel Frank J. Hecker. Christian Hecker served as president of the Hecker Insurance Co.
George M. Holley		1916	2152 Burns		William Van Tine	Founded the Holley Carburetor Company.
Robert Hupp House		1911	1516 Iroquois	Prairie Style	George Valentine Pottle	Home of the auto baron who built the Huppmobile.
Hurlbut Memorial Gate		1894	E. Jefferson at Cadillac Blvd.	Beaux Arts	Brede & Mueller	Restored in 2007.
Jefferson Avenue Presbyterian Church		1926	8625 E. Jefferson Ave.	Gothic Revival	Wirt C. Rowland	Founded in 1854. Built in 1926 by Wirt C. Rowland, the Church contains ornate carvings with corbels and shields for each of the Apostles.
Louis Kamper House		1910	2150 Iroquois	Neo-Renaissance	Louis Kamper	Built by Kamper as his family's home.
John Kay House		1916	2924 Iroquois	Colonial Revival	Oscar C. Gottesleben	Built for John Kay, prominent jeweler and founder of Wright, Kay & Company, for an estimated cost of $8,000.
Bernard G. Koether and Harriet Bowerman House		1923	2921 Burns		Herman & Simons	Koether was GM executive, director of sales, advertising, and public relations.
Henry Leland House		1901	1052 Seminole St.	Tudor Revival	Unknown	Henry Leland was an entrepreneur and machinist who founded Lincoln and Cadillac.
Julius T. Melchers House		1897	723 Seyburn	Colonial Revival	Donaldson and Meier	Home of Detroit sculptor Julius T. Melchers. The gable of the house is carved by Melchers.
Edwin Nelson House			8311 East Jefferson Ave.	Federal		
Pewabic Pottery Co.		1907	10125 E. Jefferson Ave.	Tudor	Stratton & Baldwin	Mary Chase Perry Stratton, the founder of Pewabic Pottery was married to one of the architects.
Cornelius Ray House		1910	1500 Seminole	French - American colonial	Louis Kamper	
Russel House		1890	1075 Burns Ave.	Richardsonian Romanesque	Walter S. Russel	Moved to its present site in 1921, once located at Jefferson Avenue and Joseph Campau Street.
Enoch Smith House (aka "Ford Honeymoon House")		1915	2171 Iroquois			Purchased by Edsel B. Ford in 1917. Edsel and Eleanor Ford resided in the house until 1921. Birthplace of Henry Ford II and Benson Ford.
Mary S. Smith House			8445 East Jefferson Ave.	Neo-Renaissance		
Frederick K. Stearns House		1902	8109 East Jefferson Ave.	Tudor Revival	Stratton & Baldwin	
Detroit Waldorf School		1913	2555 Burns		Albert Kahn	
Henry L. Walker House		1899	1005 Iroquois	Colonial Revival	Rogers and MacFarlane	

== See also ==
- East Jefferson Avenue Residential TR
- Neighborhoods in Detroit
- Manoogian Mansion (the official residence of the mayor of Detroit, it is located near Indian Village; the home was given to the city in 1966)
