= Bloomfield Hills Country Club =

Golf club in Michigan, United States

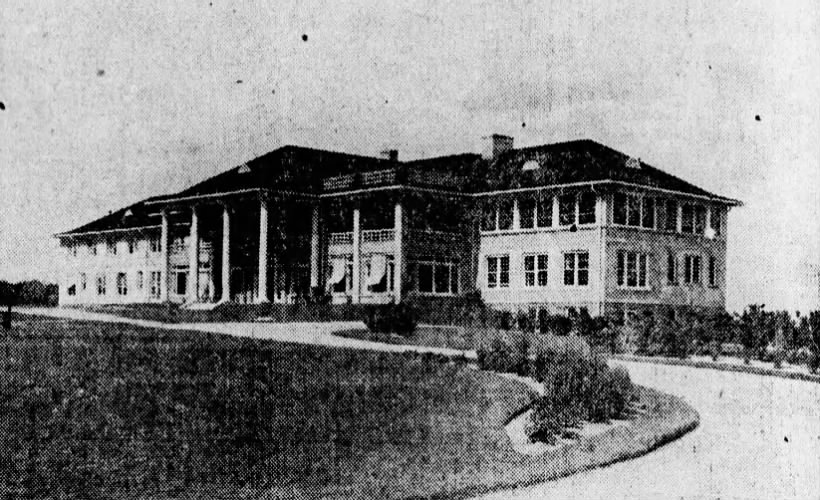
- Interactive map of Bloomfield Hills Country Club
- 42.58745°N 83.23442°W

Club information
- Location: Bloomfield Hills, Oakland County, Michigan, U.S.
- Established: 1909; 117 years ago
- Type: Private
- Tota holes: 18
- Website: bloomfieldhillscc.org

Course
- Designed by: Harry Colt
- Par: 72
- Length: 6,711 yards (6,137 m)
- Course rating: 72.5
- Slope rating: 129

Bloomfield Hills Country Club is a private golf club located in Bloomfield Hills, Michigan, United States. It features an 18-hole course originally designed by Harry Colt in 1913.

== History ==
Bloomfield Hills country club was established in 1909. The privately owned club was organized by influential figures of Detroit's industrial community. Its founders included Colonel Edwin S. George, William T. Barbour, George G. Booth, John C. Donnelly, John T. Shaw, and Charles Stinchfield.

The property, then called the Knight farm, was acquired from Lester E. Wise for $12,500 in June 1909. It was established on one of the highest elevations in the Bloomfield Hills section of Oakland County in Michigan. The Bloomfield Hills Country Club commissioned Tom Bendelow to create a golf course. The original layout, a links course, opened in October 1910. It marked the first golf and country club to operate north of Detroit.

Upon adding 50 acres, the club turned to Harry Colt to create a redesigned and larger course. The design of the Bloomfield Hills course was completed by Colt in 1912. It was Colt's only solo golf course design in the United States.

The formal opening of the members-only Bloomfield Hills Country Golf Club was held on May 17, 1913. The original clubhouse was a small white frame building. By the end of 1914, enlargement and improvement plans for the club house were drawn up by Chittenden & Kotting. The Slater Construction Company of Pontiac received the general contract in December 1914. The 141-acre course opened on July 1, 1915, with the expanded clubhouse following on July 17. The new structure was four times larger than the original, measuring 217 feet by 86 feet.

By 1940, among the country club's members were automotive industry elites such as William S. Knudsen, the Ford family, and the Fisher family.

Improvements to the course were carried out by Robert Trent Jones, Sr. in 1968 and 1978, followed by work from Arthur Hills in 1981. In 2017, the club retained Mike DeVries and Frank Pont to create a long-term development plan for the course, with a restoration project completed by them in 2020.
