= High and Locust Streets Historic District =

Historic district in New York, United States

- U.S. National Register of Historic Places
- U.S. Historic district
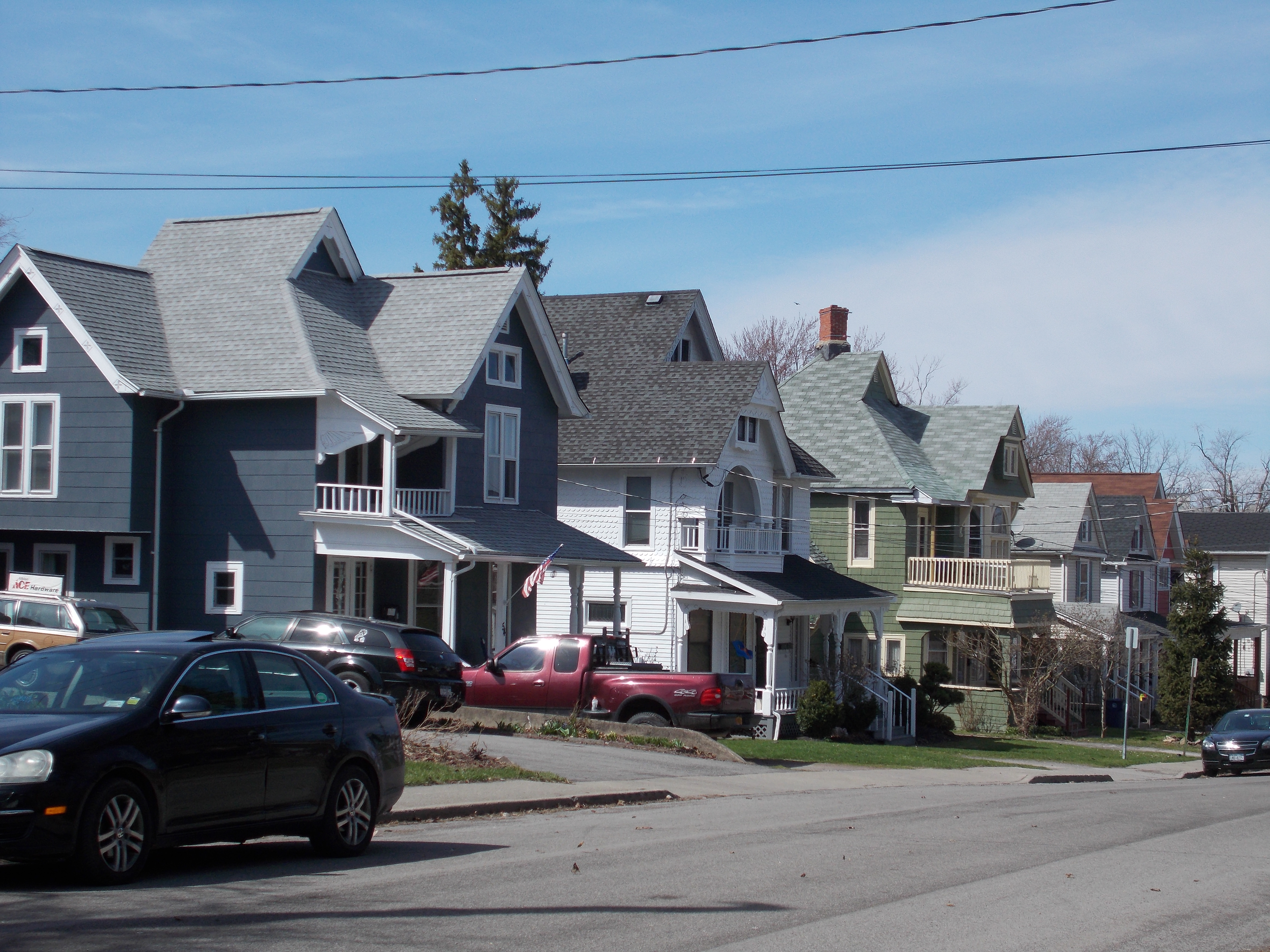
- Park Place, High and Locust Streets Historic District, April 2015

- Location within New York Location within the United States
- Location: 23-54 Park Pl., 143-399 High, 119-224 Locust & 23-43 Spalding Sts., Lockport, New York
- Coordinates: 43°09′51″N 78°41′16″W
- Area: 39.25 acres (15.88 ha)
- Built: c. 1840-1936
- Architectural style: Greek Revival, Italianate, Queen Anne, Colonial Revival, Classical Revival, Bungalow/craftsman
- NRHP reference No.: 14000937
- Added to NRHP: November 19, 2014

High and Locust Streets Historic District is a national historic district located in Lockport in Niagara County, New York. The district includes 120 contributing buildings in a predominantly residential area of the city. The district developed between about 1840 and 1936, and includes buildings in a variety of architectural styles, including Greek Revival, Italianate, Queen Anne, Colonial Revival, Classical Revival, and Bungalow / American Craftsman. Located in the district are the separately listed Chase-Crowley-Keep House, Chase-Hubbard-Williams House, and Thomas Oliver House. Other notable buildings include the F.N. Nelson House (c. 1850), Calvin Haines/Alonzo J. Mansfield House (c. 1860), J. Dunville House (c. 1907), Ambrose S. Beverly House (c. 1875), Dr. Martin S. Kittinger House (c. 1870), and F. N. Nelson House/Lockport Home for the Friendless (c. 1850).

It was listed on the National Register of Historic Places in 2014.
