= Block scheduling =

Type of organization of school classes

Block scheduling or blocking is a type of academic scheduling used in some schools in the American K-12 system, in which students have fewer but longer classes per day than in a traditional academic schedule. It is more common in middle and high schools than in primary schools. In one form of block scheduling, a single class will meet every day for a number of days, after which another class will take its place. In another form, daily classes rotate through a changing daily cycle.

Blocks offer more concentrated experiences of subjects, with fewer, usually half as many if going through a schedule transfer, classes daily.

== Description ==
Under a traditional American schedule, pupils in a high school will study seven subjects a day for 45 minutes for each day of the week for a semester. There will be two semesters in the year so 14 subjects could be studied. Some pupils will not study all seven subjects. There was great variety as each school board was free to decide the requirement.

Traditional Scheduling
Time	Semester 1	Semester 2
Before 09:45	Sports training some electives
09:45 – 10:30	Government	Economics
10:30 – 11:15	French	French
11:15 – 12:00	Geometry	Geometry
12:00 – 13:00	Lunch
13:00 – 13:45	Computing 1	Computing 2
13:45 – 14:30	Biology	Biology
14:30 – 15:15	English	English
15:15 – 16:00	PE	PE

== Schedules ==
Many forms of block scheduling were devised.

=== Alternate day block scheduling ===
Also referred to as A/B block scheduling, Odd/Even block scheduling, or Day 1/Day 2 block scheduling. Students take three to four courses, around 90–120 minutes in length, per day all year long on alternating days resulting in a full six or eight courses per year.

=== 4x4 block scheduling ===
Students take four courses, around 90 minutes in length, every day for the first semester and take four different courses every day for the second semester. This results in a full eight courses taken per year.

=== Waldorf blocking ===
Waldorf schools traditionally employ a mixed approach. Certain academic subjects are taught in intensive three to five week blocks known as main lesson blocks, while other subjects are taught in regularly meeting skills classes.

== Effectiveness ==
"Where we were able to combine data to produce summary effect sizes, we found that 4 x 4 block scheduling resulted in higher cross subject achievement than traditional schedules. However, the outcome average cross-subject achievement could conceal worsening performance in some subjects and better performance in others."

A systematic review on Block Scheduling was also conducted by Dickson et al. (2010) at the EPPI-Centre which asserts that there is no conclusive evidence to support the introduction of policy guidance on the use of block scheduling in secondary schools in the UK. Although the findings do not indicate that participating in block schedules would produce negative outcomes for pupils across subjects, neither are the positive effects of block scheduling strong enough to recommend their implementation.

== Criticism ==
Some critics believe that certain subjects suffer from a lack of daily exposure to subject matter and practice that occurs with an A/B block schedule. Courses like mathematics, foreign languages, and music may benefit from daily practice and suffer from a lack thereof.

A University of Virginia study of 8,000 college students found that students who had block scheduling in high school performed worse in university science courses.

Some students are better able to manage their time with nightly homework in every class, while other students do better with larger homework assignments that are spaced out over several days. Some subjects may benefit from daily drills while other subjects may lend themselves to less frequent homework projects. Mid-term transfers between schools with different schedules can be problematic in cases where the schedules are different.

== See also ==
- Academic term
- Modular scheduling
