= Sunbridge Institute =

Coordinates: 41.08334°N 74.06330°W

Sunbridge Institute (formerly Sunbridge College) is a non-profit adult learning center located in Chestnut Ridge, New York. The institute specializes in teacher training for Waldorf education, inspired by anthroposophy. Sunbridge is a full member of the Association of Waldorf Schools of North American (AWSNA) and the Waldorf Early Childhood Association of North America (WECAN) and is a partner of SUNY Empire State University.

Offerings include:

- Waldorf Early Childhood, Elementary, and High School Teacher Education diploma programs (13-week, low-residency, in-person/online programs held over the course of 25 months)
- Waldorf Elementary Music and World Languages & Cultures Teacher Education certificate programs (3-week, in-person programs)
- Online/in-person professional development and introductory courses and workshops on aspects of Waldorf education and teaching, held throughout the year and as part of Sunbridge's Summer Series.

== History ==
The oldest existing Waldorf teacher education center in North America, Sunbridge was created in 1967 as The Waldorf Institute at the Detroit Waldorf School in Detroit, Michigan. In 1986 The Waldorf Institute moved to Chestnut Ridge; it was chartered and accredited by the State of New York under the name Sunbridge College in 1991. In 2010, Sunbridge ceased offering master's degrees and became licensed as Sunbridge Institute. Under the terms of its partnership with Empire State University of the State University of New York, Sunbridge Early Childhood, Elementary, and High School Teacher Education program students and graduates who enroll in SUNY Empire's Master of Education in Curriculum and Instruction program or its Master of Arts in Liberal Studies program will be awarded 12 credits upon documentation of their Sunbridge diploma, thereby earning the full elective credit requirement for a self-designed concentration in Waldorf Education toward their MEd or MALS degree.

== Location ==
Sunbridge Institute is located in New York's Lower Hudson Valley, about 40 minutes from New York City. It is housed on the campus of the Threefold Educational Center, sharing a community with many other organizations including Green Meadow Waldorf School, Eurythmy Spring Valley, and the Pfeiffer Center for biodynamic agriculture also working out of the philosophies and teachings of Rudolf Steiner.
