= Thomas Oliver House =

Historic house in New York, United States

- U.S. National Register of Historic Places
- U.S. Historic district – Contributing property
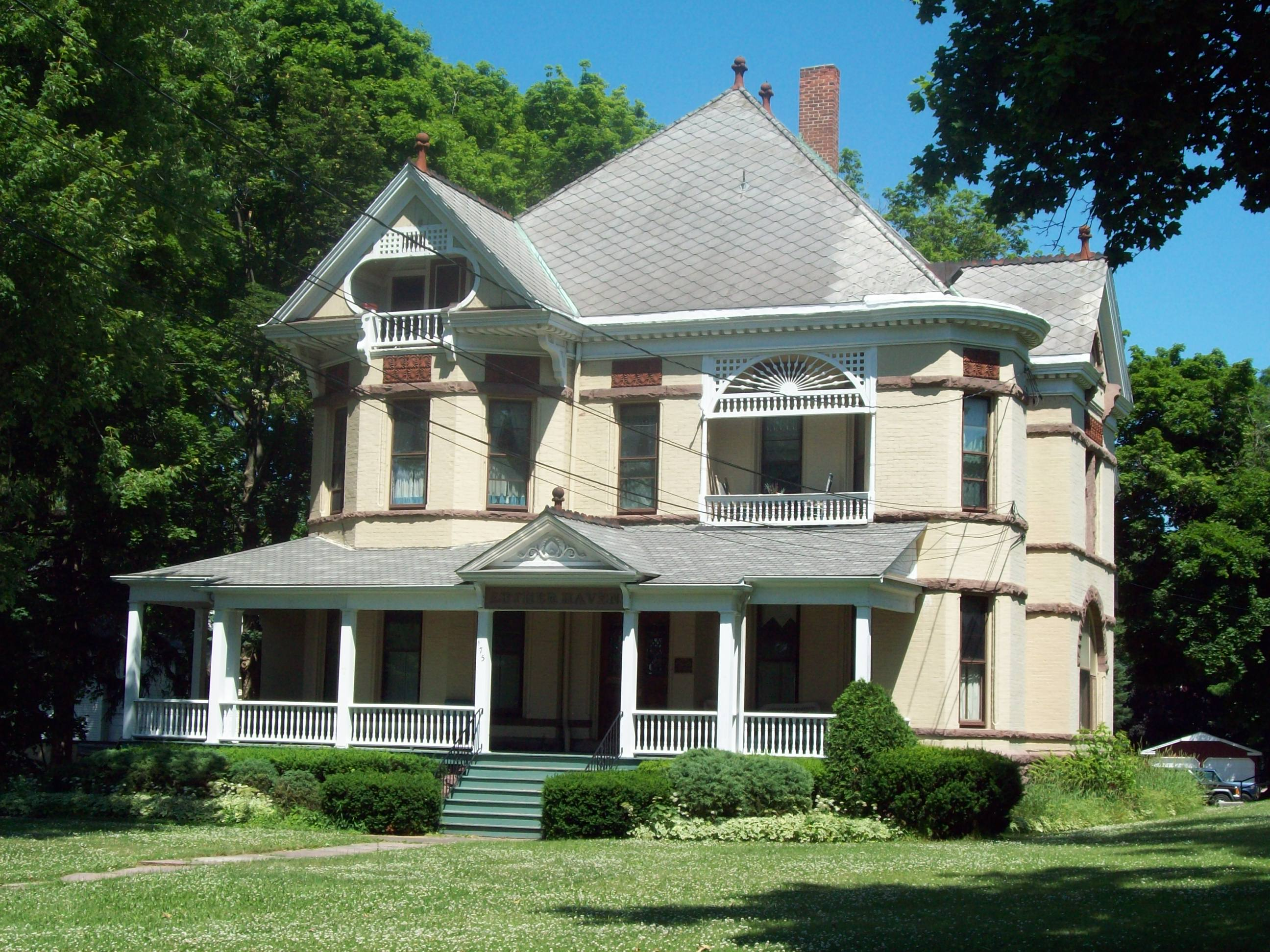
- Thomas Oliver House, June 2009

- Location within New York Location within the United States
- Location: 175 Locust St., Lockport, New York
- Coordinates: 43°9′56″N 78°40′32″W
- Area: less than one acre
- Built: 1892
- Architectural style: Queen Anne
- NRHP reference No.: 98001390
- Added to NRHP: November 19, 1998

Thomas Oliver House is a historic home located at Lockport in Niagara County, New York. It is a 2 1/2-story Queen Anne style brick dwelling built in 1891.

It was listed on the National Register of Historic Places in 1998. It is located in the High and Locust Streets Historic District.
