= Rudolf Steiner Fellowship Foundation =

Foundation created by young anthroposophists

The Rudolf Steiner Fellowship Foundation (also the Fellowship Community, or the Fellowship) was founded in 1966 by a group of young anthroposophists with a goal to care for the elderly.

== History and Community ==
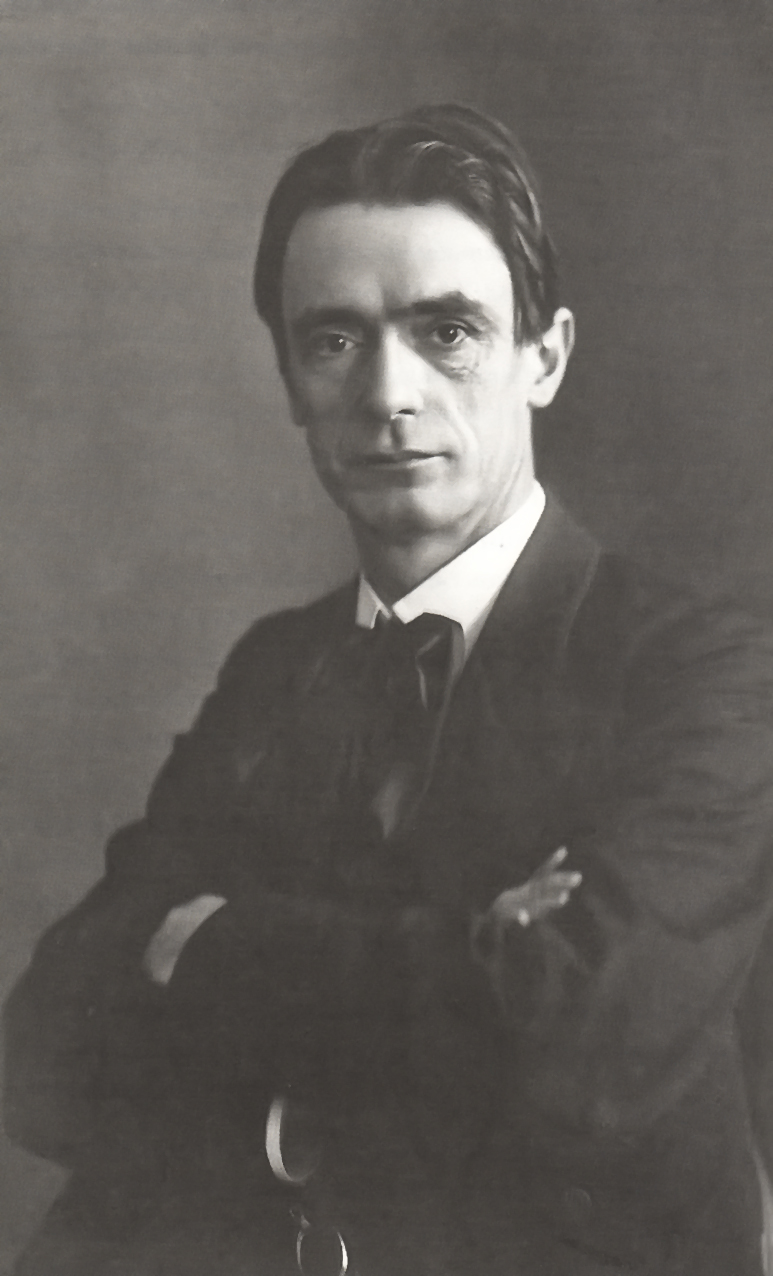
Rudolf Steiner, founder of anthroposophy and Waldorf schools

In the mid-1950s, a group of interested individuals came to Christoph Lindner, a former official physician at the Swiss Consulate in New York City and a member of the Swiss Benevolent Association, to form the Fellowship Committee within the Anthroposophical Society of America. The committee came into being for the needs of some elderly members. This was the initiative that led to the Fellowship Community. After Paul Scharff took the helm, the Fellowship Community was created in 1966 in Spring Valley, New York. Soon after, the Fellowship, having grown, began to support Weleda financially, becoming a shareholder.

Dr. Paul Scharff died in 2014 at the age of 83, but the Fellowship is still strong. The Fellowship is now a long-term care community. With more than 150 members, children and co-workers, the Fellowship Community is in a rural setting of farm, orchards, and forests only 45 minutes by public transportation to New York City. It has a candle shop, a homeopathic and alternative medical office, now headed by Dr. Gerald Karnow, M.D., a weavery, a woodworking-shop, and a metal-shop. The Community is "A rich, varied cultural-spiritual life is woven into the community with festivals, art programs, lectures and trips. There is much work (play for the child) and social interaction, allowing for growth and human unfolding."

The larger community includes the Green Meadow Waldorf School.

=== Duryea Farm ===
The Fellowship Community operates the Duryea farm, an organic and biodynamic farm. With a small herd of about eight Jersey cows, as well as sheep, chickens and honeybees, ten acres of vegetables, 250 apple trees, and thirty acres of pasture and hay fields, the farm produces much of the Fellowship's food. The farm is also home to one of the two off-campus kindergartens from Green Meadow Waldorf School. Here the children feed the chickens, sing songs, and grow pumpkins.

When Jean Durier (‘’’Duryea’’’, in all its different spellings, means "dwelling by the river,") came to the United States from France in 1688, he bought land where the Duryea farm now is. Eight generations later, John Howard Duryea (b. 1939) sold the thirty-three acres of farm to the growing Fellowship Community. At the time it was the only organic farm in Rockland County.

=== The Hand and Hoe ===
Selling freshly made pizza, bread, soup, and cookies, freshly harvested vegetables, ice cream, and hand made gifts and crystals, the Hand and Hoe is open every Friday afternoon from noon till five.

=== The Mercury Press ===
The Mercury Press, started in the 1970s, is a small publishing and print house at the Fellowship. They publish many of Rudolf Steiner's significant lectures, translated from German and printed in English.

=== The Otto Specht School ===
The Otto Specht School logo

The Fellowship Community also is home to the Otto Specht School. The school, with a student-to-teacher ratio of five to one, was founded for "difficult" students "with developmental delays, learning differences, alternative learning styles, and sensory and social sensitivities."

The school takes its name from Dr. Otto Specht, a pupil of Rudolf Steiner, who, with his numerous learning differences, was considered "uneducatable". With the careful guidance of Steiner, carefully formed lessons that focused mainly on limb activity. After just two years of hard work, Specht was on average grade levels and able to enter a school. With more guidance, he finished school and became a medical doctor.

== More Reading ==
Diane and Robert Gilman (Summer 1984) Waldorf Education; Looking into the educational system developed by Rudolf Steiner; An Interview With Caroline Ostheimer In Context; The Way of Learning (Context Institute) Summer 1984, Issue 6

Eleanor Zimmerman, et al. (Winter 2013) Working to Serve Others at the Fellowship Community Lilipoh Winter 2013: Redemption of Labor - Issue #70, Vol. 18
