= Chase-Hubbard-Williams House =

Historic house in New York, United States

- U.S. National Register of Historic Places
- U.S. Historic district – Contributing property
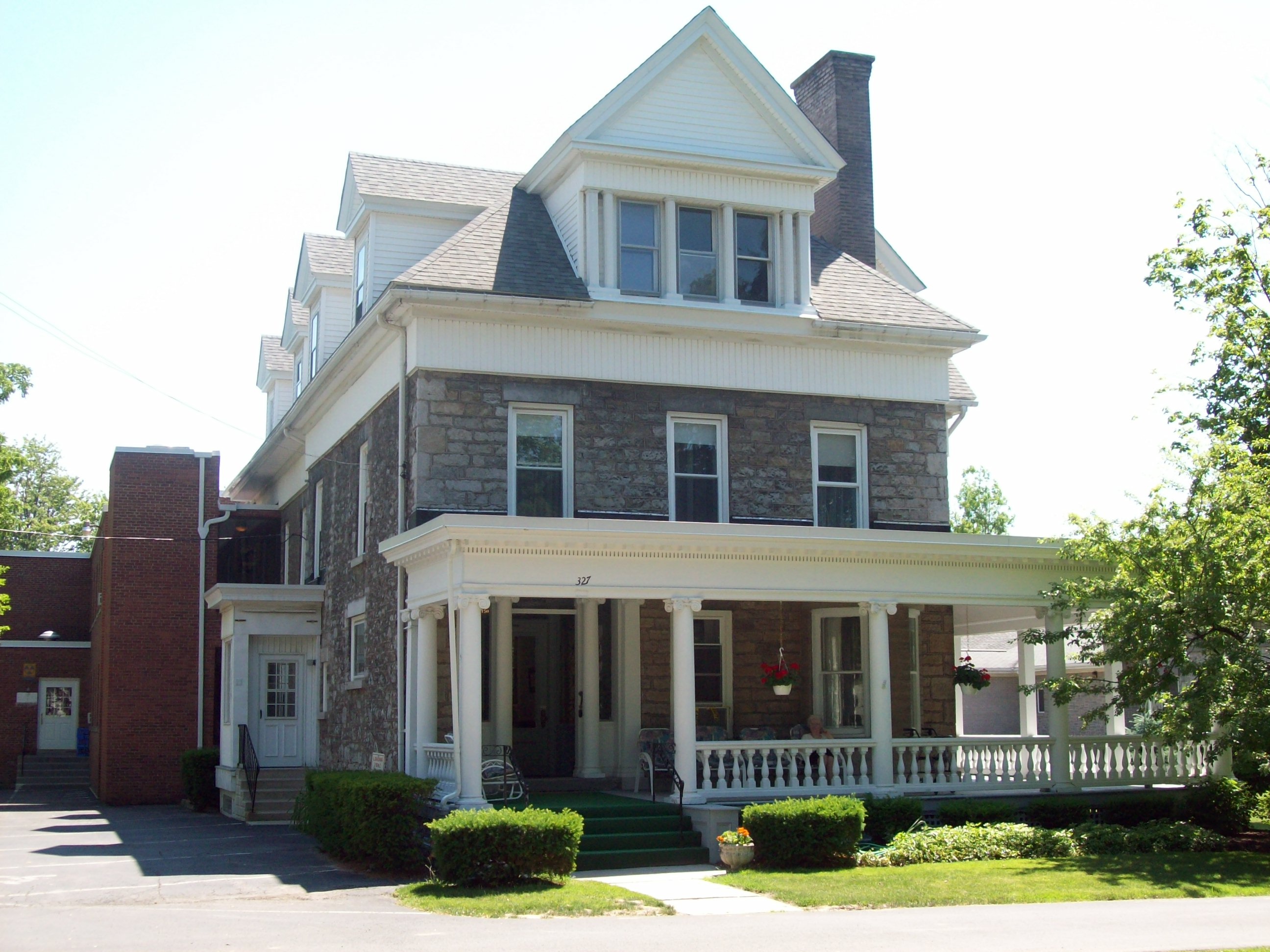
- Chase-Hubbard-Williams House, June 2009

- Location within New York Location within the United States
- Interactive map showing the location of Chase-Hubbard-Williams House
- Location: 327 High St., Lockport, New York
- Coordinates: 43°9′57″N 78°41′0″W
- Area: 1 acre (0.40 ha)
- Built: 1870
- Architectural style: Colonial Revival
- MPS: Stone Buildings of Lockport, New York MPS
- NRHP reference No.: 08000452
- Added to NRHP: May 21, 2008

Chase-Hubbard-Williams House is a historic home located at Lockport in Niagara County, New York. It is a stone structure built in 1870 in the Italianate style. A 1900 remodeling was in the Colonial Revival style. In 1958, the property was acquired by the Presbytery of Buffalo and Niagara and converted to a nursing home. It is one of approximately 75 stone residences remaining in the city of Lockport.

It was listed on the National Register of Historic Places in 2008. It is located in the High and Locust Streets Historic District.
