= Green Meadow Waldorf School =

Coordinates: 41°04′55″N 74°03′41″W

Location
- 307 Hungry Hollow Rd; Chestnut Ridge, New York 10977-6329; United States

Information
- Type: Private, Waldorf school
- Established: 1950
- CEEB code: 335316
- Administrator: Laura Radefeld
- Faculty: 35.9 (2019-2020)
- Enrollment: 310 (2019-2020)
- Student to teacher ratio: 8.3:1 (2019-2020)
- Campus: Suburban
- Campus size: 11 acres (4.5 ha)
- Accreditation: New York State Association of Independent Schools, Association of Waldorf Schools of North America
- Website: gmws.org

Green Meadow Waldorf School (GMWS) is an independent Waldorf school located in Chestnut Ridge, Rockland County, New York. It offers parent and child classes, and nursery/kindergarten through 12th grades. The school is accredited by both the New York State Association of Independent Schools and the Association of Waldorf Schools of North America. Founded in 1950, it is one of the oldest of the approximately 190 independent North American Waldorf schools (there are about 1,000 such schools worldwide).

== Curriculum ==
The school practices an interdisciplinary approach based on the Waldorf curriculum, including a strong emphasis on art, music and intercultural understanding; students begin studying two foreign languages (Spanish and German) beginning in first grade. It also provides a strong community service program. Graduates of the school have been noted for their independence, sensitivity and creativity.

== Notable alumni ==
- author Kate Christensen (class of 1980)
- filmmaker Stefan Schaefer
- cult leader Keith Raniere

== Larger community ==
Green Meadow is part of the Threefold Educational Foundation anthroposophical community in Chestnut Ridge. The Foundation owns the land and acts as an umbrella for Green Meadow Walfdorf School and several other nearby organizations. This community includes:

- The Threefold Foundation, which acts as trustee of the land and provides affordable housing for community members.
- Sunbridge Institute, a Waldorf teacher training institution.
- The Fellowship Community is a licensed State of New York adult care facility and an inter-generational, anthroposophically based community where people of all ages live with, assist, and care for the elderly. Here, Green Meadow pupils receive hands-on experiences of farming and gardening.
- The Pfeiffer Center, a training center for biodynamic agriculture.
- Eurythmy Spring Valley, a eurythmy school of performance art.
- The Hungry Hollow Food Co-op, a natural food store founded by Green Meadow Waldorf School parents in 1973 and specializing in organic foods.

== Legal controversy ==
During a 2019 measles epidemic, Rockland County excluded unvaccinated students from schools. A lawsuit was filed on behalf of the families of excluded children; in the decision, Judge Thorsen wrote that "petitioners' children are hereby permitted to return to their respective schools forthwith and otherwise assemble in public places", allowing Green Meadow Waldorf School to welcome 45 unvaccinated students back to class.

== Sexual abuse scandal ==
In July 2013, alumna and novelist Kate Christensen published Blue Plate Special, an autobiography in which she describes how she had been sexually abused by a teacher she referred to as "Tomcat". Staff of Green Meadow Waldorf School identified Tomcat as John Alexandra, a former teacher employed between 1965 and 1979, Threefold Board member from 1975 through 1983 and who continued to appear on campus occasionally until 2013. The school hired a professional firm, T&M Protection Resources, to investigate the matter and the results were reported on July 11, 2014 in The Journal News.

== See also ==
- Curriculum of the Waldorf schools

== Additional articles ==
- Third-graders make prayer flags for Bhutanese school, Rockland Journal News, June 13, 2007
- Learning English as a second language at Chestnut Ridge school, Rockland Journal News, April 13, 2007
- "Immigrants Share Some Personal Accounts with Green Meadow Students", Rockland County Times, June 1–7, 2006. pp. 1–2.
