= Chestnut Ridge, New York =

Chestnut Ridge
- Village
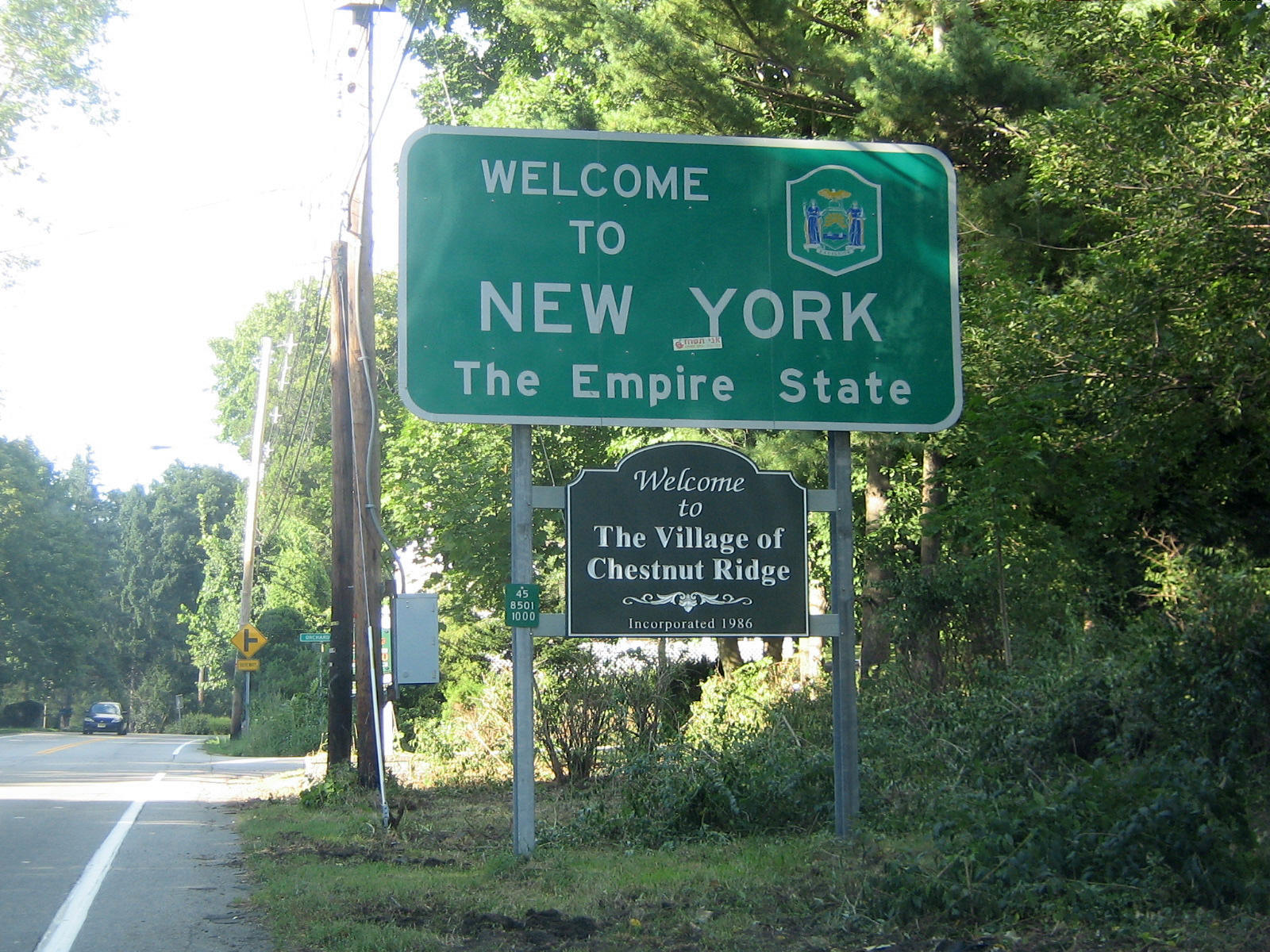

- Location in Rockland County and the state of New York.

- Location within the state of New York
- Coordinates: 41°4′55″N 74°3′5″W
- Country: United States
- State: New York
- County: Rockland
- Town: Ramapo
- Incorporated: May 16, 1986

Government
  - Mayor: Rosario Presti, Jr.
  - Deputy Mayor: Chaim Rose
  - Trustees: Avrohom (Shmuli) Fromovitz Grant Valentine Paul Van Alstyne

Area
  - Total: 4.95 sq mi (12.83 km^{2})
  - Land: 4.95 sq mi (12.82 km^{2})
  - Water: 0.0039 sq mi (0.01 km^{2})
- Elevation: 413 ft (126 m)

Population (2020)
  - Total: 10,505
  - Estimate (2025): 10,987 ▲
  - Density: 2,220/sq mi (860/km^{2})
- Time zone: UTC-05:00 (Eastern (EST))
  - Summer (DST): UTC-04:00 (EDT)
- ZIP Codes: 10952, 10965, 10977
- Area code: 845
- FIPS code: 36-15400
- GNIS feature ID: 0979942
- Website: www.chestnutridgevillage.org

Chestnut Ridge is a village in the town of Ramapo, Rockland County, New York, United States, located north of the state of New Jersey, east of Airmont, south of Spring Valley, and west of Nanuet. The population was 10,505 at the 2020 census.

Chestnut Ridge was incorporated in 1986. Prior to 1986, Chestnut Ridge was an unincorporated area within the town of Ramapo often referred to as "South Spring Valley" (its fire district), as many postal addresses carried the Spring Valley designation. In April 2020, mayor Rosario Presti appointed Chaim Rose to fill a vacancy on the village board of trustees; Rose thus became the first Hasidic member of the board since the village was incorporated in 1986.

== Geography ==
According to the United States Census Bureau, the village has a total area of 4.9 square miles (13 km^{2}), all land.

== Demographics ==
Historical population
Census	Pop.	Note	%±
1990	7,517		—
2000	7,829		4.2%
2010	7,916		1.1%
2020	10,505		32.7%
2025 (est.)	10,987		4.6%
U.S. Decennial Census

=== 2020 census ===
As of the 2020 census, Chestnut Ridge had a population of 10,505. The median age was 29.3 years. 39.1% of residents were under the age of 18 and 14.8% of residents were 65 years of age or older. For every 100 females, there were 98.6 males, and for every 100 females age 18 and over, there were 93.9 males age 18 and over.

100.0% of residents lived in urban areas, while 0.0% lived in rural areas.

There were 2,633 households in Chestnut Ridge, of which 44.1% had children under the age of 18 living in them. Of all households, 65.5% were married-couple households, 11.6% were households with a male householder and no spouse or partner present, and 20.3% were households with a female householder and no spouse or partner present. About 18.3% of all households were made up of individuals and 12.4% had someone living alone who was 65 years of age or older.

There were 2,780 housing units, of which 5.3% were vacant. The homeowner vacancy rate was 1.4% and the rental vacancy rate was 6.6%.

Racial composition as of the 2020 census
Race	Number	Percent
White	7,688	73.2%
Black or African American	1,020	9.7%
American Indian and Alaska Native	44	0.4%
Asian	445	4.2%
Native Hawaiian and Other Pacific Islander	10	0.1%
Some other race	695	6.6%
Two or more races	603	5.7%
Hispanic or Latino (of any race)	1,030	9.8%

=== Demographic estimates ===
According to an earlier Census Bureau estimate, the village had 2,107 families, a population density of 1,584.6 inhabitants per square mile (611.8/km^{2}), and a housing-unit density of 526.4 per square mile (203.2/km^{2}).

The same estimate reported that 17.4% of households were non-families. The average household size was 2.87 and the average family size was 3.12.

It also reported that 5.8% of residents were from 18 to 24, 27.0% were from 25 to 44, and 29.1% were from 45 to 64.

The village has seen an influx of Haredi Jews in recent years.

=== Income and poverty ===
The median income for a household in the village was $86,468, and the median income for a family was $95,551. Males had a median income of $57,420 versus $43,548 for females. The per capita income for the village was $33,227. About 0.9% of families and 3.5% of the population were below the poverty line, including 0.3% of those under age 18 and 5.0% of those age 65 or over.

== Tourism ==
=== Historical markers ===
- Haring Homestead, 606 S. Pascack Road

=== Landmarks and places of interest ===
- Duryea Farm of the Fellowship Community - 101 Ackertown Road. The farm was founded in 1883. Beginning in 1960, the Duryeas invited the public to the harvest. The farm is now owned and operated by the Rudolf Steiner Fellowship Foundation, which converted the orchards and gardens to produce biodynamic organic fruits and vegetables.
- Little Red Schoolhouse Museum - 50 Schoolhouse Road, east of Route 45. Once a one-room schoolhouse, it is now a museum owned and operated by the east Ramapo Central School District. It was built in 1890 and used until the early 1970s when pre-kindergarten classes were held there.
- Children's Park, located in east Chestnut Ridge. This park contains tennis courts, basketball courts, a play ground with swings, a junior sized baseball field as well as a paths through the woods and open fields for pets.

== Education ==
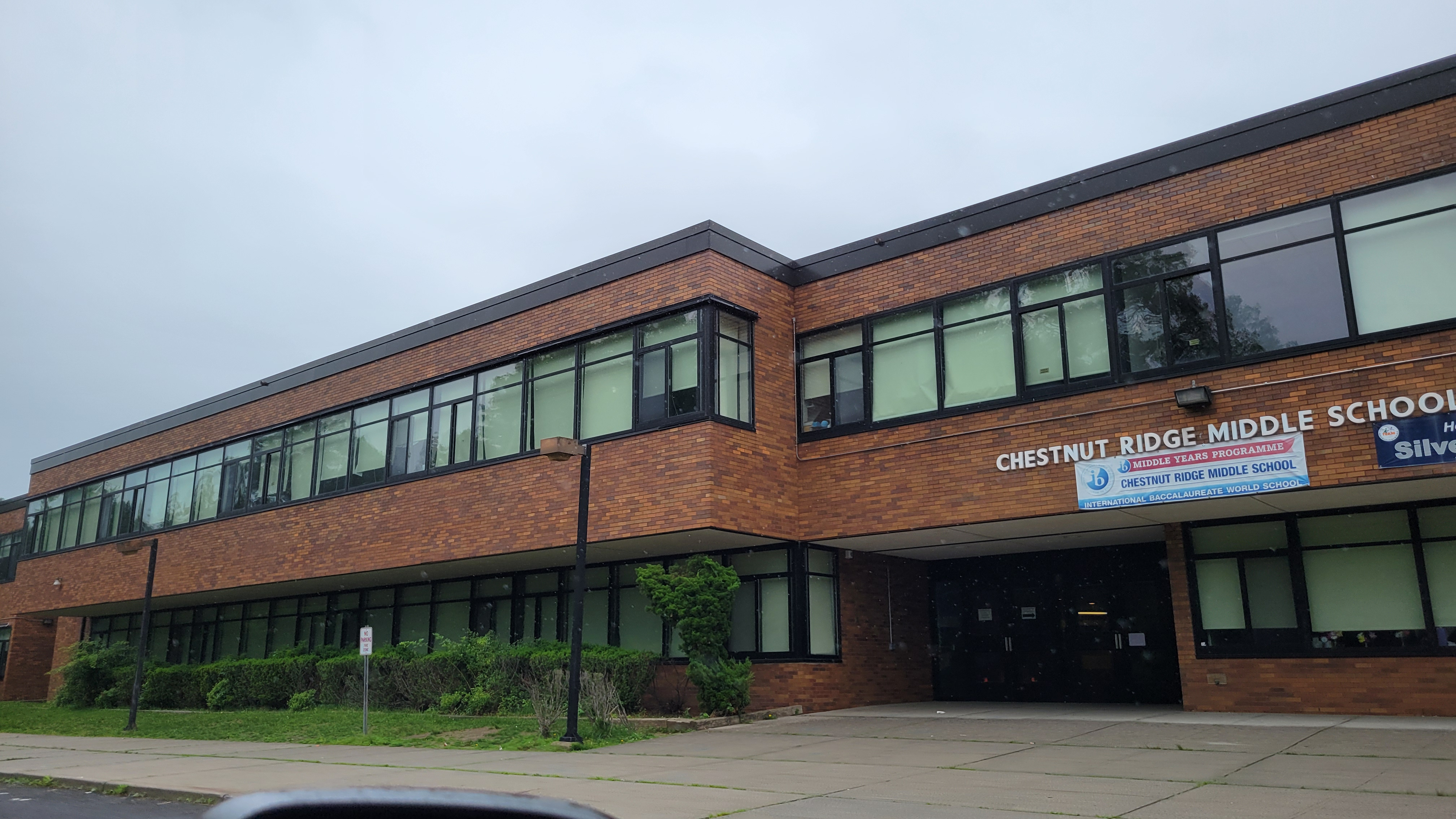
Chestnut Ridge Middle School

Public schools:

- Chestnut Ridge Middle School
- Eldorado Elementary School
- Fleetwood Elementary School
- Margetts Elementary School

Private schools:

- Green Meadow Waldorf School, a pre-kindergarten through 12th grade Waldorf school

Colleges and adult education:

- Sunbridge Institute, a Waldorf teacher training center
- School of Eurythmy, a movement arts training in Eurythmy
- The Pfeiffer Center, a biodynamic gardening and agricultural training center
- The Threefold Educational Center, an educational trust

== Noted employers ==
- LeCroy Corporation, manufacturer of oscilloscopes and other testing gear

== Notable people ==
- Isaiah Ekejiuba (born 1981), former NFL football player
- Daniel Ribeiro (born 1989), former artistic gymnast who is head coach of the Illinois Fighting Illini men's gymnastics team
