= Crowley House (Willcox, Arizona) =

- U.S. National Register of Historic Places
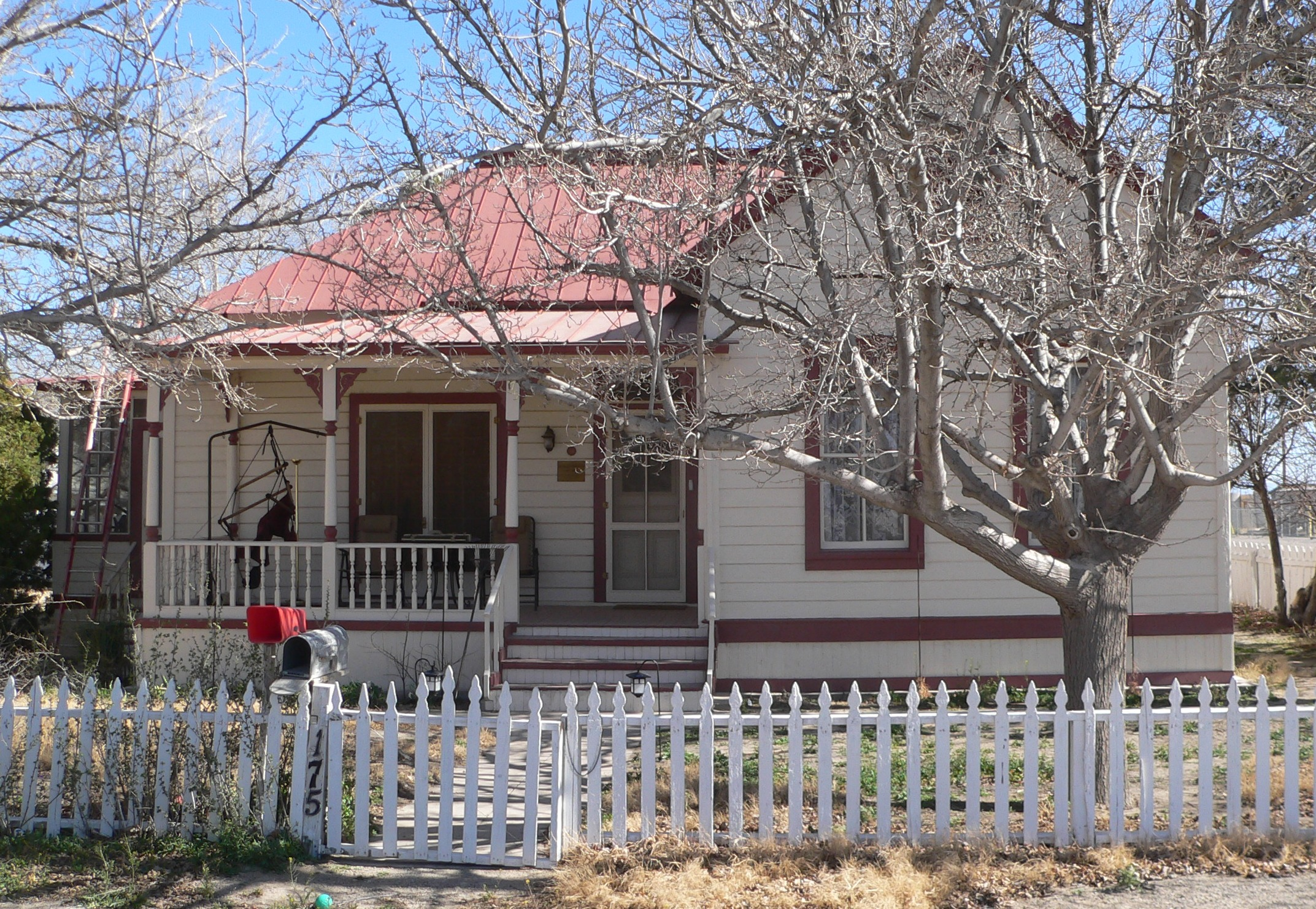
- The house in 2012

- Location within Arizona Location within the United States
- Location: 175 S. Railroad Ave., Willcox, Arizona
- Coordinates: 32°15′02″N 109°49′51″W
- NRHP reference No.: 87000748
- Added to NRHP: August 6, 1987

The Crowley House is an historic structure located at 175 S. Railroad Avenue in Willcox, Arizona. It is the oldest house in the oldest residential area of Willcox. Constructed circa 1883 of redwood, which was rare in the area, this is the only house built of the material.

== John Crowley ==
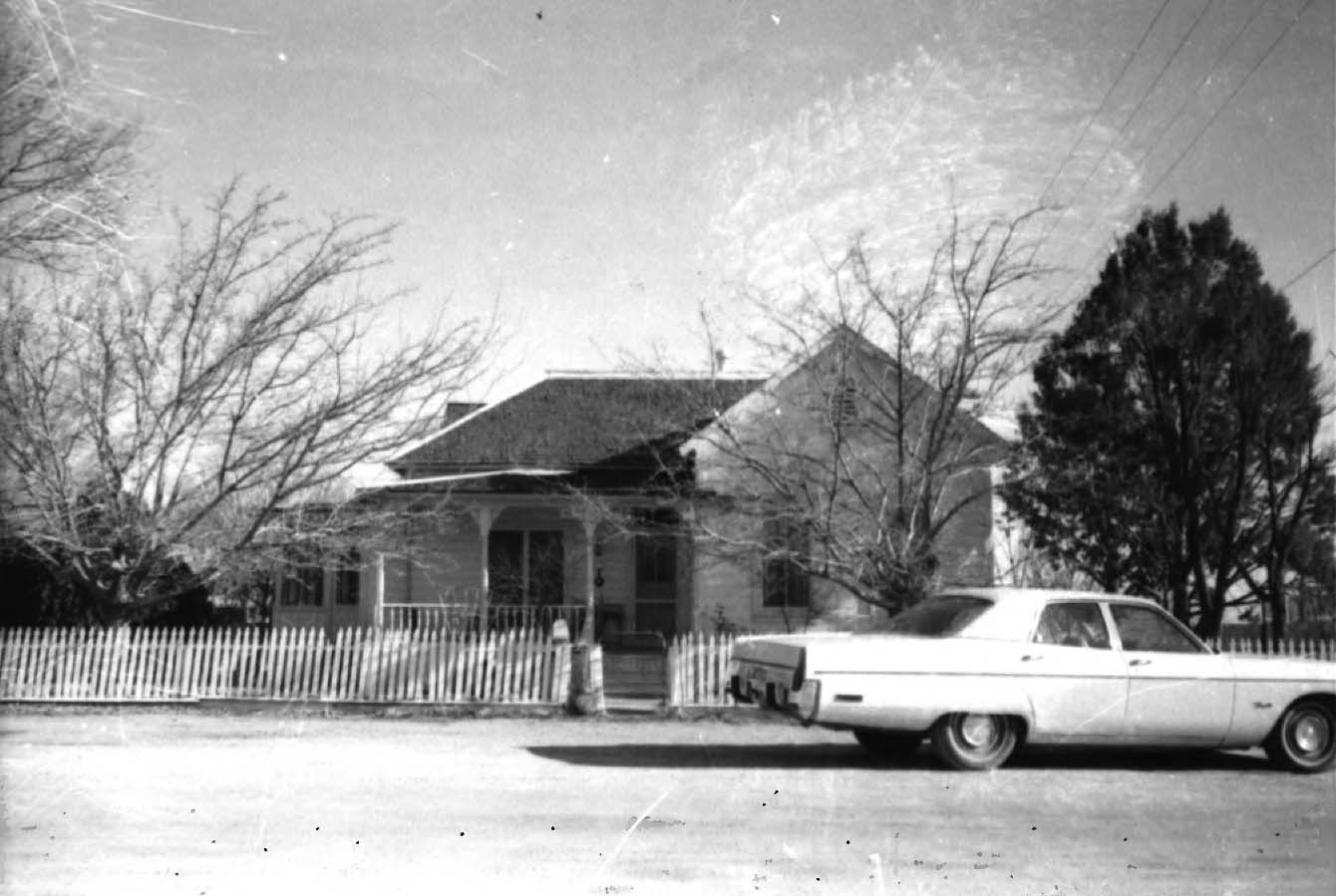
Crowley House, 1986

John F. Crowley was from San Francisco, California, where he worked for a livery stable as a collector, as well as being a foreman for the United Carriage Company. In 1883 he relocated to Willcox with his family, and opened up a liquor store. Later that year he became the sheriff in nearby Bisbee. In December of that year, five men robbed a store in Bisbee, killing four innocent bystanders in the process. Crowley brought in two of the five men by himself, Red Sample and Texas Howard, and all five men were hung. A sixth man, who planned the robbery but did not take part, was lynched by the townspeople.

In 1884 Crowley sold his liquor store, and was appointed deputy sheriff in Willcox, under J. L. Ward. At the same time he was also serving as the deputy territorial assessor. When Bob Hatch replaced Ward as sheriff in 1886, Crowley continued to serve as his deputy for the next two years. After leaving the sheriff's office, he worked for the Southern Pacific Railroad from 1888 to 1891, after which he returned to the liquor business. In 1893 he became the general manager of a lumber company, where he remained until 1902. From 1902 until 1912 he served as the U. S. Coroner at Willcox.

In 1900, the Willcox volunteer fire department was organized with Crowley as its first chief. He also held mining investments in the area, including the Juniper Mine. He was also a stockholder in the Willcox Bank and Trust Company, which opened in 1909.

== The house ==
The house is a Queen Anne style house constructed in approximately 1883, by Crowley after he moved to Willcox. It has an L-shaped medium gable roof with a gabled dormer and a central chimney with a metal cap. It has a recessed central entry with a wood door and flat, blind transom, and wooden screen door. It sits on a brick foundation, and has clapboard siding, with corner boards.
