= Chittenden & Kotting =

Chittenden & Kotting was an architectural partnership based in Detroit, Michigan. Founded in 1903 by Alpheus Williams Chittenden (1869-1958) and Charles Kotting (1865-1934). During their 13-year partnership, Chittenden and Kotting worked mostly on residential projects in Detroit's elite neighborhoods such as Indian Village and Grosse Pointe. Two of their residential projects, the Bingley Fales House and the Mary G. Edgar House, both in the Indian Village neighborhood, are recognized in The American Institute of Architects Guide to Detroit Architecture. The pair are also credited with design of several landmark Detroit buildings including the Detroit Boat Club's building on Belle Isle and the Detroit Stove Works building. The partnership dissolved in 1916.
