= Crowley House (North Adams, Massachusetts) =

Historic house in Massachusetts, United States

- U.S. National Register of Historic Places
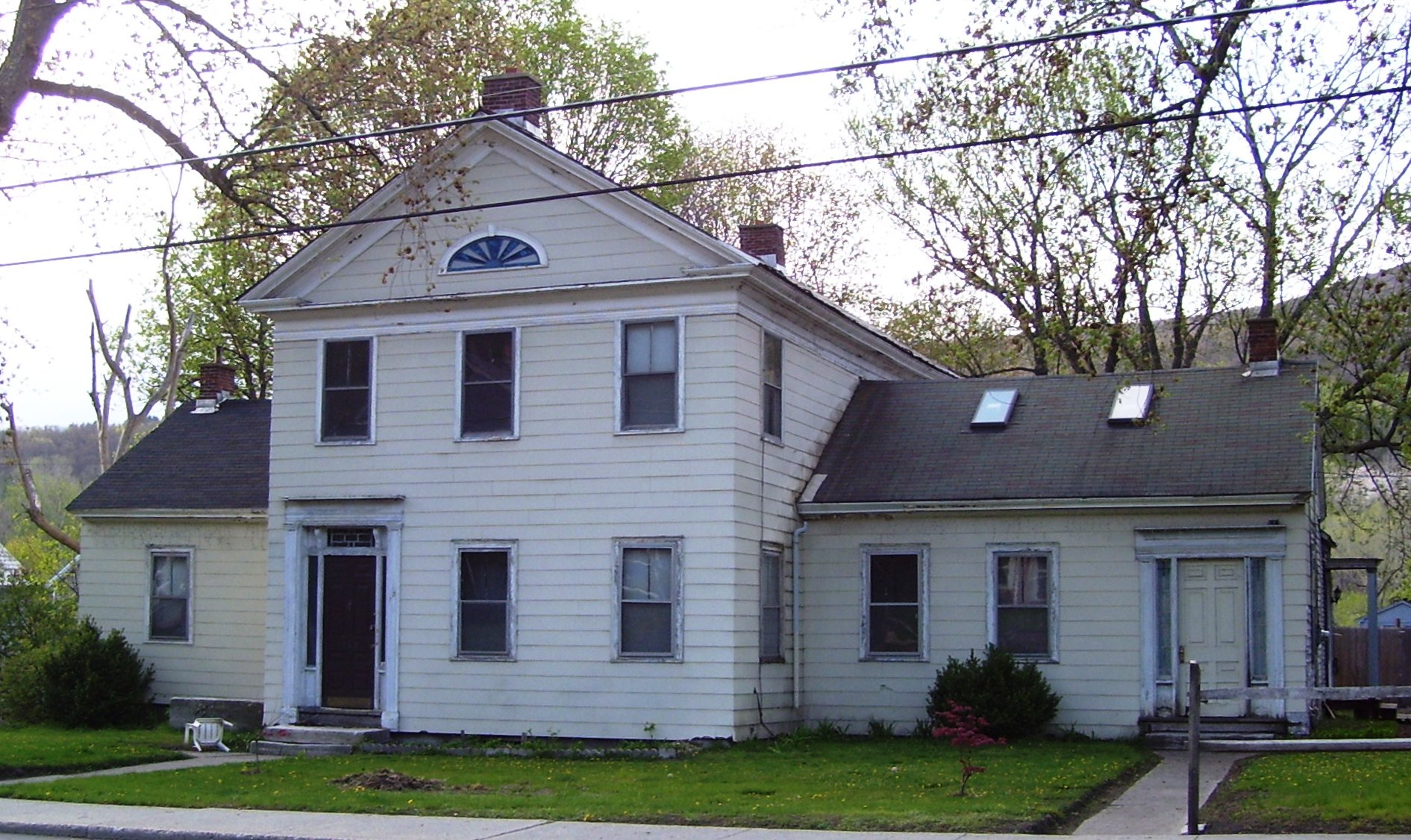
- (2012)

- Location within Massachusetts Location within the United States
- Location: 365 W. Main St., North Adams, Massachusetts
- Coordinates: 42°41′59″N 73°7′40″W
- Built: c. 1830
- Architectural style: Greek Revival, Federal
- MPS: North Adams MRA
- NRHP reference No.: 85003414
- Added to NRHP: October 25, 1985

The Crowley House is a historic house located in North Adams, Massachusetts. It is one a small number of houses in North Adams built in a transitional Federalist-Greek Revival style, and one of its relatively small number of early 19th-century houses. The house was listed on the National Register of Historic Places in 1985.

== Description and history ==
The Crowley House is located in the West End of North Adams on the north side of Main Street (Massachusetts Route 2), just east of Fairgrounds Avenue. It is a 2 1/2-story wood-frame structure, with a front-facing gable roof and two interior end chimneys. The main block is flanked by single-story wings, the left one a single bay wide, and the right one three bays wide. The house follows a fairly typical Greek Revival plan, with a central hall and wings on either side of the main block. The front facade has Greek Revival details, including Doric pilasters and Greek fret molding, but the workmanship of some of the details shows that it was probably done by someone with more practice in the Federal style. The fan in the front gable end is a Federal period feature.

Little is known of its early history; based on its architecture, a construction date of 1830 is estimated. It first enters the documentary record in the 1860s when its owner defaulted on debts and lost the property. It was occupied from the 1880s into the early 20th century by David Crowley, a clothes finisher working in the local textile mills. It is unknown if Crowley occupied the property, and it appears to have had long use as a rental.

== See also ==
- National Register of Historic Places listings in Berkshire County, Massachusetts
