= Chase-Crowley-Keep House =

Historic house in New York, United States

- U.S. National Register of Historic Places
- U.S. Historic district – Contributing property
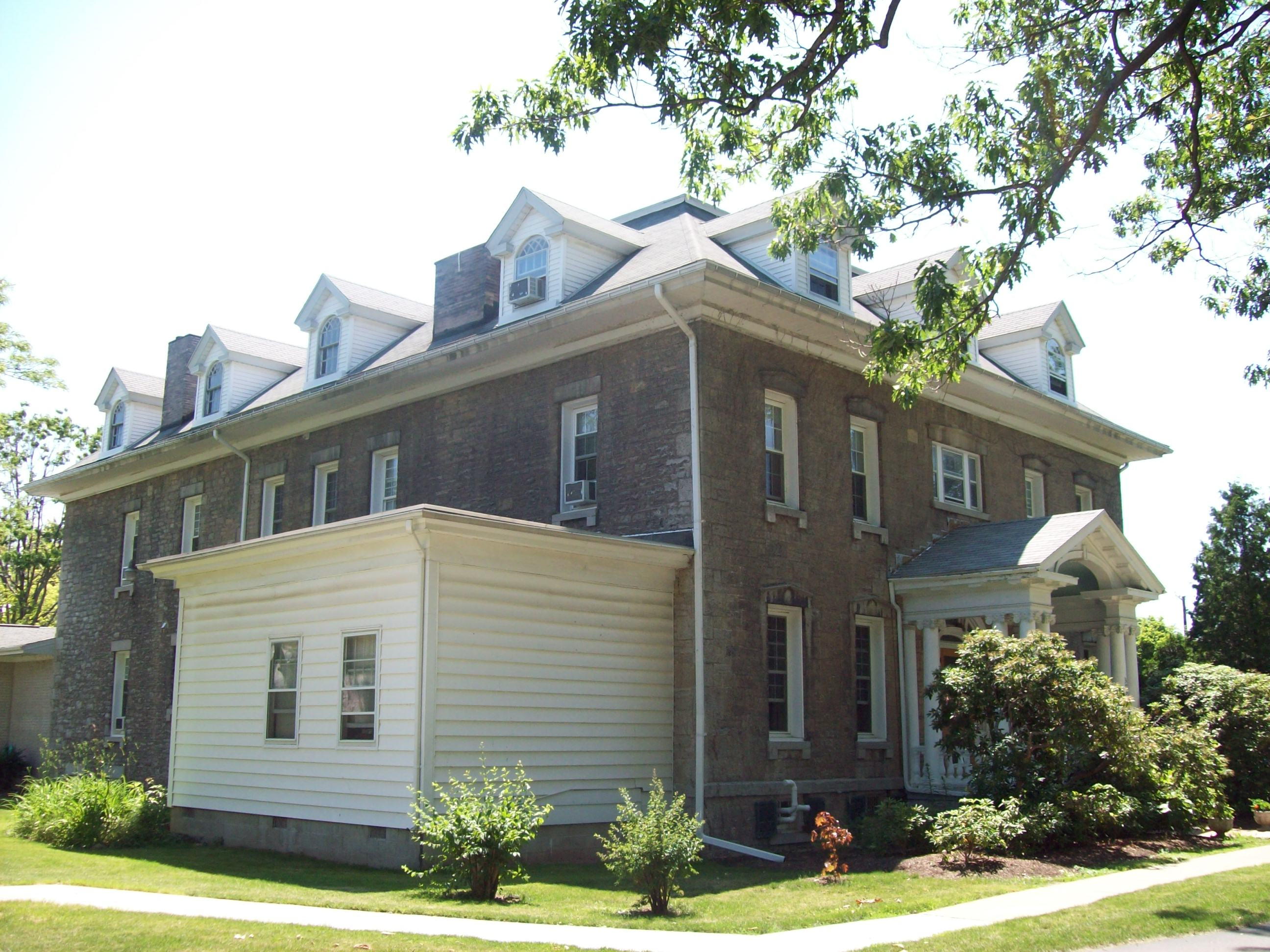
- Chase-Crowley-Keep House, June 2009

- Location within New York Location within the United States
- Interactive map showing the location of Chase-Crowle—Keep House
- Location: 305 High St., Lockport, New York
- Coordinates: 43°9′57″N 78°41′6″W
- Area: 2 acres (0.81 ha)
- Built: 1856
- Architectural style: Italianate, Late 19th And 20th Century Revivals
- MPS: Stone Buildings of Lockport, New York MPS
- NRHP reference No.: 08000451
- Added to NRHP: May 21, 2008

The Chase-Crowley-Keep House is a historic house located at 305 High Street in Lockport, Niagara County, New York.

== Description and history ==
It is a stone structure built in 1856 in the Italianate style. A 1903-1905 remodeling was in the Colonial Revival style. It was built for Edward Ithcar Chase, brother of Supreme Court Justice Salmon P. Chase, who was a frequent visitor. In 1967, the property was converted for use by the Lockport Presbyterian Home as a nursing home. It is one of approximately 75 stone residences remaining in the city of Lockport.

It was listed on the National Register of Historic Places on May 21, 2008. It is in the High and Locust Streets Historic District.
