= Curriculum of the Waldorf schools =

In the curriculum of the Waldorf schools, much of the education in academic subjects takes place in blocks, usually of 3–5 weeks duration. Each pupil generally writes and illustrates a self-created textbook representing the material learned in the block. These blocks are supported by on-going classes in subjects such as music, art and crafts, and foreign languages that continue throughout the year.

== Curricular approach ==
In a Waldorf elementary school, the curriculum is presented through extended "main lessons" which focus on one subject in depth. This approach differs from other instructional approaches that allot equal time to every subject. In a Waldorf elementary school, the approximately two-hour-long main lesson "ties one topic to as many disciplines as possible". The main lesson is not taught from a textbook. The teacher will draw one colored chalk drawing on the board to introduce the theme or subject. The structure of the lesson will include activities that "call upon the child's powers of listening, of body movement, of thinking, and of feeling." These activities could include mental math, hand-clapping games and jumping rope, folk dances, poetry recitation, singing, and writing and drawing in unlined "main lesson books". Teachers are free to include whatever activities they feel will work best for the children in the class.

In high school, students are taught by subject specialists rather than a class teacher. However, the "main lesson" structure remains. The entire curriculum, which is often discussed as an ascending spiral - or "spiral curriculum" - has been described in the following way:

The year progresses with an in-depth study of, say, mathematics, tying it peripherally each day to allied topics- physics, chemistry, home economics, and consumerism – each of which is studied separately in shorter classes later in the day. After a few weeks, one of the peripheral topics becomes the main topic…The result is that all subjects are studied in relation to all other subjects. Students learn what historic events were occurring as Shakespeare wrote Hamlet, what music Newton might have listened to as he made his discoveries…

The presentation of different subjects may be as follows:

== Language, literature, and history ==
In Waldorf education writing and reading are introduced at age six or seven; Beginning with oral storytelling, a Waldorf child listens to and summarizes oral language. Then, using imaginative pictures of sounds (e.g. a snake shape for the letter "s"), the children gradually learn the abstract letter forms and move on to phonetics, spelling, grammar, and punctuation. The literary themes of the first through fourth grades are: fairy tales, fables and saints stories, Hebrew Testament, and Norse mythology. The fifth grade includes a survey of Classical Hindu, Persian, Egyptian, and Greek mythology, as well as the beginnings of Greek history.

In the middle school years, literary themes are drawn from history. Sixth grade includes Roman history, seventh grade, the history of the Medieval period, Renaissance, and Reformation, as well as the voyages of world discovery, and eighth grade focuses on the eighteenth to twentieth centuries, including the major revolutionary movements.

After recording their own stories and illustrations in personal books, children learn to read from the words they wrote themselves. From fourth grade on, creative writing focuses on descriptive writing, poetry, and, in middle school, themes such as wish, wonder, and surprise. In secondary school, courses examine the development of drama, poetry, and the novel. The secondary curriculum generally includes intensive courses focusing on the works of Shakespeare, Dante's Inferno, the Parsifal saga, Goethe's Faust, and the American transcendentalists.

The middle school curriculum examines the local history, building from studies of traditional life in the immediate environment in fourth grade up through successively larger areas (the locality, country, continent). The high school history curriculum includes courses on early civilizations, medieval culture, and modern history, as well as specialized courses in the history of the country in which the school is located.

== Mathematics ==
Formal instruction in numeracy begins at age 6/7 with the four primary operations of arithmetic. Fractions are introduced at age 9/10, decimal numbers and proportions at age 10/11, percentages and rates of interest at age 11/12, algebra at age 12/13. At the secondary level, topics include algebra, geometry, conics, trigonometry, probability, combinatorics and calculus. Descriptive geometry and projective geometry are introduced at age 15/16 and 16/17, respectively.

== Nature and science ==
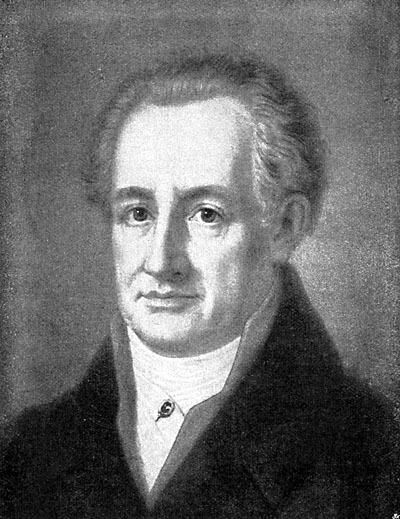
Goethe's approach to nature influences Waldorf schools' teaching of science.

Life sciences begin from age 6 or 7 with stories of "the living world." Observation and description of "the living world" begins at age 9 or 10. The curriculum includes lesson blocks on farming (age 9 or 10), animals (age 10 or 11), plants (age 11 or 12), as well as geology, human biology and astronomy (age 12 or 13).

At secondary school, Waldorf schools study the historical origins, cultural background, and philosophical roots and consequences of scientific discoveries. Educational scholar Bo Dahlin describes the Waldorf approach to science education as follows:

Teaching about any natural phenomenon [begins] with pure observations, for instance of an experiment such as the refraction of light in passing a prism, consciously holding back any theorizing about it. This is followed by as careful as possible reconstructing or recollecting the observed phenomena without them being physically present, followed by—on the following day—the conceptualization of that which was observed. Attentive dwelling on the observations of the senses enhances the potential of immediate experience to break through the armour of preformed conceptions or ready-made thoughts. The recollection of the observations made earlier stimulates penetration of what was experienced by active thinking.

— Dahlin, "On the Path Towards Thinking: Learning from Martin Heidegger and Rudolf Steiner"

The pedagogy is influenced by Goethe's phenomenological approach, whereby Nature is conceived as a meaningful whole from which human beings are not alienated. It emphasizes letting the "phenomena themselves speak", using both a genetic method that starts with personal knowledge, out of which conceptual understanding is developed and an exemplary method that focuses on in-depth investigation of key examples. Dahlin describes the process as "aesthetically rich knowledge formation" which "allows the children’s judgement to mature without 'jumping to conclusions'" and "teaches openmindedness, flexibility, truthfulness, and exactitude in dealing with phenomena of nature."

According to a 2009 European PISA study, Waldorf pupils' ability in science was "far above average" in the data set used. A 2007 German study found that an above-average number of Waldorf students become teachers, doctors, engineers, scholars of the humanities, and scientists. A 2003 evaluation by education scholars David Jelinek and Li-Ling Sun compared a group of American Waldorf school students to American public school students on three different test variables. Two tests measured verbal and non-verbal logical reasoning and the third was an international TIMMS test. The TIMMS test covered the scientific understanding of magnetism. The researchers found that Waldorf school students scored higher than both the public school students (and the national average) on the TIMMS test while scoring the same as the public school students on the logical reasoning tests. However, when the logical reasoning tests measured students' understanding of part-to-whole relations, the Waldorf students also outperformed the public school students. Although the study noted the Waldorf students' enthusiasm for science, the science curriculum itself was viewed as "somewhat old-fashioned and out of date, as well as including some doubtful scientific material." Educational researchers Phillip and Glenys Woods (2008), who also reviewed this study, criticize the conclusions about the science curriculum because it means the authors have posed an "unresolved conflict" whereby inaccurate science can lead to better science understanding.

A study conducted by California State University at Sacramento researchers outlined numerous theories and ideas prevalent throughout Waldorf curricula that were patently pseudoscientific and steeped in magical thinking. These included the idea that animals evolved from humans, that human spirits are physically incarnated into "soul qualities that manifested themselves into various animal forms", that the current geological formations on Earth have evolved through so-called "Lemurian" and "Atlantiean" epochs, and that the four kingdoms of nature are "mineral, plant, animal, and man". All of these are directly contradicted by mainstream scientific knowledge and have no basis in any form of conventional scientific study.

== History and geography ==
History begins with "mythical and archetypal narrative" (age 6–9 years). At age 10 history lessons begin to draw upon the local environment in connection with the local geography. Beginning at age 11, history is introduced as a formal subject. Throughout elementary school, history is primarily taught through biography, allowing for a human context for historical events.

== Foreign languages ==
Generally, two foreign languages are taught from age six on. Foreign language instruction in the first two years is purely oral; reading and writing of foreign languages are generally introduced toward the end of third grade. Language teaching in the first three years aims to give the children a sense of greater belonging and understanding of other cultures.

== Art, crafts, and handwork ==
In the elementary years, drawing is practised daily and painting weekly; in addition, children are taught modelling and sculpture with beeswax or clay. Also taught is an approach to drawing geometric and dynamic forms created by the early Waldorf pedagogue Hermann von Baravalle and known in the schools as "form drawing". Art instruction continues through the high school.

Handwork (including knitting, crochet, sewing and embroidery) is taught from age 6 on, with projects which may include cushions, socks, gloves and dolls. Woodworking normally begins during 5th or 6th grade. The secondary school crafts curriculum includes some combination of woodworking, basketry, weaving and book-binding.

== Music ==
In elementary school, children sing daily with their class teacher. Generally, bi-weekly general music lessons with a specialized music teacher begin in Grade 1 and continue through Grade 8. In High school, choir and various instrumental ensembles are continued, until the end of secondary school. Music is integrated into the teaching of academic subjects such as arithmetic, geography, history and science.

Recorders, usually pentatonic, is introduced in first grade, the familiar diatonic recorder in third or fourth grade, when the children also take up a string instrument: either violin, viola or cello. Waldorf pupils are generally required to take private music lessons when a class orchestra is formed, usually at age 9-10. By age 11-12, the children may switch to woodwind or brass instruments as part of the class orchestra or a separate band. Orchestral instruction continues through the end of a child's Waldorf experience, though in many schools it becomes elective at some point.

== Eurythmy ==
Eurythmy is a movement art, usually performed to poetry or music, created by Steiner and "meant to help children develop harmoniously with mind, body and soul". Eurythmy is a required subject in Waldorf schools in all years.

== Physical education ==
Physical Education, or Movement Education as it is called in many Waldorf schools around the world, begins in the early grades with rhythmical activities, then proceeds to various games, the circus arts, the Greek pentathlon, and on to more competitive athletics and team sports as the student moves towards high school. Bothmer Gymnastics was created by Fritz von Bothmer between 1922 and 1938 out of his work as the physical education teacher at the first Waldorf School established in Stuttgart, Germany. Bothmer Gymnastics™ offers a distinctive, planar approach to age-appropriate balance and coordination exercises.
