= Crowley House (Thousand Oaks, California) =

Historic house in California, US

Coordinates: 34°10′22″N 118°50′32″W

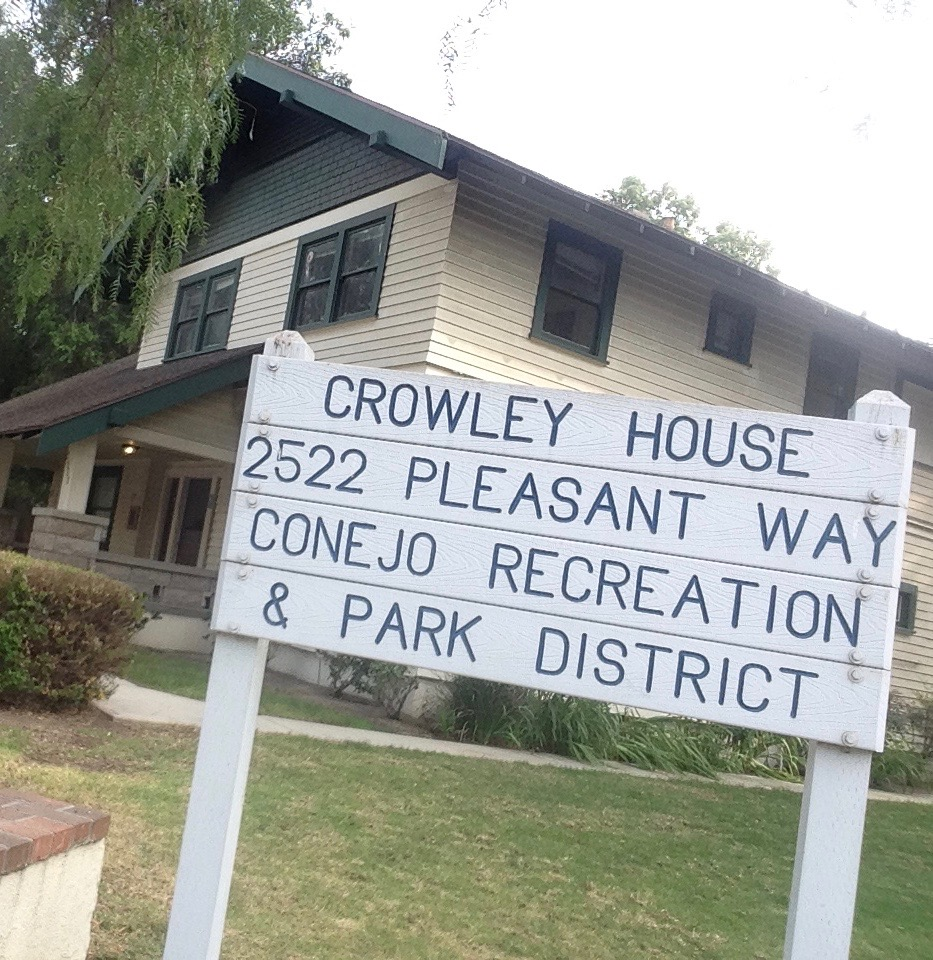
Front of the Crowley House

The Crowley House, also known as the Goebel House, is a historic home at 2522 Pleasant Way in Thousand Oaks, California. It is a Ventura County Historical Landmark No. 109, and a City of Thousand Oaks Historical Landmark No. 7.

== History ==
The five-bedroom Crowley House was built on the El Camino Real, on the site of the Newbury Ranch, in 1910 for newlyweds Frank and Mae Casey Crowley. In the 1920s, it was converted into a real estate office. It was nicknamed the "Mother of Thousand Oaks" in 1923 for its role in the development of Conejo Valley housing. The home was sold in 1925 to Dr. Eugene Parks, who lived there with his first wife, Jenny, until her death in 1932, and then with his second wife, Marie de Winstanley Parks, in 1934. Marie Parks began using the home as a showplace for her poetry, as she had been named poet laureate of the Conejo Valley for her song, “God of the Conejo,” and other music, dance, and theatrics took place at the home as hosted by the Parkses. The Parks couple sold the residence for use as a convalescent home, whose use was followed by a purchase by Louis and Kathleen Goebel, creators of Jungleland. Kathleen Goebel sold the house to the Conejo Recreation and Parks District in September 1986. It has since been used by the Recreation and Parks Department as a sports office and for school readiness and services for children 1-5 years, pre-natal classes, and early parenting groups.

== Gallery ==
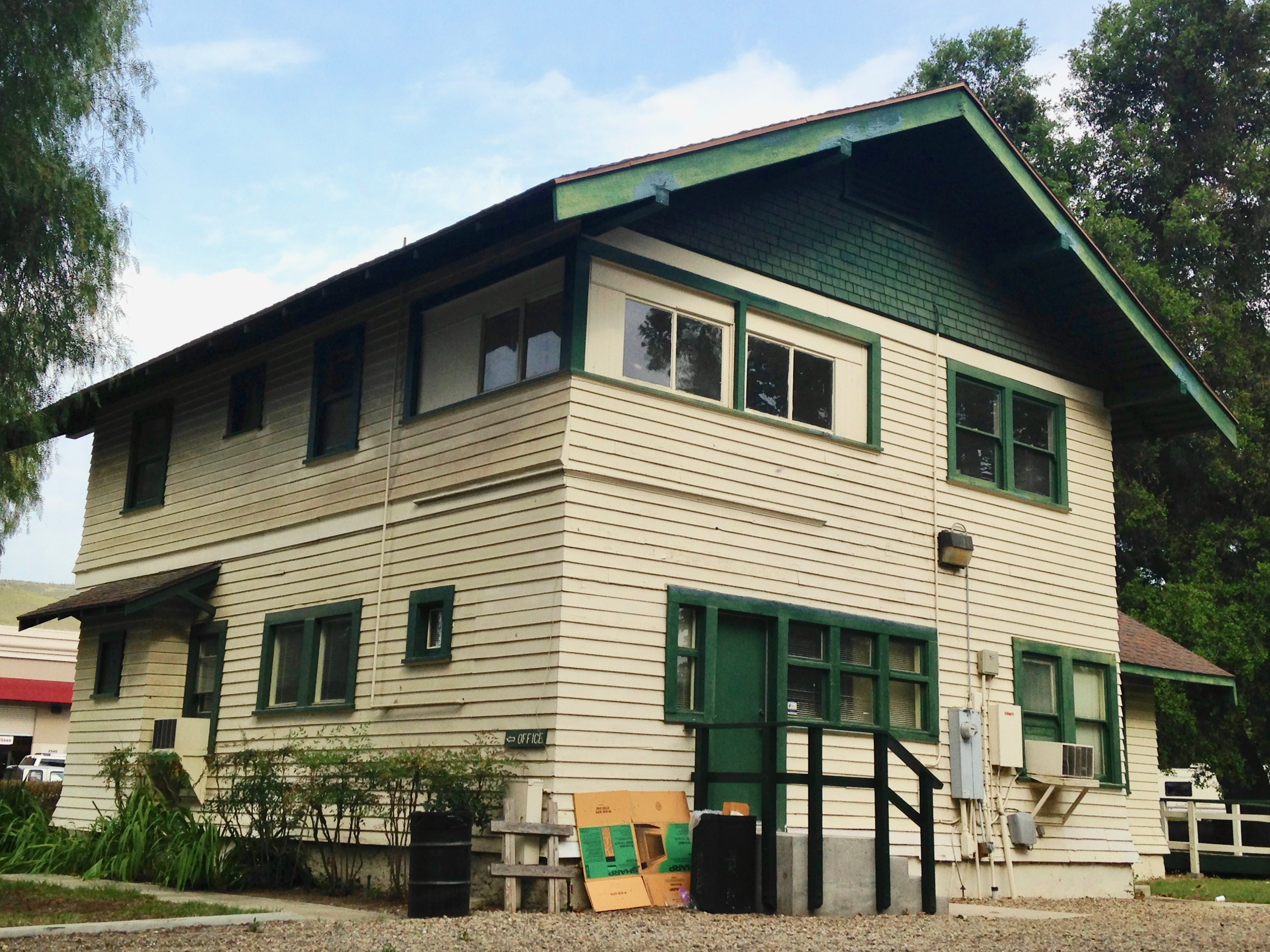
Back of the Crowley House

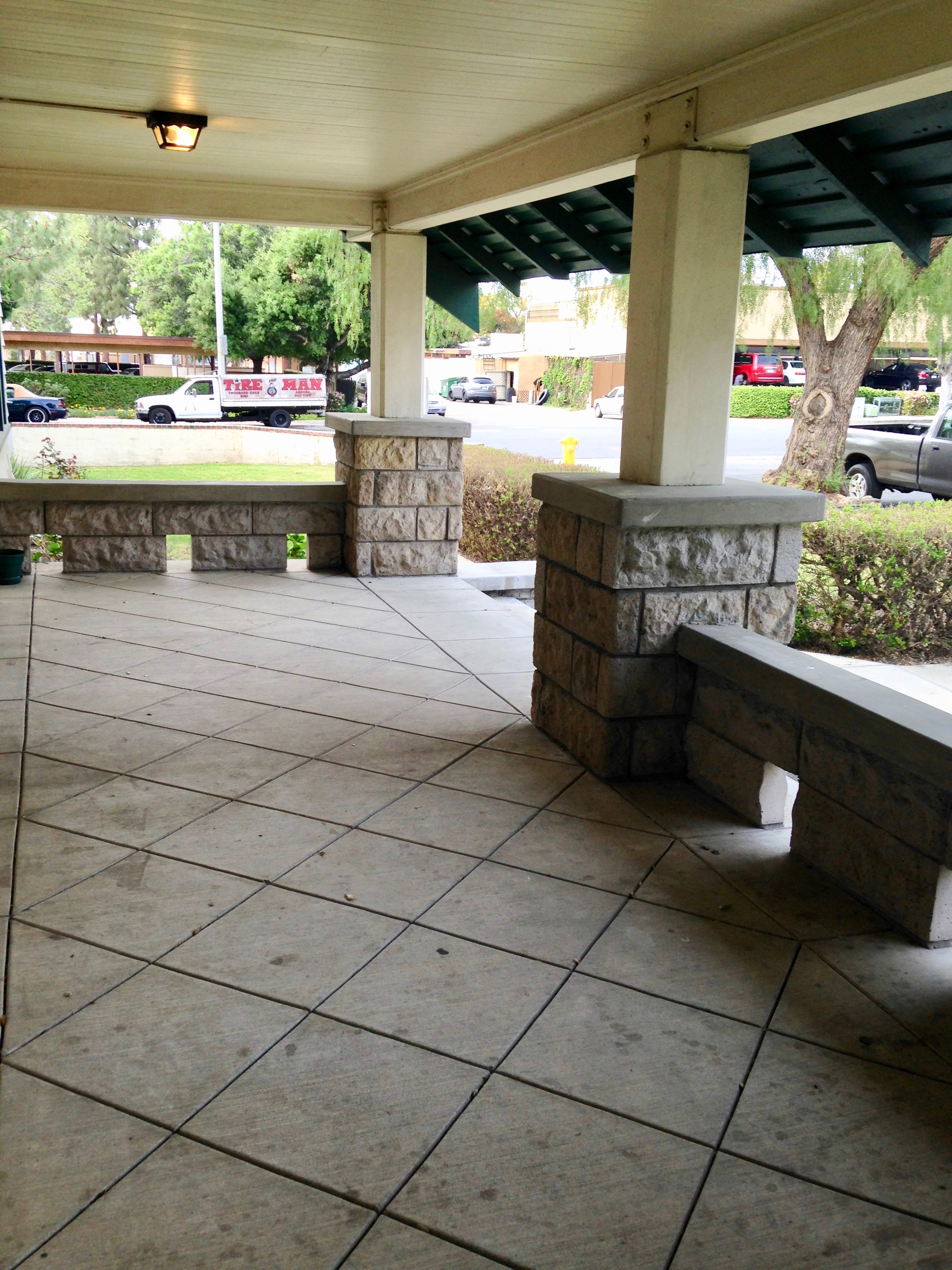
Crowley House porch

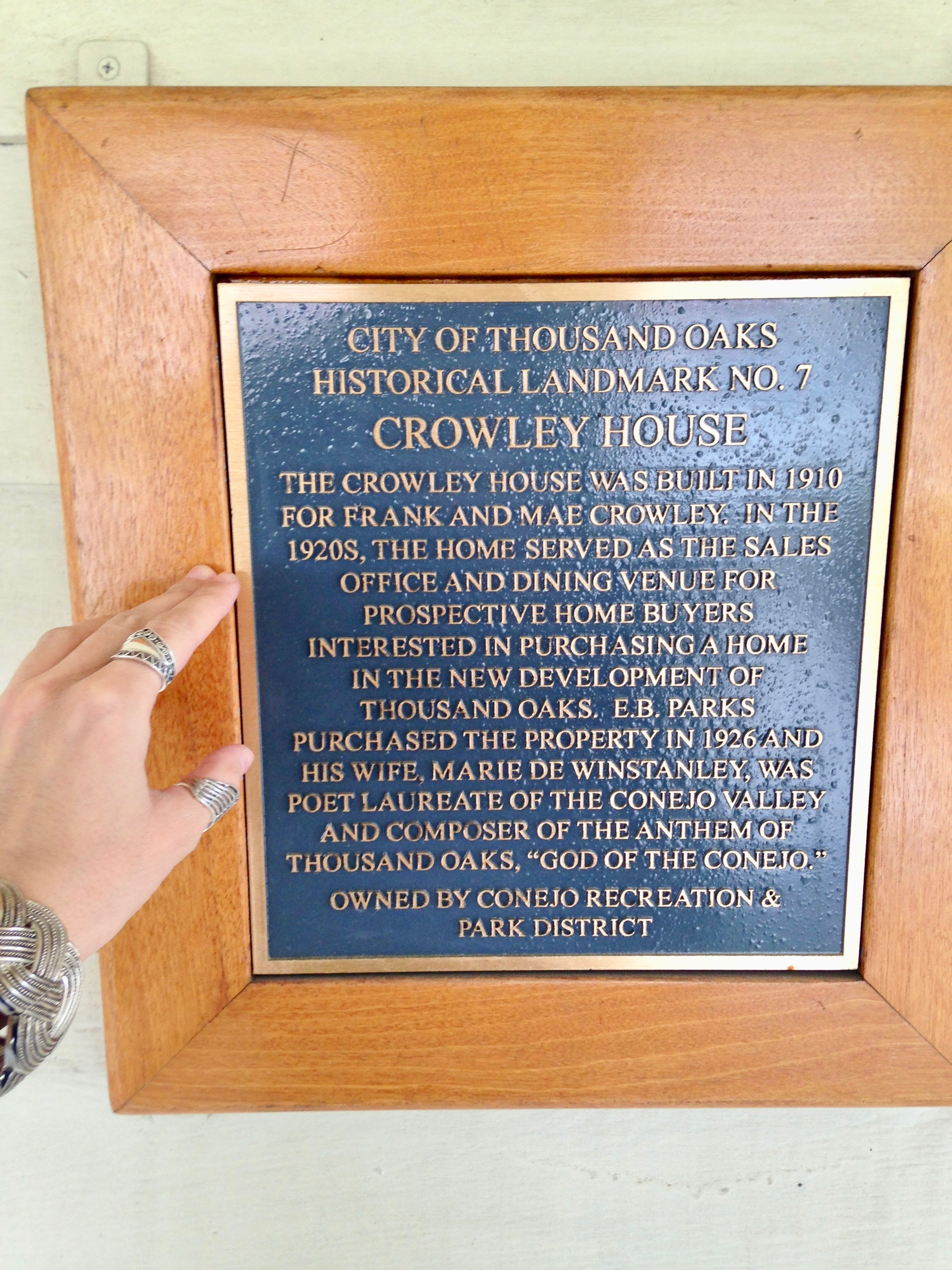
Historical landmark plaque

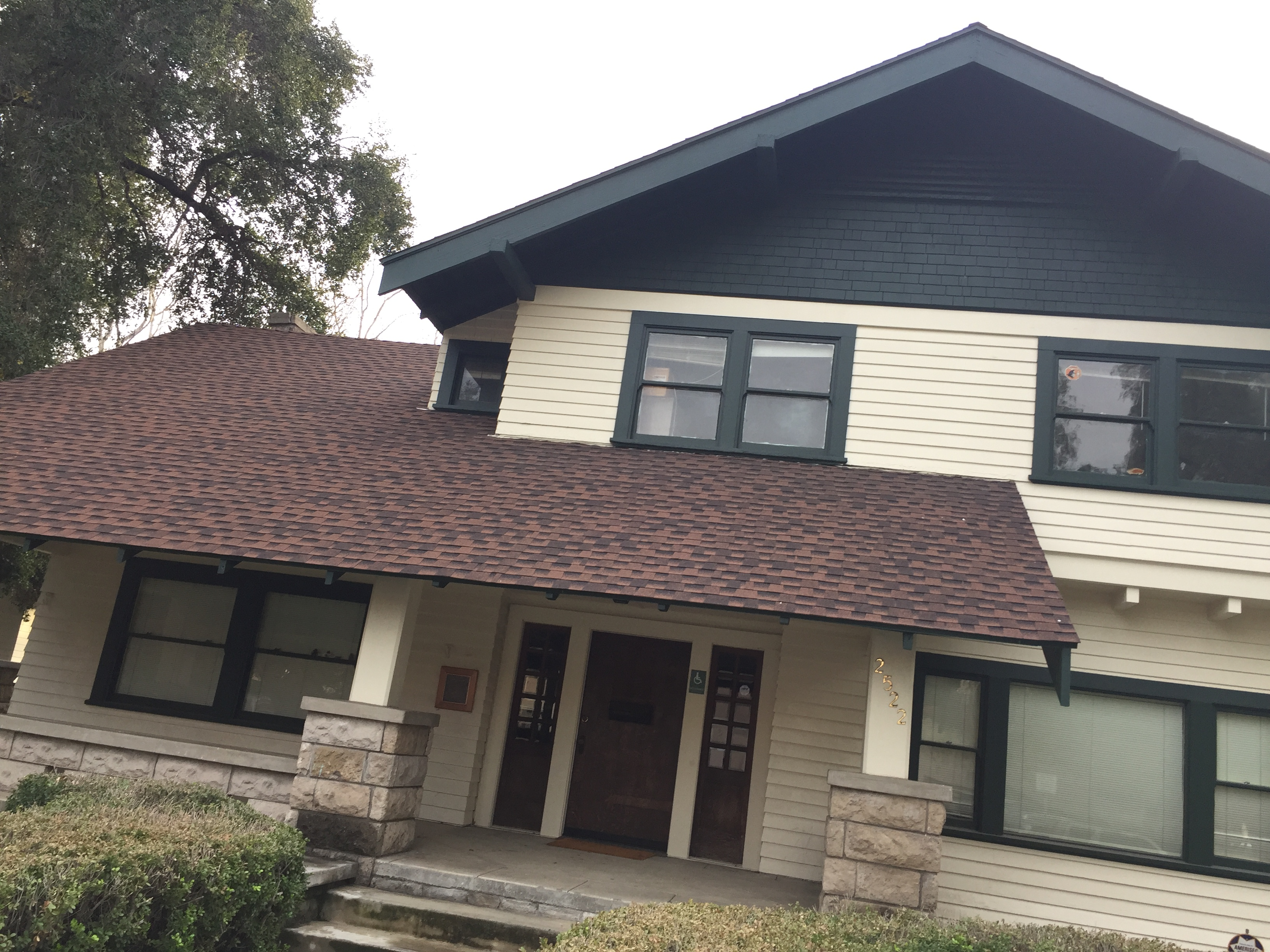
Front of the Crowley House
