= Main lesson =

Main lesson or main lesson block refers to a subject lesson or topic that is taught more intensely for a period of several (often three or four) weeks. The main lesson period is usually the first period of the day and typically lasts 100 to 120 minutes.

The topic of the main lesson is taught daily during that period but can connect different subjects if the topic allows for exploration from the perspectives of different subjects. The concept is primarily used in Waldorf pedagogy.

== See also ==
- Curriculum of the Waldorf schools
