= New York's 26th congressional district =

U.S. House district for New York

Coordinates: 42°57′43″N 78°50′28″W

- Interactive map of district boundaries since January 3, 2025
- Representative: Tim Kennedy; D–Buffalo
- Distribution: 95.52% urban; 4.48% rural
- Population (2025): 768,610
- Median household income: $68,490
- Ethnicity: 64.8% White; 17.7% Black; 7.1% Hispanic; 5.7% Asian; 3.8% Two or more races; 1.0% other
- Cook PVI: D+11

New York's 26th congressional district is a congressional district for the United States House of Representatives in Western New York. It includes parts of Erie and Niagara counties. The district includes the cities of Buffalo, Lackawanna, Niagara Falls, Tonawanda, and North Tonawanda. Its median income is the lowest of any congressional district in the state north of New York City, per a 2024 study.

Democrat Tim Kennedy was elected in a special election on April 30, 2024, to serve the remainder of Brian Higgins's term. Higgins had represented the district from 2013 to his resignation on February 2, 2024, to become president of Shea's Performing Arts Center.

== Recent election results from statewide races ==
Year	Office	Results
2008	President	Obama 63% - 36%
2012	President	Obama 64% - 36%
2016	President	Clinton 56% - 39%
2016	Senate	Schumer 74% - 24%
2018	Senate	Gillibrand 67% - 33%
2018	Governor	Cuomo 57% - 38%
2018	Attorney General	James 57% - 40%
2020	President	Biden 62% - 37%
2022	Senate	Schumer 61% - 38%
2022	Governor	Hochul 58% - 42%
2022	Attorney General	James 59% - 41%
2022	Comptroller	DiNapoli 62% - 38%
2024	President	Harris 59% - 40%
2024	Senate	Gillibrand 62% - 37%

== History ==
Historically, most of this district was located Upstate; however, over the years, until the 2002 redistricting, most of this area was in the 27th District. During the 1980s, this area was primarily in the 31st District. Two districts covered this area in the 1970s: the Erie County-based 38th, and the Monroe County-based 35th. The 26th District covered the area now in the 22nd District during the 1990s, and the area now in the 23rd District during the 1980s. In the 1970s, this district was centered in Orange and Rockland counties. During the 1960s, it covered areas in Westchester County, now in the 18th and 19th Districts.

== Counties, towns, and cities ==
For the 119th and successive Congresses (based on the districts drawn following the New York Court of Appeals' December 2023 decision in Hoffman v New York State Ind. Redistricting. Commn.), the district contains all or portions of the following counties, towns, and cities.

Erie County (8)

Amherst, Buffalo, Cheektowaga, Grand Island, Lackawanna, Tonawanda (city), Tonawanda (town), West Seneca

Niagara County (4)

Niagara, Niagara Falls, North Tonawanda, Wheatfield (part; also 23rd)

== Representatives ==
=== 1823–1833: two seats ===
From the creation of the district in 1823 to 1833, two seats were apportioned, elected at-large on a general ticket.

Years	Cong ress	Seat A			Seat B		
Years	Cong ress	Member	Party	Electoral history	Member	Party	Electoral history
March 4, 1823 – March 3, 1825	18th	Dudley Marvin (Canandaigua)	Democratic-Republican	Elected in 1822. Re-elected in 1824. Re-elected in 1826. Lost re-election.	Robert S. Rose (Geneva)	Democratic-Republican	Elected in 1822. Re-elected in 1824. [data missing]
March 4, 1825 – March 3, 1827	19th	Dudley Marvin (Canandaigua)	Anti-Jacksonian	Elected in 1822. Re-elected in 1824. Re-elected in 1826. Lost re-election.	Robert S. Rose (Geneva)	Anti-Jacksonian	Elected in 1822. Re-elected in 1824. [data missing]
March 4, 1827 – March 3, 1829	20th	Dudley Marvin (Canandaigua)	Anti-Jacksonian	Elected in 1822. Re-elected in 1824. Re-elected in 1826. Lost re-election.	John Maynard (Ovid Village)	Anti-Jacksonian	Elected in 1826
March 4, 1829 – March 3, 1831	21st	Jehiel H. Halsey (Lodi)	Jacksonian	Elected in 1828. [data missing]	Robert S. Rose (Geneva)	Anti-Masonic	Elected in 1828. [data missing]
March 4, 1831 – March 3, 1833	22nd	William Babcock (Penn Yan)	Anti-Masonic	Elected in 1830. [data missing]	John Dickson (West Bloomfield)	Anti-Masonic	Elected in 1830. Re-elected in the single-seat district.

=== 1833–present: one seat ===
Member	Party	Years	Cong ress	Electoral history	Counties in the district
John Dickson (West Bloomfield)	Anti-Masonic	March 4, 1833 – March 3, 1835	23rd	Re-elected in 1832. [data missing]	[data missing]
Francis Granger (Canandaigua)	Anti-Jacksonian	March 4, 1835 – March 3, 1837	24th	Elected in 1834. Lost re-election as a Whig.	[data missing]
Mark H. Sibley (Canandaigua)	Whig	March 4, 1837 – March 3, 1839	25th	Elected in 1836. [data missing]	[data missing]
Francis Granger (Canandaigua)	Whig	March 4, 1839 – March 5, 1841	26th 27th	Elected in 1838. Re-elected in 1840. Resigned to become U.S. Postmaster General.	[data missing]
Vacant		March 5, 1841 – May 21, 1841	27th		[data missing]
John Greig (Canandaigua)	Whig	May 21, 1841 – September 25, 1841	27th	Elected May 13, 1841, to finish Granger's term, and seated May 21, 1841. Resigned.	[data missing]
Vacant		September 25, 1841 – November 27, 1841	27th		[data missing]
Francis Granger (Canandaigua)	Whig	November 27, 1841 – March 3, 1843	27th	Elected November 1, 1841, to finish Greig's term, and seated November 27, 1841. Retired.	[data missing]
Amasa Dana (Ithaca)	Democratic	March 4, 1843 – March 3, 1845	28th	Elected in 1842. [data missing]	[data missing]
Samuel S. Ellsworth (Penn Yan)	Democratic	March 4, 1845 – March 3, 1847	29th	Elected in 1844. [data missing]	[data missing]
William T. Lawrence (Cayutaville)	Whig	March 4, 1847 – March 3, 1849	30th	Elected in 1846. [data missing]	[data missing]
William T. Jackson (Havana)	Whig	March 4, 1849 – March 3, 1851	31st	Elected in 1848. [data missing]	[data missing]
Henry S. Walbridge (Ithaca)	Whig	March 4, 1851 – March 3, 1853	32nd	Elected in 1850. Retired.	[data missing]
Andrew Oliver (Penn Yan)	Democratic	March 4, 1853 – March 3, 1857	33rd 34th	Elected in 1852. Re-elected in 1854. Lost re-election as a Know Nothing.	[data missing]
Emory B. Pottle (Naples)	Republican	March 4, 1857 – March 3, 1861	35th 36th	Elected in 1856. Re-elected in 1858. [data missing]	[data missing]
Jacob P. Chamberlain (Seneca Falls)	Republican	March 4, 1861 – March 3, 1863	37th	Elected in 1860. Retired.	[data missing]
Giles W. Hotchkiss (Binghamton)	Republican	March 4, 1863 – March 3, 1867	38th 39th	Elected in 1862. Re-elected in 1864. Lost renomination.	[data missing]
William S. Lincoln (Owego)	Republican	March 4, 1867 – March 3, 1869	40th	Elected in 1866. Retired.	[data missing]
Giles W. Hotchkiss (Binghamton)	Republican	March 4, 1869 – March 3, 1871	41st	Elected in 1868. Retired.	[data missing]
Milo Goodrich (Dryden)	Republican	March 4, 1871 – March 3, 1873	42nd	Elected in 1870. Lost re-election.	[data missing]
William H. Lamport (Canandaigua)	Republican	March 4, 1873 – March 3, 1875	43rd	Redistricted from the 25th district and re-elected in 1872. Retired.	[data missing]
Clinton D. MacDougall (Auburn)	Republican	March 4, 1875 – March 3, 1877	44th	Redistricted from the 25th district and re-elected in 1874. Lost renomination.	[data missing]
John H. Camp (Lyons)	Republican	March 4, 1877 – March 3, 1883	45th 46th 47th	Elected in 1876. Re-elected in 1878. Re-elected in 1880. Retired.	[data missing]
Sereno E. Payne (Auburn)	Republican	March 4, 1883 – March 3, 1885	48th	Elected in 1882. Redistricted to the 27th district.	[data missing]
Stephen C. Millard (Binghamton)	Republican	March 4, 1885 – March 3, 1887	49th	Redistricted from the 28th district and re-elected in 1884. Retired.	[data missing]
Milton De Lano (Canastota)	Republican	March 4, 1887 – March 3, 1891	50th 51st	Elected in 1886. Re-elected in 1888. Retired.	[data missing]
George W. Ray (Norwich)	Republican	March 4, 1891 – September 11, 1902	52nd 53rd 54th 55th 56th 57th	Elected in 1890. Re-elected in 1892. Re-elected in 1894. Re-elected in 1896. Re-elected in 1898. Re-elected in 1900. Resigned to become a U.S. District Judge.	[data missing]
Vacant		September 11, 1902 – November 4, 1902	57th		[data missing]
John Wilbur Dwight (Dryden)	Republican	November 4, 1902 – March 3, 1903	57th	Elected to finish Ray's term. Redistricted to the 30th district.	[data missing]
William H. Flack (Malone)	Republican	March 4, 1903 – February 2, 1907	58th 59th	Elected in 1902. Re-elected in 1904. Died.	[data missing]
Vacant		February 2, 1907 – March 3, 1907	59th		[data missing]
George R. Malby (Ogdensburg)	Republican	March 4, 1907 – July 5, 1912	60th 61st 62nd	Elected in 1906. Re-elected in 1908. Re-elected in 1910. Died.	[data missing]
Vacant		July 5, 1912 – November 5, 1912	62nd		[data missing]
Edwin A. Merritt (Potsdam)	Republican	November 5, 1912 – March 3, 1913	62nd	Elected to finish Malby's term. Redistricted to the 31st district.	[data missing]
Edmund Platt (Poughkeepsie)	Republican	March 4, 1913 – June 7, 1920	63rd 64th 65th 66th	Elected in 1912. Re-elected in 1914. Re-elected in 1916. Re-elected in 1918. Resigned when appointed to the Federal Reserve Board.	1913–1943; All of Dutchess, Orange, Putnam
Vacant		June 7, 1920 – November 2, 1920	66th		1913–1943; All of Dutchess, Orange, Putnam
Hamilton Fish III (Garrison)	Republican	November 2, 1920 – January 3, 1945	66th 67th 68th 69th 70th 71st 72nd 73rd 74th 75th 76th 77th 78th	Elected to finish Platt's term and elected in 1920 to the following term. Re-elected in 1922. Re-elected in 1924. Re-elected in 1926. Re-elected in 1928. Re-elected in 1930. Re-elected in 1932. Re-elected in 1934. Re-elected in 1936. Re-elected in 1938. Re-elected in 1940. Re-elected in 1942. Lost re-election.	1913–1943; All of Dutchess, Orange, Putnam
Peter A. Quinn (New York)	Democratic	January 3, 1945 – January 3, 1947	79th	Elected in 1944. Lost re-election.	1943–1953; Parts of Bronx
David M. Potts (New York)	Republican	January 3, 1947 – January 3, 1949	80th	Elected in 1946. Lost re-election.	1943–1953; Parts of Bronx
Christopher C. McGrath (New York)	Democratic	January 3, 1949 – January 3, 1953	81st 82nd	Elected in 1948. Re-elected in 1950. Elected Bronx County Surrogate Court Judge.	1943–1953; Parts of Bronx
Ralph A. Gamble (Larchmont)	Republican	January 3, 1953 – January 3, 1957	83rd 84th	Redistricted from the 28th district and re-elected in 1952. Re-elected in 1954. Retired.	| 1953–1973; Parts of Westchester
Edwin B. Dooley (Mamaroneck)	Republican	January 3, 1957 – January 3, 1963	85th 86th 87th	Elected in 1956. Re-elected in 1958. Re-elected in 1960. Lost renomination.	| 1953–1973; Parts of Westchester
Ogden Reid (Purchase)	Republican	January 3, 1963 – March 22, 1972	88th 89th 90th 91st 92nd	Elected in 1962. Re-elected in 1964. Re-elected in 1966. Re-elected in 1968. Re-elected in 1970. Redistricted to the 24th district.	| 1953–1973; Parts of Westchester
Ogden Reid (Purchase)	Democratic	March 22, 1972 – January 3, 1973	88th 89th 90th 91st 92nd	Elected in 1962. Re-elected in 1964. Re-elected in 1966. Re-elected in 1968. Re-elected in 1970. Redistricted to the 24th district.	| 1953–1973; Parts of Westchester
Benjamin Gilman (Middletown)	Republican	January 3, 1973 – January 3, 1983	93rd 94th 95th 96th 97th	Elected in 1972. Re-elected in 1974. Re-elected in 1976. Re-elected in 1978. Re-elected in 1980. Redistricted to the 22nd district.	1973–1983; All of Orange, Rockland, parts of Ulster
David O'Brien Martin (Canton)	Republican	January 3, 1983 – January 3, 1993	98th 99th 100th 101st 102nd	Redistricted from the 30th district and re-elected in 1982. Re-elected in 1984. Re-elected in 1986. Re-elected in 1988. Re-elected in 1990. Redistricted to the 24th district and retired.	1983–1993; All of Clinton, Essex, Franklin, Fulton, Hamilton, Herkimer, Jefferson, Lewis, St. Lawrence
Maurice Hinchey (Saugerties)	Democratic	January 3, 1993 – January 3, 2003	103rd 104th 105th 106th 107th	Elected in 1992. Re-elected in 1994. Re-elected in 1996. Re-elected in 1998. Re-elected in 2000. Redistricted to the 22nd district.	1993–2003; All of Ulster, parts of Broome, Delaware, Dutchess, Orange, Sullivan, Tioga, Tompkins
Thomas M. Reynolds (Clarence)	Republican	January 3, 2003 – January 3, 2009	108th 109th 110th	Redistricted from the 27th district and re-elected in 2002. Re-elected in 2004. Re-elected in 2006. Retired.	2003–2013 All of Genesee, Livingston, Wyoming, Parts of Erie, Monroe, Niagara, Orleans
Chris Lee (Clarence)	Republican	January 3, 2009 – February 9, 2011	111th 112th	Elected in 2008. Re-elected in 2010. Resigned.	2003–2013 All of Genesee, Livingston, Wyoming, Parts of Erie, Monroe, Niagara, Orleans
Vacant		February 9, 2011 – June 1, 2011	112th		2003–2013 All of Genesee, Livingston, Wyoming, Parts of Erie, Monroe, Niagara, Orleans
Kathy Hochul (Amherst)	Democratic	June 1, 2011 – January 3, 2013	112th	Elected to finish Lee's term. Redistricted to the 27th district.	2003–2013 All of Genesee, Livingston, Wyoming, Parts of Erie, Monroe, Niagara, Orleans
Brian Higgins (Buffalo)	Democratic	January 3, 2013 – February 2, 2024	113th 114th 115th 116th 117th 118th	Redistricted from the 27th district and re-elected in 2012. Re-elected in 2014. Re-elected in 2016. Re-elected in 2018. Re-elected in 2020. Re-elected in 2022. Resigned.	2013–2023 Parts of Erie, Niagara
Brian Higgins (Buffalo)	Democratic	January 3, 2013 – February 2, 2024	113th 114th 115th 116th 117th 118th	Redistricted from the 27th district and re-elected in 2012. Re-elected in 2014. Re-elected in 2016. Re-elected in 2018. Re-elected in 2020. Re-elected in 2022. Resigned.	2023–2025 Parts of Erie, Niagara
Vacant		February 2, 2024 – May 6, 2024	118th		2023–2025 Parts of Erie, Niagara
Tim Kennedy (Buffalo)	Democratic	May 6, 2024 – present	118th 119th	Elected to finish Higgins's term. Re-elected in 2024. Re-elected in 2026.	2023–2025 Parts of Erie, Niagara
Tim Kennedy (Buffalo)	Democratic	May 6, 2024 – present	118th 119th	Elected to finish Higgins's term. Re-elected in 2024. Re-elected in 2026.	2025–present Parts of Erie, Niagara

== Election results ==
In New York electoral politics, there are numerous minor parties at various points on the political spectrum. Certain parties will invariably endorse either the Republican or Democratic candidate for every office; hence, the state electoral results contain both the party votes, and the final candidate votes (Listed as "Recap").

1996 election
Party	Candidate	Votes	%	±%
Democratic	Maurice D. Hinchey (incumbent)	122,850	55.2	
Republican	Sue Wittig	94,125	42.3	
Independence	Douglas Walter Drazen	5,531	2.5	
Majority		28,725	12.9	
Total votes		222,506	100	

1998 election
Party	Candidate	Votes	%	±%
Democratic	Maurice D. Hinchey (incumbent)	108,204	61.8	+6.6
Republican	Bud Walker	54,776	31.3	−11.0
Right to Life	Randall Terry	12,160	6.9	+6.9
Majority		53,428	30.5	+17.6
Total votes		175,140	100	−21.3

2000 election
Party	Candidate	Votes	%	±%
Democratic	Maurice D. Hinchey (incumbent)	140,395	62.0	+0.2
Republican	Bob Moppert	83,856	37.0	+5.7
Right to Life	Paul J. Laux	2,328	1.0	−5.9
Majority		56,539	25.0	−5.5
Total votes		226,579	100	+29.4

2002 election
Party	Candidate	Votes	%	±%
Republican	Thomas M. Reynolds	135,089	73.6	+36.6
Democratic	Ayesha F. Nariman	41,140	22.4	−39.6
Right to Life	Shawn Harris	4,084	2.2	+1.2
Green	Paul E. Fallon	3,146	1.7	+1.7
Majority		93,949	51.2	+26.2
Total votes		183,459	100	−19.0

2004 election
Party	Candidate	Votes	%	±%
Republican	Thomas M. Reynolds (incumbent)	157,466	55.6	−18.0
Democratic	Jack Davis	125,613	44.4	+22.0
Majority		31,853	11.3	−39.9
Total votes		283,079	100	+54.3

2006 election
Party	Candidate	Votes	%	±%
Republican	Thomas M. Reynolds (incumbent)	109,257	52.0	−3.6
Democratic	Jack Davis	100,914	48.0	+3.6
Majority		8,343	4.0	−7.3
Total votes		210,171	100	−25.8

2008 election
Party	Candidate	Votes	%	±%
Republican	Chris J. Lee	148,607	55.0	+3.0
Democratic	Alice Kryzan	109,615	40.5	−7.5
Working Families	Jon Powers	12,104	4.5	+4.5
Majority		38,992	14.5	+10.5
Total votes		270,326	100	+28.6

2010 election
Party	Candidate	Votes	%	±%
Republican	Chris J. Lee (incumbent)	151,449	73.6	+18.6
Democratic	Philip A. Fedele	54,307	26.4	−14.1
Majority		97,142	47.2	+32.7
Total votes		205,756	100	−23.9

2011 Special Election
Party	Candidate	Votes	%
Democratic	Kathy Courtney Hochul	47,519	42.58
Working Families	Kathy Courtney Hochul	5,194	4.65
Total	Kathy Courtney Hochul	52,713	47.24
Republican	Jane L. Corwin	35,721	32.01
Conservative	Jane L. Corwin	9,090	8.15
Independence	Jane L. Corwin	2,376	2.13
Total	Jane L. Corwin	47,187	42.28
Tea Party	Jack Davis	10,029	8.99
Green	Ian L. Murphy	1,177	1.05
	Blank and void	259	0.23
	Scattering	232	0.21
Total votes		111,597	100.0
Turnout			
Democratic gain from Republican			

2012 election
Party	Candidate	Votes	%	±%
Democratic	Brian Higgins	212,588	74.8	+48.4
Republican	Michael Madigan	71,666	25.2	−48.4
Majority		140,922	49.6	+2.4
Total votes		284,254	100	+38.2

2014 election
Party	Candidate	Votes	%	±%
Democratic	Brian Higgins (incumbent)	113,210	68.1	−6.7
Republican	Kathy Weppner	52,909	31.9	+6.7
Majority		60,301	36.2	−13.4
Total votes		166,119	100	−41.6

2016 election
Party	Candidate	Votes	%	±%
Democratic	Brian Higgins (incumbent)	215,289	74.6	+6.5
Republican	Shelly Schratz	73,377	25.4	−6.5
Majority		141,912	50.2	+14.0
Total votes		288,666	100	+73.4

2018 election
Party	Candidate	Votes	%
Democratic	Brian Higgins	156,968	68.0
Working Families	Brian Higgins	8,929	3.9
Women's Equality	Brian Higgins	3,269	1.4
Total	Brian Higgins (incumbent)	169,166	73.3
Republican	Renee Zeno	61,488	26.7
Total votes		230,654	100.0
Democratic hold			

2020 election
Party	Candidate	Votes	%
Democratic	Brian Higgins	202,315	63.3
Working Families	Brian Higgins	20,304	6.4
SAM	Brian Higgins	657	0.2
Total	Brian Higgins (incumbent)	223,276	69.9
Republican	Ricky Donovan	91,687	28.7
Green	Michael Raleigh	4,628	1.4
Total votes		319,591	100.0
Democratic hold			

2022 election
Party	Candidate	Votes	%
Democratic	Brian Higgins	141,942	57.8
Working Families	Brian Higgins	14,941	6.0
Total	Brian Higgins (incumbent)	156,883	63.9
Republican	Steven Sams	70,547	28.7
Conservative	Steven Sams	17,792	7.2
Total	Steven Sams	88,339	36.0
Write-in		149	0.06
Total votes		245,371	100.0
Democratic hold			

2024 New York's 26th congressional district special election
Party	Candidate	Votes	%	±%
Democratic	Tim Kennedy	44,411	62.60%	+4.80
Working Families	Tim Kennedy	3,639	5.13%	−0.97
Total	Tim Kennedy	48,050	67.73%	+3.83
Republican	Gary Dickson	16,859	23.76%	−4.94
Conservative	Gary Dickson	5,123	7.22%	−0.08
Total	Gary Dickson	21,982	30.98%	−5.02
Write-in		159	0.22%	+0.12
Total votes		70,946	100.0%	
Democratic hold				

== See also ==
- List of United States congressional districts
- New York's congressional delegations
- New York's congressional districts
