= Jack Davis (industrialist) =

American industrialist (1933–2023)

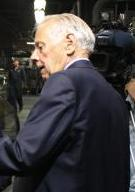
- Born: March 1, 1933; Pittsburgh, Pennsylvania, US
- Died: January 23, 2023 (aged 89); Buffalo, New York, US
- Education: University of Buffalo (BS)
- Occupations: Businessman; Politician
- Political party: Republican (before 2003, 2008–11); Democratic (2003–08)
- Other political affiliations: Save the Jobs (2004–05); Tea Party (2011)
- Spouse: Barbara
- Children: 6
- Website: Jack Davis for Congress

John R. Davis Jr. (March 1, 1933 – January 23, 2023) was an American industrialist, perennial candidate, and critic of free trade from Newstead, New York. Between 2004 and 2011, Davis ran four times for the U.S. House of Representatives in New York's 26th congressional district in Western New York. His campaigns were primarily motivated by his opposition to free trade policies, outsourcing, and the decline of manufacturing in the United States.

Davis was the owner of I Squared R, a silicon carbide heating elements manufacturer that he founded in 1964.

Although he was a lifelong Republican, he left the party in 2003 over disagreements on trade policy and ran for Congress as a self-funded candidate in the Democratic Party. He won the Democratic nomination in 2004 and 2006, when he came close to unseating Republican incumbent Tom Reynolds. In 2008, he lost the Democratic primary and supported Republican nominee and eventual representative-elect Chris Lee. After Lee's resignation in 2011, Davis ran in the special election to succeed him. After initially running as a Republican, he entered the general election as a candidate on the Tea Party ticket, playing the role of a spoiler candidate against Republican nominee Jane Corwin.

He was also known as the plaintiff in Davis v. FEC, a successful 2006 lawsuit against the Federal Election Commission, challenging the constitutionality of the so-called "millionaire's amendment" to the Bipartisan Campaign Reform Act of 2002. The Supreme Court of the United States, with Samuel Alito writing for the 5–4 majority, ruled in favor of Davis, striking down the amendment as a violation of the First Amendment to the United States Constitution for fundamentally restricting the rights of a candidate to self-finance their campaign.

== Early life and education ==
John R. Davis Jr. was born on March 1, 1933 in Pittsburgh, Pennsylvania to John R. and Norma Davis. His father had attended the University of Pittsburgh until the Great Depression and was an engineer for Westinghouse. His family moved to the Buffalo area after World War II, where he graduated from Amherst Central High School in 1951.

While still in high school, he joined the United States Marine Corps Reserve during the Korean War. Although his battalion was activated for service, he received a deferment to finish high school and another to complete his university degree. He continued officer training during summers at Quantico and Parris Island.

In 1955, Davis graduated from the University of Buffalo School of Engineering with a bachelor's degree in industrial engineering. He would later fund the construction of the university's Barbara and Jack Davis Hall. Following graduation, Davis was honorably discharged from the Marines and completed his military obligation in the United States Coast Guard from 1955 to 1958.

== Business career ==
In 1958, Davis began working at General Motors as a maintenance engineer at their Tonawanda foundry. He later worked at The Carborundum Company, a silicon carbide manufacturer, as a supervising sales engineer.

=== I Squared R ===
In 1964, Davis and fellow Carborundum engineer Stan Matys started their own silicon carbide heating element manufacturing business, I Squared R, out of Davis's garage. They soon secured their first client, Corning Glass, and became profitable within six months. They later relocated to Tonawanda before moving to larger facilities in Lancaster and later Akron. As of 2011, the company employed 75 people in its Akron facility and exported its products to most industrialized nations. During his political campaigns, Davis touted the claim that he had never outsourced any jobs. As of 2023, it was the only American manufacturer of its products and had acquired its primary competitors.

According to 2011 financial disclosure statements, his net worth was between $18.2 million and $83.4 million.

== Political campaigns ==
Beginning in the 1950s, Davis was a self-described "Goldwater Republican." In late 2003, he attended a Republican fundraiser in Buffalo featuring Vice President Dick Cheney. Davis attempted to discuss his opposition to U.S. free trade policies with Cheney, but Cheney's staff refused and ordered his ejection from the fundraiser, leading him to quit the Republican Party and join the Democratic Party. In 2004 and 2006, he ran as the Democratic nominee against Tom Reynolds, whom The New York Times as one of the most powerful Republicans in Congress. His 2006 campaign came within a few thousand votes of unseating Reynolds.

In 2008, Reynolds retired and Davis ran for the Democratic nomination for a third consecutive election. However, he finished third in the Democratic primary to Alice Kryzan. Following the primary, he supported Republican nominee and industrialist Chris Lee, returning to the Republican Party. When Lee resigned in 2011 amidst a sex scandal, Davis sought the Republican nomination to succeed him before running in the general election as a Tea Party candidate via petition signatures.

=== Political positions ===
According to The Washington Post in 2011, Davis' ideology was "too inconsistent to be readily categorized."

A major theme of Davis's four campaigns was his opposition to the outsourcing of United States manufacturing; Davis attributed the high rates of unemployment to the closure of 53,000 manufacturing plants from the 1980s to 2010s. He argued that free trade policies were the cause of job loss and, in his latter campaigns, the Great Recession, by preferencing multinational corporations and big-box stores, who had effectively purchased the White House and the Congress, over American manufacturers. Davis argued that, as a self-funded candidate, he was free of corporate influence and wanted to go to Washington to save American jobs, farms, and industry. Davis advocated for the repeal of free trade agreements, including the North American Free Trade Agreement (NAFTA) and the Central American Free Trade Agreement (CAFTA), which he argued allowed multinational corporations to undercut American-made manufactured goods and crops through global labor arbitrage by outsourcing production to nations with lower wages, such as China.

When asked about the issue of illegal immigration during an interview for the Republican endorsement in 2011, Davis reportedly shocked local Republicans by suggesting that illegal immigrants could be deported and that unemployed black youth could be bussed from the cities to harvest crops.

In 2011, Davis was described as favoring gun rights and said that his position on the Second Amendment was similar to that of other members of the Tea Party movement. He took inconsistent positions on abortion rights and opposed the Patient Protection and Affordable Care Act and the Emergency Economic Stabilization Act of 2008.

In 2016, Davis endorsed Donald Trump for president of the United States, citing their shared criticism of free trade deals and independence from Wall Street donors. University of Buffalo political science professor cited Davis's congressional campaigns as precedent for the region's support for both Trump and Bernie Sanders. In 2024, U.S. representative Nick Langworthy, who managed the 2006 campaign against him, cited Davis as "a pre-Trump canary in the coal mine for Western New York."

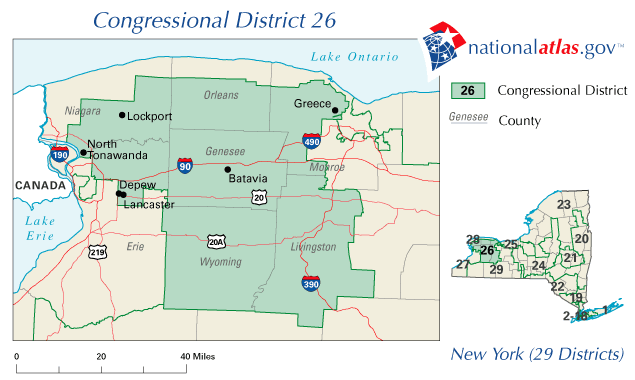
Davis ran four campaigns in New York's 26th congressional district between 2004 and 2011.

=== 2004 U.S. House campaign ===
In 2004, after his party switch, Davis entered electoral politics as a Democratic candidate for the United States House of Representatives from New York's 26th district against Republican incumbent Tom Reynolds, who was considered unbeatable. The district consisted of the areas between Buffalo and Rochester, a region with many struggling farms and factories, and Reynolds had won the 2002 election with 75 percent of the vote against 25 percent for his Democratic challenger. Davis spent a total of $1.2 million of personal money on his campaign, forcing Reynolds to run campaign ads for the first time since his first election in 1998.

On election day, Reynolds won with 56 percent of the vote against 44 percent for Davis, a major shift from 2002. Observers cited Davis's personal spending as the primary factor in his improvement over the 2002 margin, as well as an undercurrent of working-class resentment over the decline of the manufacturing sector. Others attributed the margin to the politics of the specific candidates; although he opposed free trade agreements, Davis generally advocated limited-government libertarian conservatism and criticized Reynolds' efforts to align himself with the Southern leadership of the Republican Party in Congress, including Tom DeLay.

==== Save Jobs ====
After the election, Davis was fined for violating campaign finance reporting laws by funneling money to his campaign through Save Jobs, a non-profit he had founded. The federal government and New York state both fined Davis for failing to comply with political disclosure requirements.

In March 2005, Davis officially registered Save Jobs as a political party to support his next campaign. Save Jobs advocated for However, the party soon ran into legal trouble. In one incident, an Erie County legislator sought an FBI investigation over last-minute automated phone calls made from Davis's campaign headquarters. In early 2006, Davis' state PAC was sued in a state court for improper filing of financial disclosures. Davis abandoned the fledgling party. Although Republicans accused him of using the party merely as a springboard for a 2006 rematch against Reynolds, Davis sponsored more than a dozen candidates for public office in races across Western New York.

=== 2006 U.S. House campaign ===
In 2006, Davis ran against Reynolds again as the candidate of the Democratic, Working Families and Independence parties under New York's electoral fusion rule. He was unopposed in the Democratic primary on September 12.

Amidst the Mark Foley scandal, it was widely reported that Reynolds, as a member of Republican congressional leadership, had knowledge of inappropriate e-mails between Foley and a male page, although he was unaware of more explicit instant messages reported by ABC News. In addition to the scandal, the Republican administration of George W. Bush was increasingly unpopular, leading to a Democratic wave in the 2006 elections. Davis led Reynolds in several polls taken during the month of October, but an early November poll showed him trailing 46 percent to 50 percent.

As in 2004, Reynolds won but by a much narrower margin. Davis lost by a "hair's breadth", according to The Washington Post.

==== Davis v. Federal Election Commission ====
Davis filed a successful lawsuit against the Federal Election Commission between his 2006 and 2008 runs for office, claiming that the so-called "millionaires amendment" to the Bipartisan Campaign Reform Act of 2002 was unconstitutional. The Supreme Court of the United States, with Samuel Alito writing for the 5–4 majority, struck down parts of the act for violating the First Amendment by fundamentally restricting the rights of a self-financing candidate to spend their own money in a preferred way.

=== 2008 U.S. House campaign ===
After Reynolds announced his retirement from Congress in 2008, Davis ran a third time for the seat. He began as the odds-on favorite to win the Democratic Party nomination for a third consecutive election, but he faced a challenge from Iraq War veteran and teacher Jon Powers. Davis ran aggressive attack ads against Powers, but ultimately finished third behind little-known environmental attorney Alice Kryzan and Powers. In the general election, Davis supported Republican nominee Chris Lee, a fellow industrialist. Lee defeated Kryzan with 55 percent of the vote against 40.5 percent. Powers, running on the Working Families Party line, received 4.5 percent.

=== 2011 U.S. House campaign ===
In 2010, Davis changed his political affiliation back to Republican, after developing a favorable working relationship with Chris Lee over the course of Lee's time in office.

Lee resigned from Congress in February 2011 amid a sex scandal, leading to a special election to fill the vacant seat which Davis contested. The election was expected to heavily favor the Republican Party, given their success in the 2010 elections and the Republican history of the district, and Davis initially sought to run as a Republican by meeting with local party chairs to seek their endorsement. However, Davis said the meeting "didn't go great." The Lockport Union-Sun & Journal reported that Republicans were averse to Davis because of his 2004 and 2006 campaigns against Tom Reynolds and his open willingness to seek the seat on a third-party line if he was not nominated. One county chair told The Buffalo News that Davis had disqualified himself by expressing views contrary to typical Republican positions. He reportedly shocked the chairs by suggesting that illegal immigrants could be deported and that unemployed black youth could be bussed from Buffalo and Rochester to harvest crops. Davis's spokesperson said the comments could be viewed as politically incorrect, but asked, "When you have African American people in Buffalo who do not have jobs and are out of work, why are you bringing people into this country illegally to take jobs?" The Republican Party instead endorsed Jane Corwin, an assemblywoman and wealthy businesswoman and heiress. The Conservative Party of New York, which had considered nominating Davis, also nominated Corwin.

Davis briefly but unsuccessfully sought the Democratic nomination, which went to Kathy Hochul, before deciding to run on a new independent Tea Party line. Davis hired paid campaign workers to collect over 12,000 signatures supporting his independent campaign, far more than the 3,500 required. He received the endorsement of the Tea Party Coalition of New York, a Libertarian Party-aligned group, but Corwin was endorsed by other Tea Party movement support groups, including the Tea Party Express, who criticized his use of the Tea Party name. Davis said that if elected, he would caucus with the Republican Party. As of May 13, Roll Call reported that Davis promised to spend as much as $3 million of his own funds and that Corwin had invested nearly $2.5 million of her own funds in the campaign. Roll Call also said that outside funds coming from both liberal and conservative groups had "turned the Buffalo and Rochester airwaves into a steady stream of campaign ads." Davis, in contrast to his opponents, received no assistance from outside funds.

Polling and reporting during the campaign showed Davis playing the role of spoiler candidate against Corwin. A late April poll by Siena had Corwin leading with 36 percent of the vote, followed by Hochul with 31 percent and Davis with 23 percent. An early May poll by the Public Policy Institute showed Hochul at 35 percent, Corwin at 31 percent and Davis at 24 percent, with an unusually high number of voters expressing a negative opinion of each candidate. The New York Times reported that Davis's candidacy, along with a reported Republican plan to privatize Medicare, had turned a "certain victory" for Republicans into a "fiercely competitive race."

During the campaign, a 15-second video clip circulated by local and national Republican organizations appeared to show Corwin's chief of staff, Michael Mallia, harassing Davis over skipping a debate, followed by Mallia yelping as Davis apparently shoved him or flapped at the camera. The video prompted bipartisan criticism of Davis and Mallia. In response to Davis' complaints that he had been harassed, Corwin said, "I've had cameras on me for two months now, and I've never hit anybody ... and I think that's the difference is how you handle a situation like that." The Corwin campaign denied requests for a longer, unedited version or a version made by second camera.

In the final result, Hochul won with 47 percent of the vote against 42 percent for Corwin. Davis finished third with 9 percent. TEA New York, a group which had endorsed Corwin, blamed Davis for Hochul's victory.

== Personal life and death ==
Davis died on January 23, 2023 following a long illness.

Davis married his third wife, Barbara, in 1993. He had six children, sons Jack, Bob, Al, and Ace and daughters Jill Josephs and Star Davis; 16 grandchildren and 22 great-grandchildren. In 2011, Davis claimed that "none of [his] grandchildren want[ed] to work at I Squared R."

== Electoral history ==
2004 general election
Party	Candidate	Votes	%
Republican	Thomas M. Reynolds	137,425	49
Conservative	Thomas M. Reynolds	10,672	4
Independence	Thomas M. Reynolds	9,369	3
Democratic	Jack Davis	116,484	41
Working Families	Jack Davis	9,129	3
Total votes		283,079	100

2006 general election
Party	Candidate	Votes	%
Republican	Thomas M. Reynolds	94,157	45
Conservative	Thomas M. Reynolds	15,100	7
Democratic	Jack Davis	85,145	41
Independence	Jack Davis	9,187	4
Working Families	Jack Davis	6,582	3
Total votes		210,171	100

2008 Democratic primary
Party	Candidate	Votes	%
Democratic	Alice Kryzan	9,792	41
Democratic	Jonathan P. Powers	8,500	36
Democratic	Jack Davis	5,602	23
Total votes		23,894	100

Special election May 24, 2011, U.S. House of Representatives, NY-26
Party	Candidate	Votes	%
Democratic	Kathy Hochul	47,519	42.58
Working Families	Kathy Hochul	5,194	4.65
Republican	Jane Corwin	35,721	32.01
Conservative	Jane Corwin	9,090	8.15
Independence	Jane Corwin	2,376	2.13
Tea Party	Jack Davis	10,029	8.99
Green	Ian Murphy	1,177	1.05
Total votes		111,597	100.0
Turnout			25

== See also ==
- List of political parties in New York
- Radical center
