= 2011 New York's 26th congressional district special election =

- May 24, 2011
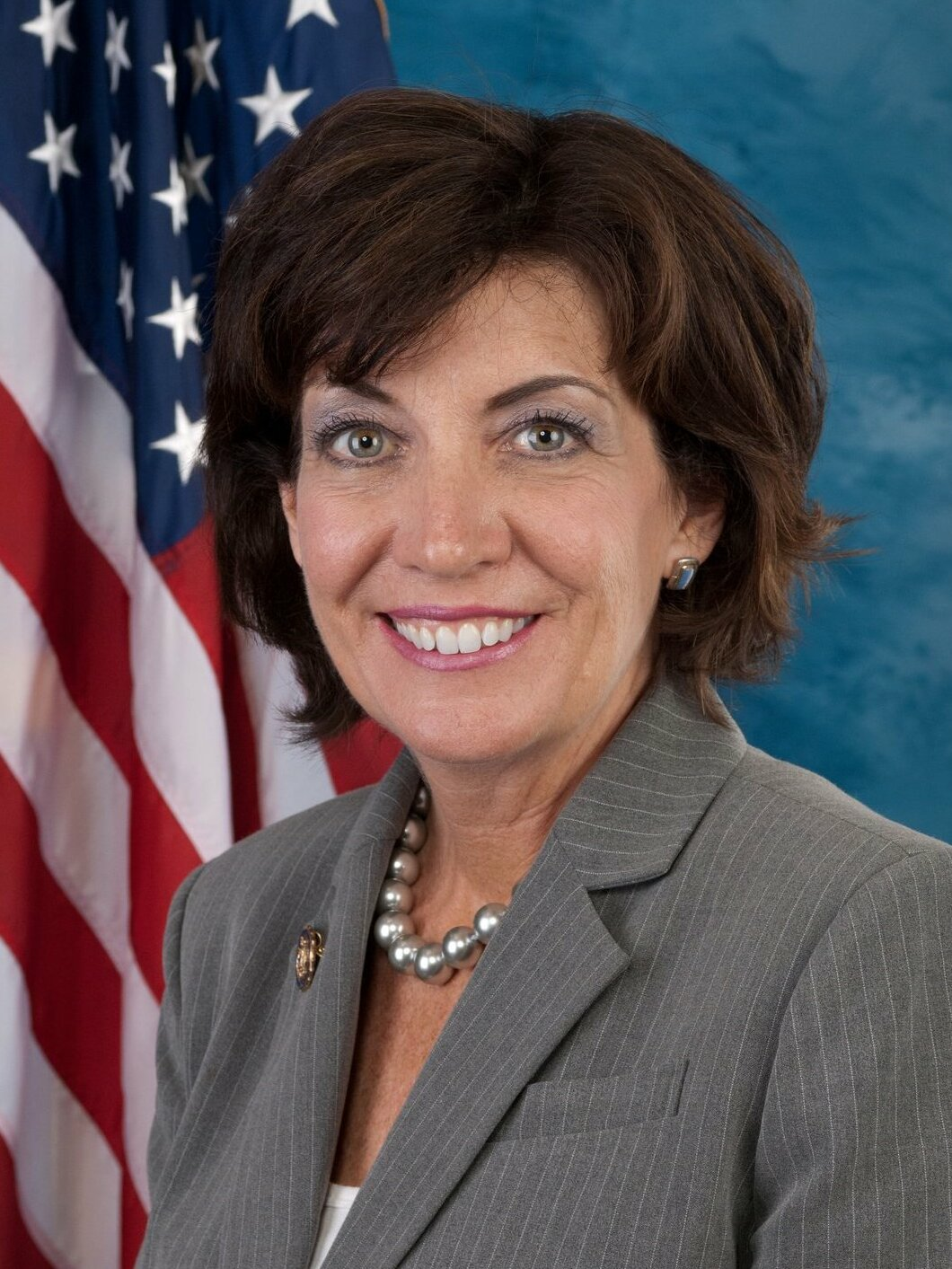

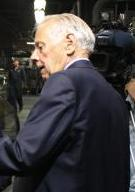
| Nominee | Kathy Hochul | Jane Corwin | Jack Davis |
| Party | Democratic | Republican | Tea Party |
| Alliance | Working Families | Conservative; Independence |
| Popular vote | 52,713 | 47,187 | 10,029 |
| Percentage | 47.2% | 42.3% | 8.99% |
- County results Hochul: 40–50% 50–60% Corwin: 40–50% 50–60%
Representative before election
Chris Lee
Republican
Elected Representative
Kathy Hochul
Democratic

A 2011 special election in New York's 26th congressional district was held on May 24, 2011 to fill a seat in the U.S. Congress for New York's 26th congressional district. The seat had been vacated due to the February 2011 resignation of married Rep. Chris Lee, who left office amid a scandal involving flirtatious emails and a shirtless picture he sent to a woman he met on Craigslist. Four candidates competed in the election: Republican Assemblymember Jane Corwin; Democrat Erie County Clerk Kathy Hochul; Green Party candidate Ian Murphy, editor of the Buffalo Beast; and independent candidate Jack Davis, a businessman running on the Tea Party line. On Election Day, Hochul won an upset victory, prevailing over Corwin by a margin of 47.24%-42.28%; Davis received 8.99% of the vote.

== Background ==
Under New York election law, special elections to fill vacant offices were held between 30 and 40 days of their announcement by the governor. In March 2011, at the initiative of Governor Cuomo and with the approval of the state legislature, the campaigning period was more than doubled, with the reason given that U.S. military serving overseas needed the extra time to receive and send back their ballots. The Capitol Confidential noted that the federal government had sued for the extension for the military and predicted that the change might also "shift... political tactics during the [special election] campaigns, which because of their short duration favor wealthy candidates and 'air wars'. Once the governor called the election, county chairpersons from each of the six qualified New York parties (Democratic, Republican, Conservative, Working Families, Independence, and Green) caucused to choose their candidates, with no primary election or petitions to circulate. Independent candidates also had the opportunity to petition onto the ballot.

=== Medicare ===
According to many observers, the campaign "turned into a referendum on the Republican plan to overhaul Medicare" because of Corwin's support for the Republican alternative budget proposed by Paul Ryan (R-Wis.), a proposal that would replace government-provided health care with partial subsidies for the cost of private medical insurance. Hochul criticized the Ryan plan and supports the Patient Protection and Affordable Care Act, which Corwin wants to repeal completely. Davis opposed both the Ryan plan and the Affordable Care Act.

=== Tea Party involvement ===
The local leaders of the Tea Party movement had divided their support between Republican nominee Jane Corwin, independent petitioner Jack Davis, and potential candidate David Bellavia. Jim Ostrowski, the leader of a libertarian-leaning tea party group (the Tea Party Coalition of WNY), endorsed Davis, criticizing Corwin for her lack of outreach to the Tea Party groups, and arranged to put the name "Tea" on Davis's ballot line. TEA New York, a more mainstream Republican-leaning tea party group, was divided between Bellavia and Corwin, with several of its members backing Bellavia's ultimately unsuccessful petition campaign and others (the best known being gubernatorial nominee Carl Paladino) backing Corwin from the beginning. After Bellavia failed to get onto the ballot, TEA New York endorsed Corwin. TEA New York refused to consider cross-endorsing Davis, mainly because of the use of the name "Tea Party" on Davis's ballot line (a tactic the Tea Party Coalition also used in the 2010 elections), to which he and numerous other Tea Party groups objected. TEA New York, the Tea Party Express and numerous other Tea Party groups campaigned on behalf of Corwin and attempted to portray Davis as a "fake Tea Party" candidate.

== Candidates ==
=== Democratic ===
Erie County Clerk Kathy Hochul was unanimously selected by local Democratic Chairs to be their special election candidate on March 19, 2011.

Other candidates interviewing for the party nomination included Jane Bauch, former Democratic Party Chair of the town of Murray; Mark Manna, Amherst town councilor; Martin Minemeier, a corrections officer from Henrietta; Satish Mohan, former Amherst town supervisor; Robert Stall, a geriatrician from Tonawanda; and Diana Voit, a resident of Erie County.

=== Republican ===
Assemblywoman Jane Corwin was selected as the party nominee the evening of February 21, 2011. Corwin had been considered the likely Republican candidate almost immediately following Lee's resignation.

Other candidates interviewing for the party nomination included David Bellavia, author and Iraq war soldier; Jack Davis, Amherst businessman and three-time Democratic candidate for the same seat; Brian Napoli, Ridgeway town supervisor; Peter O'Brien, U.S. Navy veteran; Barry Weinstein, Amherst town supervisor and former county legislator; Kathy Weppner, talk show host on WBEN; and Gary Wheat, former Avon council member.

=== Conservative ===
The Conservative Party of New York State endorsed Republican nominee Jane Corwin on March 14. Bellavia and Davis also sought the line.

=== Working Families ===
The Working Families Party endorsed Democratic nominee Kathy Hochul on March 20.

=== Independence ===
The Independence Party of New York endorsed Republican nominee Jane Corwin on March 14.

=== Green ===
The Green Party of New York, in the first election since 2002 in which the party has automatic ballot access, nominated Ian Murphy, editor of the Buffalo Beast, as its candidate on March 23, 2011.

=== Tea Party ===
On March 21, Jack Davis, who had also been rejected in his bid for the Republican, Conservative and Democratic endorsements, filed approximately 12,000 petition signatures, more than triple the necessary number, and was on the ballot on the Tea Party line. Davis spent $2.5 million of his own money on his campaign.

Jim Ostrowski, the unofficial proprietor of the "Tea Party" line, later stated after the election that he believed perennial candidate, and later New York State Assemblyman, David DiPietro was the best candidate for the seat, but did not believe DiPietro had the resources to run an effective campaign and had "almost given up" on running a serious candidacy until aligning himself with Davis.

=== Rejected petition ===
David Bellavia, who had tried but failed to receive party endorsement, attempted to launch an independent campaign. Bellavia submitted approximately 3,600 signatures under the "Federalist Party" line. His petitions were challenged by a local resident. In addition, Bellavia had failed to submit an affidavit formally accepting the nomination. Consequentially, Bellavia did not receive a ballot position, and the petition challenge was rendered moot. Bellavia eventually endorsed Davis for the seat.

== General election ==
=== Predictions ===
| Source | Ranking | As of |
|---|---|---|
| Sabato's Crystal Ball | Tossup | May 19, 2011 |

=== Polling ===
| Poll source | Date(s) administered | Sample size | Margin of error | Jane Corwin (R) | Jack Davis (T) | Kathy Hochul (D) | Ian Murphy (G) | Undecided / Other |
|---|---|---|---|---|---|---|---|---|
| Siena Poll | April 26–27, 2011 | 484 | ± 4.5% | 36% | 23% | 31% | 1% | 9% |
| Global Strategy Group • | May 2–4, 2011 | 400 | ± 4.9% | 31% | 26% | 30% | — | 13% |
| Public Policy Polling^{+} | May 5–8, 2011 | 1,048 | ± 3.0% | 31% | 24% | 35% | 2% | 8% |
| Siena Poll | May 18–20, 2011 | 639 | ± 3.9% | 38% | 12% | 42% | 1% | 7% |
| Public Policy Polling | May 21–22, 2011 | 1,106 | ± 2.9% | 36% | 13% | 42% | 3% | 5% |
| Results (for comparison) | [May 24, 2011] | 111,597 | ± 0.0% | [42.3%] | [9.0%] | [47.2%] | [1.1%] | [0.4%] |

- • Commissioned by the Hochul campaign
- ^{+} Commissioned by Daily Kos and the SEIU

=== Debate ===
| No. | Date | Host | Moderator | Link | Republican | Democratic | Tea Party |
| Key: P Participant A Absent N Not invited I Invited W Withdrawn | | | | | | | |
| Key: P Participant A Absent N Not invited I Invited W Withdrawn | | | | | Jane Corwin | Kathy Hochul | Jack Davis |
|---|---|---|---|---|---|---|---|
| 1 | May 18, 2011 | WXXI-FM | Julie Phillip | C-SPAN | P | P | A |

=== Results ===
The race was called for Hochul by multiple local and national news organizations, including the Associated Press, at about 10 p.m. EDT, an hour after polls closed and after a majority of votes had been counted. Corwin conceded the race that evening. Hochul prevailed over Corwin by a margin of 47% to 42%, with Tea Party candidate Jack Davis receiving 9% of the vote. Hochul's victory was viewed as an upset. While Republicans contended that Davis had taken votes away from Corwin and acted as a spoiler, DailyKos and Slate asserted that this contention was contradicted by polling data.

Special election May 24, 2011, U.S. House of Representatives, NY-26
| Party | Candidate | Votes | % |
|---|---|---|---|
| Democratic | Kathy Courtney Hochul | 47,519 | 42.58 |
| Working Families | Kathy Courtney Hochul | 5,194 | 4.65 |
| Total | Kathy Courtney Hochul | 52,713 | 47.24 |
| Republican | Jane L. Corwin | 35,721 | 32.01 |
| Conservative | Jane L. Corwin | 9,090 | 8.15 |
| Independence | Jane L. Corwin | 2,376 | 2.13 |
| Total | Jane L. Corwin | 47,187 | 42.28 |
| Tea Party | Jack Davis | 10,029 | 8.99 |
| Green | Ian L. Murphy | 1,177 | 1.05 |
| | Blank and void | 259 | 0.23 |
| | Scattering | 232 | 0.21 |
| Total votes | | 111,597 | 100.0 |
| Turnout | | | |
| Democratic gain from Republican | | | |

By county

| County | Kathy Hochul Democratic | | Jane Corwin Republican | | Jack Davis Tea Party | | All Others | | Margin | | Total votes |
| County | # | % | # | % | # | % | # | % | # | % | Total votes |
|---|---|---|---|---|---|---|---|---|---|---|---|
| Erie (part) | 23,961 | 53.8% | 17,454 | 39.2% | 2,936 | 6.6% | 189 | 0.4% | 6,507 | 14.6% | 44,540 |
| Genesee | 3,570 | 39.2% | 4,057 | 44.5% | 1,311 | 14.4% | 171 | 1.8% | -487 | -5.3% | 9,109 |
| Livingston | 3,567 | 41.7% | 4,054 | 47.4% | 692 | 8.1% | 239 | 2.8% | -487 | -5.7% | 8,552 |
| Monroe (part) | 9,129 | 44.2% | 9,313 | 45.1% | 1,736 | 8.4% | 458 | 2.2% | -184 | -0.9% | 20,636 |
| Niagara (part) | 8,820 | 47.0% | 7,472 | 39.8% | 2,275 | 12.1% | 189 | 1.0% | 1,348 | 7.2% | 18,756 |
| Orleans (part) | 1,451 | 40.3% | 1,684 | 46.8% | 402 | 11.2% | 64 | 1.8% | -233 | -6.5% | 3,601 |
| Wyoming | 2,215 | 36.1% | 3,153 | 51.3% | 677 | 11.0% | 99 | 1.6% | -938 | -15.2% | 6,144 |
| Totals | 52,713 | 47.2% | 47,187 | 42.3% | 10,029 | 9.0% | 1,668 | 1.5% | 5,526 | 4.9% | 111,597 |
