= List of political parties in New York =

This is a list of political parties in the state of New York.

== Statewide parties ==
Parties with automatic ballot access:

- Conservative Party
- Democratic Party
- Republican Party
- Working Families Party

Parties that formerly had automatic ballot access:

- Green Party (lost ballot access after 2020 election)
- Independence Party (lost ballot access after 2020 election)
- Liberal Party (lost ballot access after the 2002 election)
- Libertarian Party (achieved ballot access in 2018, lost ballot access after 2020 election)
- Reform Party of New York State (2015–present) (lost ballot access after 2018 election)
- Serve America Movement (achieved ballot access after 2018 election, lost ballot access after 2020 election)
- Women's Equality Party (lost ballot access after 2018 election)

Parties without automatic ballot access:

- Communist Party
- Constitution Party
- New York Federalist Party (2011)
- Federalist Party (1791–1824)
- Freedom Party (1994–1998)
- Freedom Party (2010–present)
- Marijuana Reform Party (1998–2002)
- Natural Law Party (1992–2004)
- New Party (1992–1998)
- New York Pirate Party
- Reform Party of New York State (2009–2014)
- New York State Right to Life Party
- Rent Is Too Damn High Party
- Save Jobs Party (2004–2006)
- Socialist Party
- Taxpayers/Federalist Party (2010–2011)
- Sapient
- Whig Party (1833-1854)

== Regional parties ==
- Black & Asian Democratic Caucus (Monroe County)
- Fix Our Roads Party (Suffolk County)
- Riverhead First Party (Riverhead Town)
- Rural Heritage Party (Sullivan County)
- Sustainable Southold Party (Southold Town)
- Tax Revolt Party (Nassau County)

== See also ==
- Political party strength in New York
- Politics of New York (state)
- Lists of political parties
