= Kathy Hochul =

Governor of New York since 2021

- Hochul in 2026

57th Governor of New York
- Incumbent
- Assumed office August 24, 2021
- Lieutenant: Andrea Stewart-Cousins (acting); Brian Benjamin; Andrea Stewart-Cousins (acting); Antonio Delgado; Adrienne Adams (elect)
- Preceded by: Andrew Cuomo

Lieutenant Governor of New York
- In office January 1, 2015 – August 23, 2021
- Governor: Andrew Cuomo
- Preceded by: Robert Duffy
- Succeeded by: Andrea Stewart-Cousins (acting)

Member of the U.S. House of Representatives from New York's 26th district
- In office June 1, 2011 – January 3, 2013
- Preceded by: Chris Lee
- Succeeded by: Chris Collins (redistricting)

8th Clerk of Erie County
- In office April 10, 2007 – June 1, 2011
- Preceded by: David Swarts
- Succeeded by: Chris Jacobs

Member of the Hamburg Town Board
- In office January 3, 1994 – April 10, 2007
- Preceded by: Patrick Hoak
- Succeeded by: Richard Smith

Personal details
- Born: Kathleen Mary Courtney; August 27, 1958 (age 68) Buffalo, New York, U.S.
- Party: Democratic
- Spouse: Bill Hochul (m. 1984)
- Children: 2
- Education: Syracuse University (BA); Catholic University of America (JD)
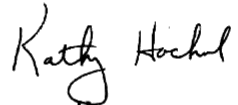
- Signature
- Website: Office website; Campaign website
- Hochul's voice Hochul supporting the American Jobs Act. Recorded October 24, 2011

Kathleen Mary Hochul (Note: /ˈhoʊkəl/ HOH-kəl) (Note: While several sources list her name as Kathleen Courtney Hochul, her legal name is Kathleen Mary Hochul. She uses Kathleen Courtney Hochul in professional contexts, but it is not her legal name.) (née Courtney; born August 27, 1958) is an American politician and lawyer who has served since 2021 as the 57th governor of New York. A member of the Democratic Party, she is New York's first female governor.

Born in Buffalo, New York, Hochul graduated from Syracuse University in 1980 and the Catholic University of America Columbus School of Law in 1984. After serving on the town board of Hamburg and as deputy Erie County clerk, Hochul was appointed Erie County clerk in 2007. She was elected to a full term as Erie County clerk in 2007 and reelected in 2010. In May 2011, Hochul won a four-candidate special election for New York's 26th congressional district and became the first Democrat to represent the district in 40 years. She served as a U.S. representative from 2011 to 2013 and was narrowly defeated for reelection in 2012 by Republican Chris Collins following redistricting.

In the 2014 New York gubernatorial election, incumbent Governor Andrew Cuomo selected Hochul as his running mate; after they won the election, Hochul was inaugurated as lieutenant governor. Cuomo and Hochul were reelected in 2018. Hochul took office as governor of New York on August 24, 2021, after Cuomo resigned amid allegations of sexual harassment. She won a full term in 2022 against Republican nominee and U.S. Representative Lee Zeldin in the narrowest New York gubernatorial election since 1994.

== Early life and education ==
Kathleen Mary Courtney was born in Buffalo, New York, the second of the six children of John Patrick "Jack" Courtney, a clerical worker, and Patricia Ann "Pat" Courtney (née Rochford), a homemaker. Her family is Irish Catholic. The family struggled financially during Hochul's early years and for a time lived in a trailer near a steel plant. By the time Hochul was in college, her father was working for the information technology company he later headed.

Hochul graduated from Hamburg High School in 1976. She was politically active during her college years at Syracuse University, becoming a student government vice president. She led a boycott of the student bookstore over high prices and an unsuccessful effort to name the university stadium after alumnus Ernie Davis, a star running back who died of cancer before he could join the National Football League. Hochul also lobbied the university to divest from apartheid South Africa. The university divested in November 1985, more than five years after she graduated. In the spring of 1979, the student newspaper The Daily Orange awarded her an "A", citing the campus changes as evidence for the grade.

Hochul received a Bachelor of Arts with a major in political science from the Maxwell School of Citizenship and Public Affairs at Syracuse University in 1980. She enrolled at the Columbus School of Law of the Catholic University of America in Washington, D.C., and received a Juris Doctor in 1984.

== Early career ==
After graduation from law school, Hochul began working for a Washington, D.C., law firm, but she found the work unsatisfying. She then worked as legal counsel and legislative assistant to U.S. Representative John LaFalce and U.S. Senator Daniel Moynihan, and also for the New York State Assembly, before seeking elected office.

Hochul became involved in local issues as a supporter of small businesses facing competition from Walmart stores and, in the process, caught the attention of local Democratic leaders. On January 3, 1994, the Hamburg Town Board voted to appoint her to the vacant seat on the board caused by Patrick H. Hoak's resignation to become town supervisor. She was elected to a full term in November 1994, on the Democratic and Conservative lines, and was reelected in 1998, 2002, and 2006. She resigned on April 10, 2007, and was succeeded by former state assemblymember Richard A. Smith. While on the board, she led efforts to remove toll booths from parts of the New York State Thruway system.

In May 2003, Erie County Clerk David Swarts appointed Hochul as his deputy. Governor Eliot Spitzer named Swarts to his administration in January 2007 and appointed Hochul to succeed Swarts as county clerk in April 2007. In an intervention that raised her statewide profile, Hochul opposed Spitzer's proposal to allow undocumented immigrants to obtain driver's licenses without producing Social Security cards. She said that if the proposal went into effect, she would seek to have any such applicants arrested. On November 6, 2007, Hochul was elected to fill the remainder of Swarts's term. On November 14, 2007, Spitzer abandoned his effort to allow undocumented immigrants to obtain driver's licenses.

In 2010, New York Democrats proposed mandating that all New York drivers obtain new license plates. The proposal was expected to bring the state government $129 million in revenue. Hochul opposed the proposal, and it was withdrawn.

In November 2010, Hochul ran for reelection on four ballot lines (Democratic, Conservative, Independence, and Working Families), defeating Republican Clifton Bergfeld with 80% of the vote.

After Hochul's departure as county clerk, newly elected County Clerk Chris Jacobs discovered a backlog of mail and later said that $792,571 in checks were found in it.

== U.S. House of Representatives (2011–2013) ==
=== Elections ===
==== 2011 special ====
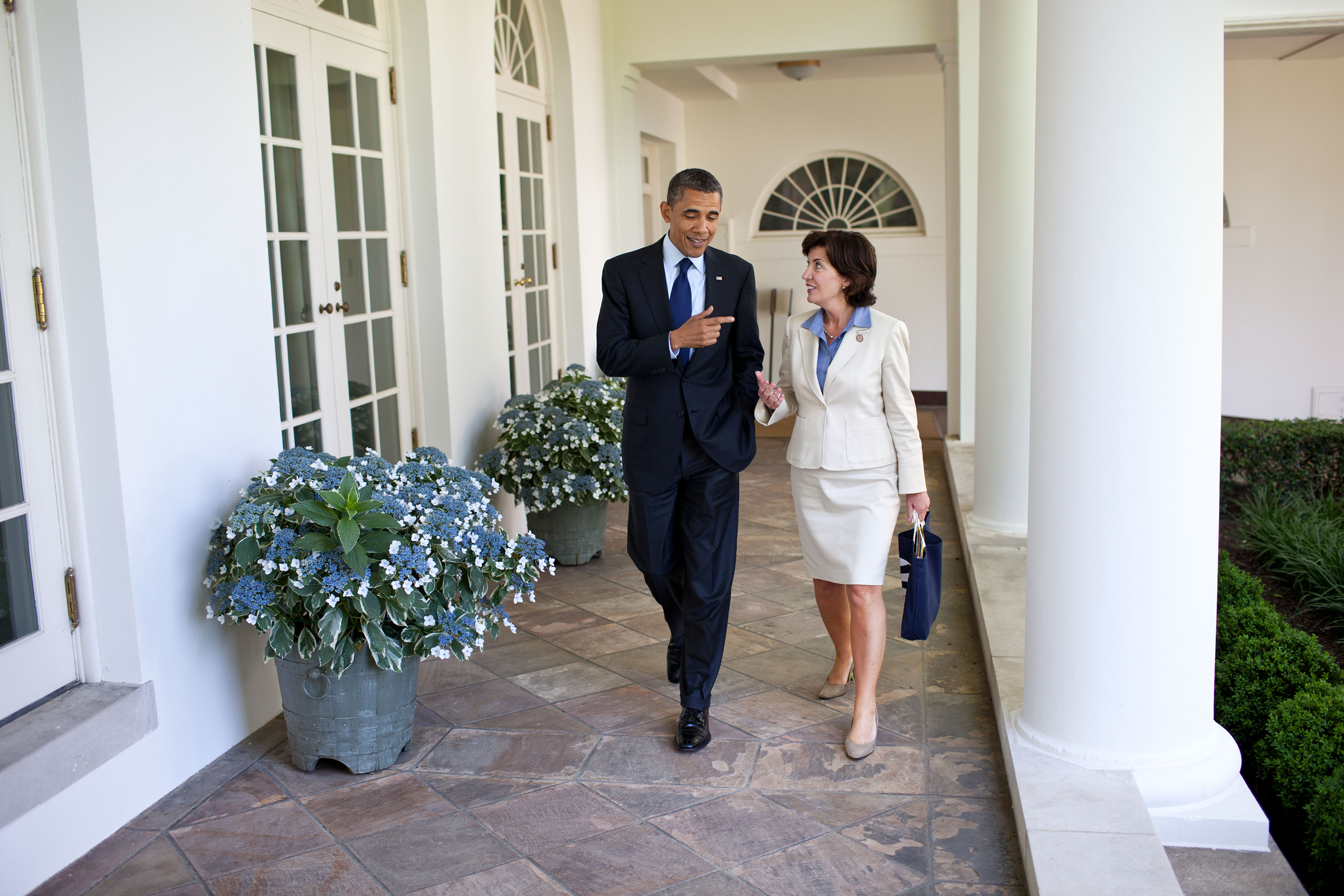
Hochul with President Barack Obama, following her 2011 election to represent New York's 26th district

Hochul ran in the May 24, 2011, special election to fill the seat in New York's 26th congressional district left vacant by the resignation of Chris Lee. She was the Democratic Party and Working Families Party nominee. Hochul's residence in Hamburg, just outside the 26th district, became an issue during her campaign, though it did not disqualify her from seeking the seat. One month after her victory, she moved into the district.

The Republican and Conservative Party nominee, State Assemblymember Jane Corwin, was at first strongly favored to win in the Republican-leaning district, which had sent a Republican to Congress for the previous four decades. A late April poll showed Corwin leading Hochul by 36% to 31%; Tea Party candidate Jack Davis trailed at 23%. An early May poll gave Hochul a lead of 35% to 31%, and shortly thereafter the nonpartisan Rothenberg Political Report called the race a toss-up. Additional polling in the days immediately before the election had Hochul leading by four- and six-point margins.

A Washington Post article noted that in the face of a possible Hochul victory, there was already a "full blown spin war" about the meaning of the result. The article said that Democrats viewed the close race as a result of Republicans' budget proposal "The Path to Prosperity", and, in particular, their proposal for Medicare reform. Republicans viewed it as the result of Davis's third-party candidacy.

The campaign featured a number of negative television ads. FactCheck accused both sides of "taking liberties with the facts". In particular, FactCheck criticized the Democrats' ads for claiming that Corwin would "essentially end Medicare", even though the plan left Medicare intact for current beneficiaries. The organization also faulted the Republicans for ads portraying Hochul as a puppet of former Speaker Nancy Pelosi, and for claiming that Hochul planned to cut Social Security and Medicare benefits.

Hochul was endorsed by EMILY's List, a political action committee that supports Democratic women candidates who support abortion rights. She was the fifth largest recipient of EMILY's List funds in 2011, receiving more than $27,000 in bundled donations. The Democrat and Chronicle endorsed Hochul "for her tenacity and independence", while The Buffalo News endorsed her for her positions on preserving Medicare and her record of streamlining government.

Hochul defeated Corwin 47% to 42%, with Davis receiving 9% and Green Party candidate Ian Murphy 1%.

==== 2012 ====
Before the 2012 election, Hochul's district was renumbered the 27th during the redistricting process. The district was redrawn in a manner that caused it to be more heavily Republican. Hochul was endorsed by the NRA Political Victory Fund. She lost to Republican Chris Collins, 51% to 49%.

=== Tenure ===
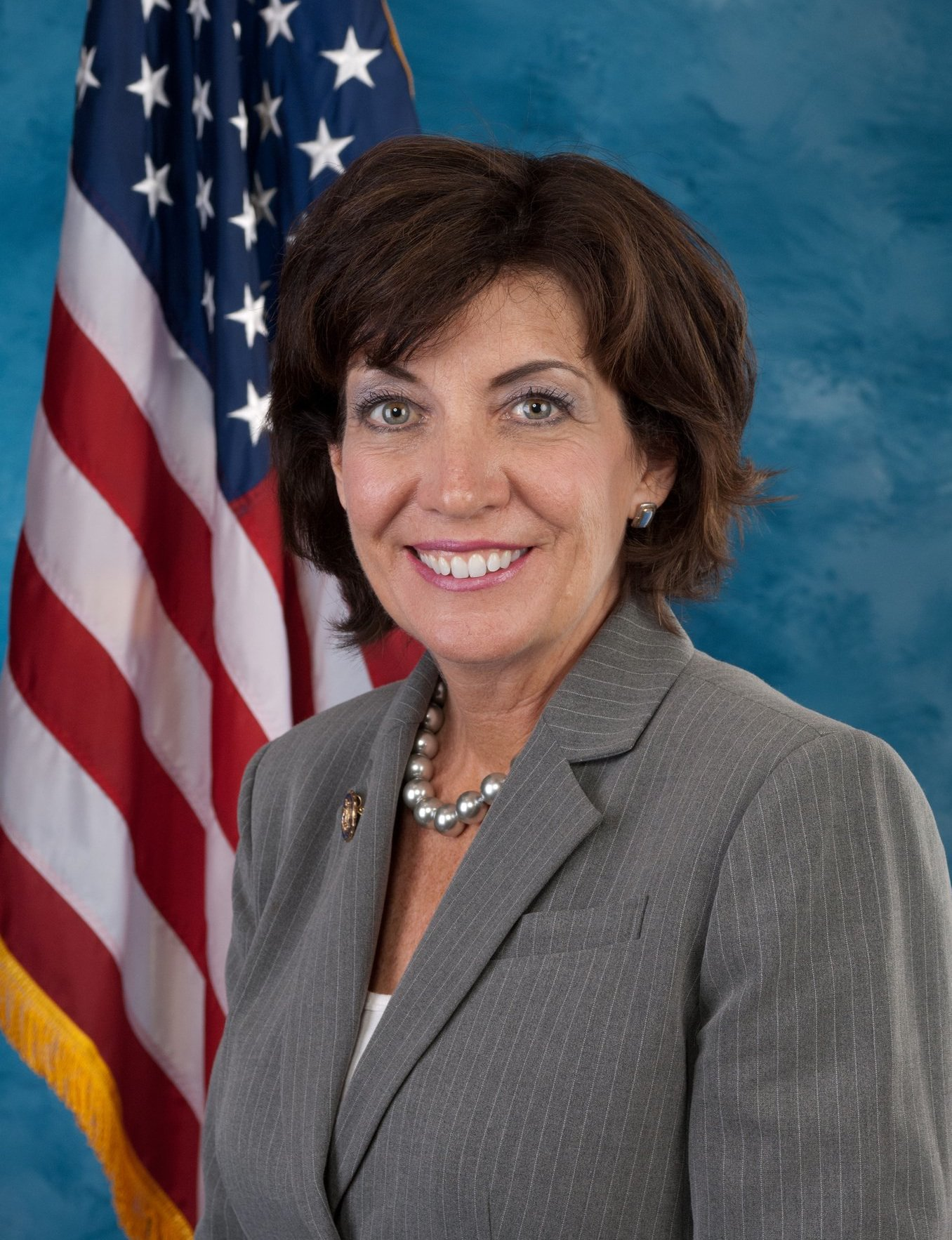
Hochul during the 112th Congress, 2011

In Hochul's first few weeks in office, she co-sponsored bills with Brian Higgins to streamline the passport acquisition process. She also met with then-President Barack Obama about the economy and job creation and introduced a motion to restore the Republican cuts to the Commodity Futures Trading Commission. She looked for ways to reduce the federal budget deficit and expressed support for reducing Medicaid spending as long as the reductions would not be achieved in the form of block grants offered to states, as proposed in the Republican budget blueprint. She also spoke with Obama about ending tax breaks for oil companies and protecting small businesses.

While campaigning for Congress, Hochul called herself an "independent Democrat". In an interview with the Lockport Union-Sun & Journal, she cited as examples of her independence her opposition to then-Governor Eliot Spitzer's driver's license program for undocumented immigrants and her opposition to then-Governor David Paterson's 2010 proposal to raise revenue by requiring all vehicle owners to buy new license plates.

Hochul was one of 17 Democrats to join Republicans in supporting a resolution finding United States Attorney General Eric Holder in contempt of Congress relating to the ATF gunwalking scandal, a vote on which the NRA, which supported the resolution, announced it would be scoring lawmakers. Later in 2012, Hochul "trumpeted" her endorsement by the NRA and noted that she was just one of two New York Democrats to receive its support.

=== Committee assignments ===
- Committee on Armed Services
- Committee on Homeland Security
  - Subcommittee on Counterterrorism and Intelligence
  - Subcommittee on Emergency Preparedness, Response, and Communications

== Lieutenant governor of New York (2015–2021) ==
=== Elections ===
==== 2014 ====
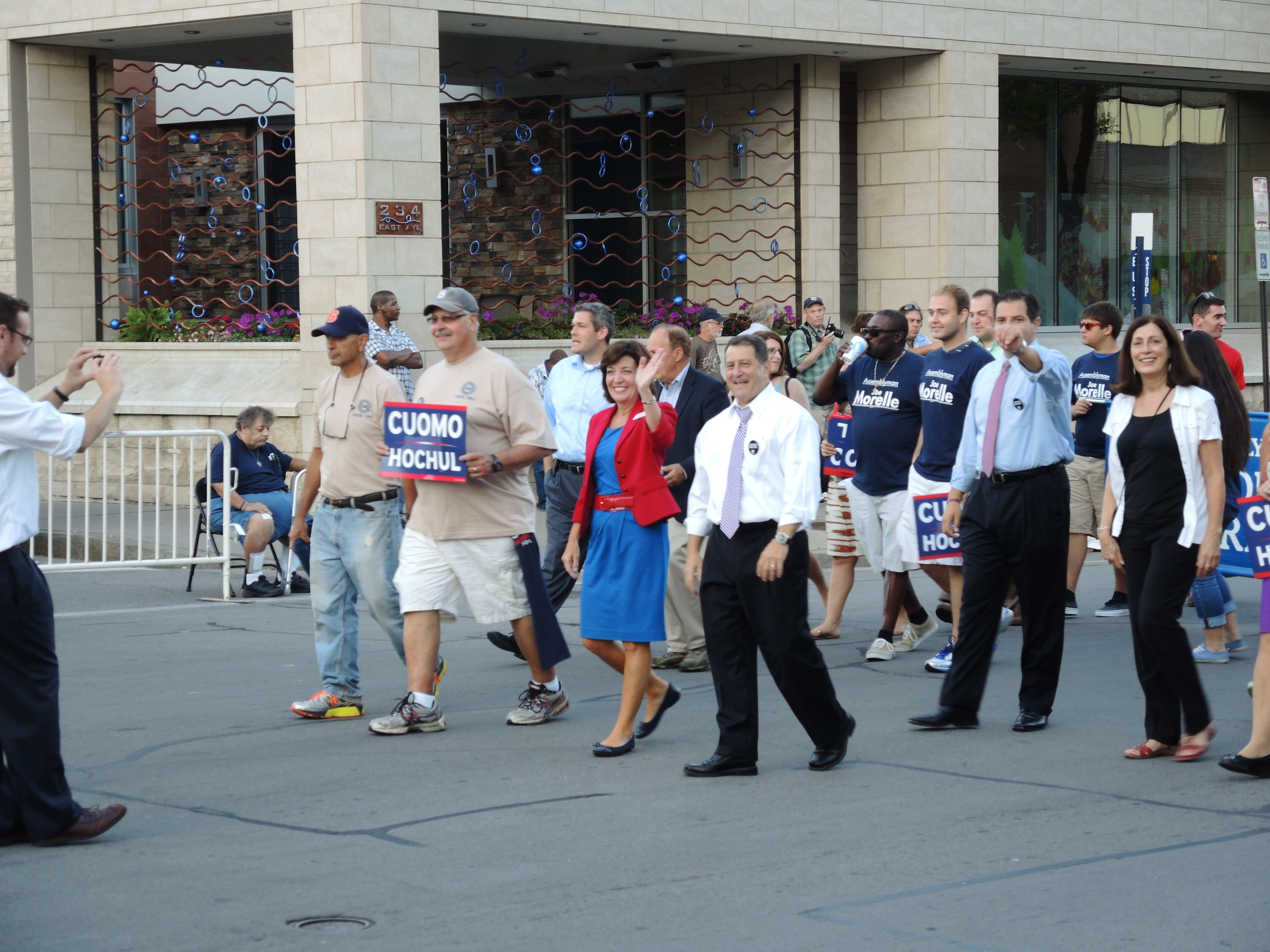
Hochul with assembly majority leader Joseph Morelle at the 2014 Labor Day parade in Rochester, New York

In 2014, Robert Duffy announced that he would not run for reelection as lieutenant governor. Incumbent Governor Andrew Cuomo was running for a second term. After Duffy's announcement, Cuomo named Hochul—who had been working as a government relations executive for M&T Bank—as his choice for lieutenant governor. On May 22, 2014, the delegates to the state Democratic convention formally endorsed Hochul for lieutenant governor.

In September, Cuomo and Hochul won their Democratic primary elections, with Hochul defeating Timothy Wu. They were also the Working Families Party nominees. (In New York, candidates for governor and lieutenant governor are nominated separately, but run as a ticket in the general election.) In November, the Cuomo/Hochul ticket won the general election. Hochul was sworn in as lieutenant governor on January 1, 2015.

==== 2018 ====
In the 2018 Democratic primary for lieutenant governor of New York, Hochul defeated Jumaane Williams, a member of the New York City Council, 53.3%–46.7%. In the November 6 general election, the Cuomo-Hochul ticket defeated the Republican ticket of Marc Molinaro and Julie Killian, 59.6%–36.2%.

=== Tenure ===
Cuomo tasked Hochul with chairing the 10 regional economic development councils that were the centerpiece of his economic development plan. He also appointed her to chair the Task Force on Heroin and Opioid Abuse and Addiction. In this capacity, she convened eight outreach sessions across New York State to hear from experts and community members in search of answers to the heroin crisis and worked to develop a comprehensive strategy for New York.

Hochul spearheaded Cuomo's "Enough is Enough" campaign to combat sexual assault on college campuses beginning in 2015, hosting and attending more than 25 events. In March 2016, Cuomo named her to the New York State Women's Suffrage 100th Anniversary Commemoration Commission.

In 2018, Hochul supported legislation to provide driver's licenses to undocumented immigrants, a policy she had opposed as Erie County Clerk in 2007. While Hochul had said in 2007 that she would seek to have any such applicants arrested if the proposal was implemented, in 2018 she said circumstances had changed.

On May 30, 2018, State Senate Democrats hoped to force a vote on an abortion rights bill known as the Reproductive Health Act. Hochul was prepared to cast a tie-breaking vote on a hostile amendment; with one Republican senator away from Albany on military duty, the Senate Republican Conference and the Senate Democratic conference each had 31 members in the chamber. But Senate Republicans "abruptly shut down business and pulled all the bills for the day" when Hochul entered the Senate chamber. She called the GOP's actions "reprehensible" and "cowardly", adding, "The governor and I are offended by the actions taken here today in the Senate."

Hochul presided over the Senate chamber on June 5, 2018, when Senate Republicans called for the override of Cuomo's veto of a bill relating to full-day kindergarten classes. The override passed by a large margin, and was the first veto override of Cuomo's gubernatorial tenure.

At a July 2018 rally with Planned Parenthood, Hochul called upon the Republican-led State Senate to reconvene in Albany to pass the Reproductive Health Act. She asserted that the potential confirmation of then-Supreme Court nominee Brett Kavanaugh made this necessary. The Act was reintroduced in January 2019 and passed that month with wide margins in the state House and Senate.

== Governor of New York (2021–present) ==
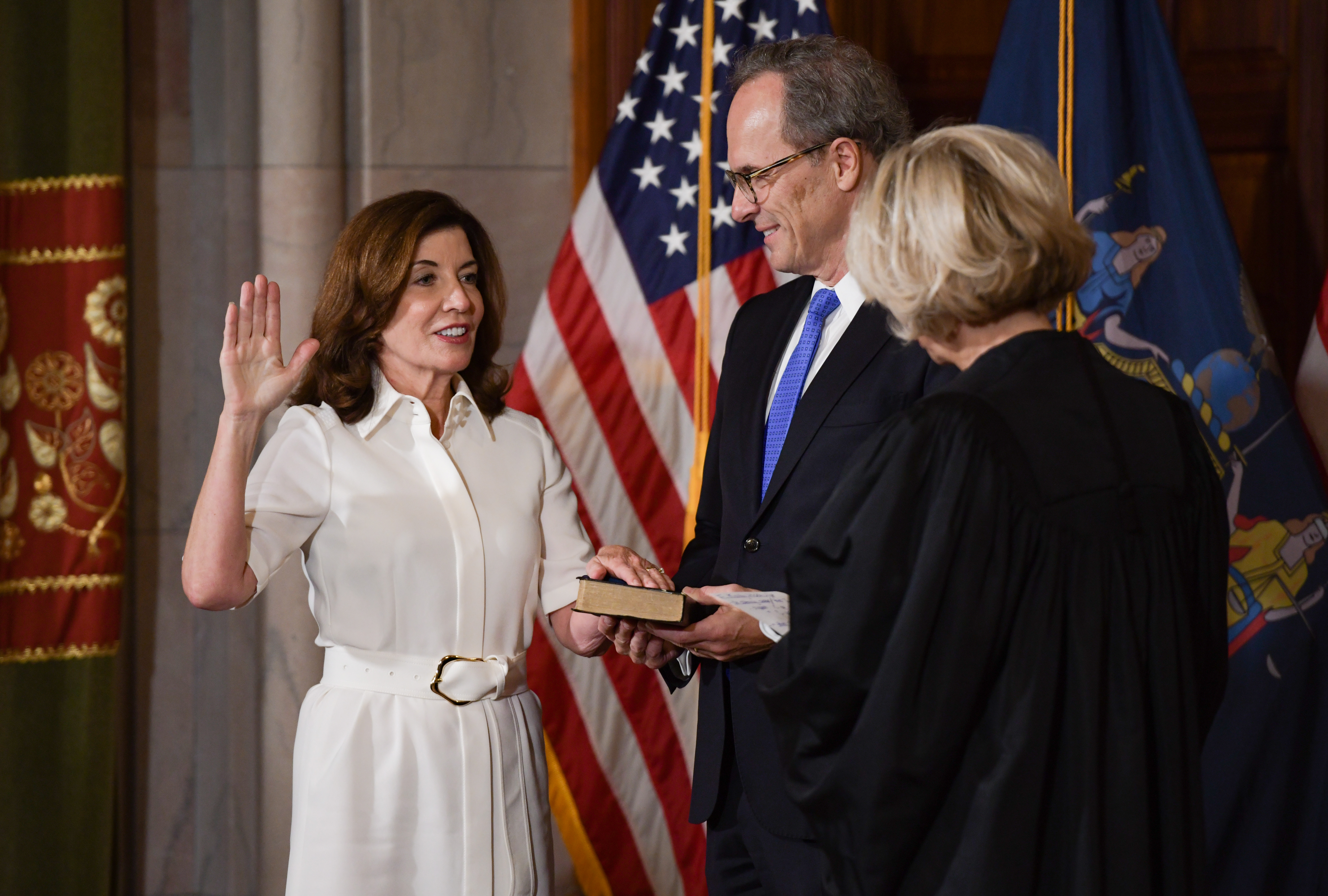
Hochul being sworn in as Governor of New York on August 24, 2021

In a press briefing on August 10, 2021, Andrew Cuomo announced his resignation as governor, effective August 24. Cuomo was accused of multiple instances of sexual misconduct. Hochul said that New York Attorney General Letitia James's report on Cuomo documented "repulsive and unlawful behavior" and praised his decision to resign. Of her time as lieutenant governor and relationship with Cuomo, Hochul has said: "I think it's very clear that the governor and I have not been close."

Hochul was sworn in as governor at 12:00 AM Eastern Time (ET) on August 24 by New York Chief Judge Janet DiFiore in a private ceremony. A public ceremonial event was held later that morning at the State Capitol's Red Room. Hochul is the state's first female governor. She is also the first New York governor from outside New York City and its immediate suburbs since 1932 (when Franklin Delano Roosevelt left office). Hochul also became the first governor from north of Hyde Park since Nathan L. Miller in 1922, in addition to being the first governor from Western New York since Horace White in 1910 and the first governor from Buffalo since Grover Cleveland in 1885. On August 12, Hochul confirmed that she planned to run for a full term as governor in 2022. She was the first Democrat to announce a 2022 gubernatorial candidacy after Cuomo said he would resign.

=== 2022 election ===
On February 17, 2022, the New York State Democratic Convention endorsed Hochul for governor. As of that month, she had raised $21 million in campaign funds. Hochul won a full term in office, defeating Republican nominee Lee Zeldin in the closest New York gubernatorial election since 1994 and the closest Democratic victory since 1982. Hochul's election marked the first time a woman was elected governor of New York.

=== Tenure ===
In August 2021, The Daily Beast and The Buffalo News reported on a potential conflict of interest between Hochul's role as governor and the high-level executive position held by her husband, William Hochul, at Delaware North, a Buffalo-based casino and hospitality company. Delaware North has stated that William Hochul will be prohibited from working on any matter that involves state business, oversight, or regulation. A spokesman for Kathy Hochul has said that she had a recusal process as lieutenant governor and would maintain that process as governor.

On August 26, 2021, Hochul appointed State Senator Brian Benjamin to the position of lieutenant governor of New York. Benjamin was sworn in on September 9, 2021. Hochul also appointed Karen Persichilli Keogh to be secretary to the governor and Kathryn Garcia to be director of state operations. In October 2021 Houchul endorsed Eric Adams in the 2021 New York City mayoral election.

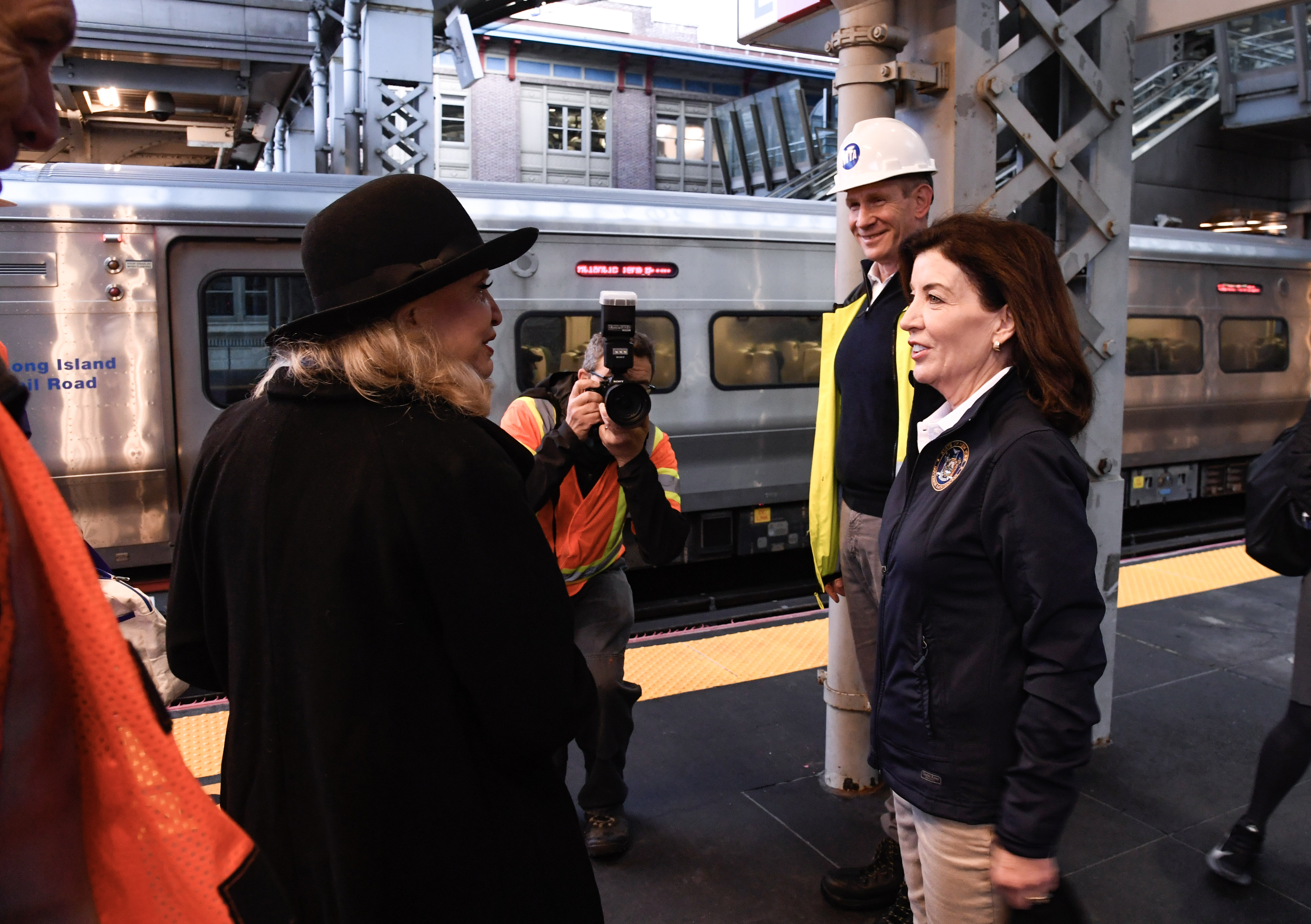
Hochul discussing East Side Access in October 2021

In November 2021, Hochul pushed to end remote work during the COVID-19 pandemic and to return workers to offices. That same month, Hochul offered her plans to redevelop Manhattan's Pennsylvania Station and the surrounding neighborhood. In her plans, she called for reducing density in the area.

In December 2021, Hochul announced the reinstatement of an indoor mask mandate amid the spread of the Omicron variant.

In January 2022, she expanded an existing vaccine mandate for healthcare workers to include a booster shot requirement. Also in January 2022, Hochul confirmed that New York's eviction moratorium would expire on January 15. She announced that she would sign on to a letter with other governors to the federal government asking for more rent assistance, after New York received only $27.2 million of its nearly $1 billion request. Tenant advocates and other politicians have pushed her and state lawmakers to pass the good cause eviction bill, which would give tenants the right to a lease renewal in most cases, cap rent increases, and require landlords to obtain a judge's order to evict tenants.

In March 2022, Hochul reached an agreement with the Buffalo Bills to have taxpayers pay $850 million for the construction of a new stadium, as well as commit to maintain and repair the stadium. It was set to be the largest taxpayer contribution ever for a National Football League facility. The agreement was released four days before the state budget was due to be passed, making it hard for lawmakers to scrutinize it. Critics of the agreement characterized it as corporate welfare. Part of the funding for the stadium came from a payment from the Seneca Nation of New York, whose bank accounts had been recently frozen as part of a long-running dispute between the Seneca Nation and the State of New York over the Seneca Nation's refusal to pay certain fees related to casino gaming despite being ordered to do so by multiple judicial bodies.

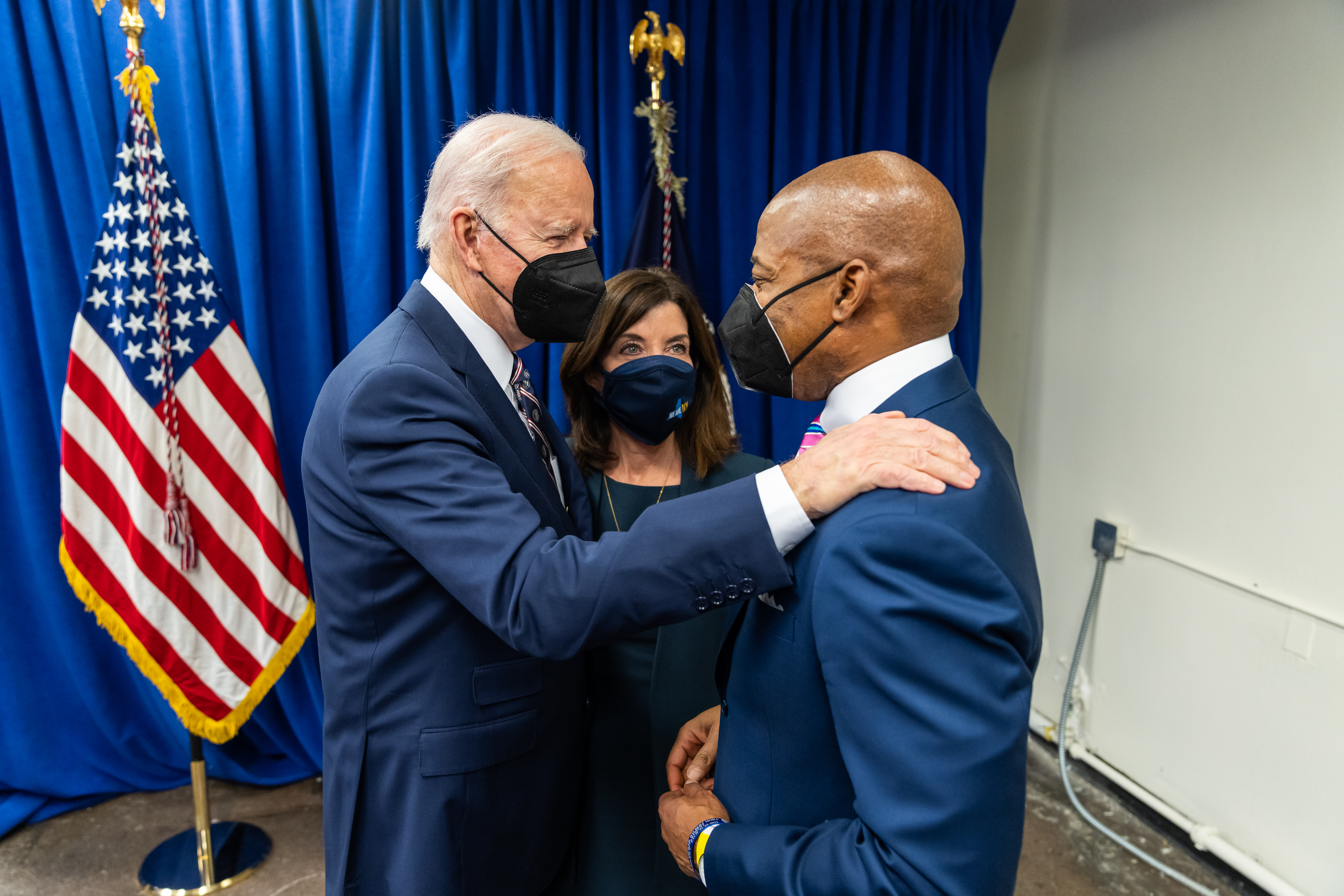
Hochul with President Joe Biden and New York City Mayor Eric Adams in February 2022

On April 12, 2022, Brian Benjamin resigned as lieutenant governor after having been indicted earlier that day on federal charges of bribery, conspiracy to commit wire fraud, wire fraud, and falsification of records. The crimes of which Benjamin is accused were allegedly committed during his State Senate tenure. He has pleaded not guilty to all charges.

On May 3, 2022, Hochul selected U.S. Representative Antonio Delgado to serve as lieutenant governor of New York. Delgado was sworn in on May 25.

On June 22, 2022, Hochul announced a $300 million plan to rebuild infrastructure in western New York communities with public and private funding.

In 2022, a citizens' group called Uniting NYS and a group of state legislators sued Hochul in the New York State Supreme Court in George M. Borrello et al. v. Kathleen C. Hochul et al. to prevent implementation of a recently created state department of health policy enabling health practitioners to refer even asymptomatic patients suspected of having been exposed to a contagious illness for possible involuntary detention backed by law enforcement, with the option of holding detainees incommunicado. The policy had been created without consulting the state legislature and did not require an emergency to be implemented. New York Supreme Court Justice Ronald Ploetz ruled against Hochul on the grounds of unconstitutionality under the separation of powers doctrine of both the state and federal constitutions, as well as on the grounds that the policy was cruel and lacked due process. The New York state attorney general and Hochul are filing an appeal to retain the regulations, and the appeal is being challenged.

In late 2022, Hochul delayed the signing of the Digital Fair Repair Act, a bill that received rare bipartisan support. The delay was allegedly due to major equipment manufacturers' lobbying efforts. On December 28, 2022, Hochul signed the Digital Fair Repair Act (Senate bill 4104-A) into law, but not before adding an amendment that equipment manufacturers "may provide assemblies of parts rather than individual components". Independent repair analysts such as Louis Rossmann have claimed these amendments undermine the bill's purpose, and allege codification into law of "unethical practices".

==== First full term ====
Hochul was inaugurated on January 1, 2023.

In 2023, Hochul nominated Hector LaSalle for the vacant position of chief judge of the New York Court of Appeals. LaSalle's nomination drew opposition from a wide variety of Democratic groups and constituencies, including numerous unions and trade groups, criminal justice advocates, elected officeholders, and local party affiliates, who raised concerns about his track record on issues relating to abortion, criminal justice, corporate interests, and the environment. Many also suggested that he would do little to stem, or could even accelerate, the Court of Appeals's rightward drift under the previous chief judge, Janet DiFiore. Despite an extensive lobbying campaign by Hochul's allies, including support from U.S. House Minority Leader Hakeem Jeffries, the Senate Judiciary Committee rejected LaSalle's nomination by a 10–9 vote. Hochul subsequently sued to demand a full floor vote. Democratic leadership then held a full Senate floor vote, which overwhelmingly rejected LaSalle's nomination. Hochul proceeded to nominate associate judge Rowan D. Wilson as chief judge and Caitlin Halligan as the replacement associate judge for Wilson. The New York Senate confirmed the nominations on April 19, 2023.

Hochul has employed consulting firms Deloitte and Boston Consulting Group in preparing her State of the State address, an arrangement that The New York Times in April 2023 called "unusual, and possibly novel". In December 2023, Hochul vetoed legislation to ban non-compete agreements. Business interests lobbied her to veto it while labor supported it, arguing that non-compete agreements harm workers' interests.

In February 2024, during the Israeli invasion of Gaza, Hochul was the keynote speaker at a United Jewish Appeal-Federation of New York event. During her speech, she made remarks implying that Israel had a right to destroy Gaza in response to the October 7, 2023, Hamas attack on Israel: "If Canada someday ever attacked Buffalo, I'm sorry, my friends, there would be no Canada the next day." Following angry responses from a wide range of parties—including public officials and the Buffalo chapter of Jewish Voice for Peace—Hochul apologized for her "inappropriate analogy".

In March 2024, Hochul instituted a policy in coordination with Eric Adams to deploy 750 National Guard soldiers to the NYC subway system and empower them to conduct random bag checks on subway-goers. She also put forth legislation to allow judges to ban criminals from riding the subway. In May 2024, Hochul was criticized for saying at a business conference that minority children growing up in the Bronx "don't even know what the word 'computer' is." She later apologized, saying she misspoke and regretted her remark.

In June 2024, Hochul indefinitely halted implementation of a congestion pricing plan in the most congested parts of Manhattan just weeks before it was to go into effect. The plan was approved in 2019 and was expected to bring in $1 billion in revenue per year, making it the MTA's largest source of funding. At the time of the cancellation, the MTA had already purchased $500 million for equipment needed for congestion pricing and earmarked $15 billion for projects it expected to fund with the revenue. Hochul proposed raising the city's payroll tax for business owners to cover the lost revenue from the cancellation of the congestion pricing, which New York lawmakers declined to consider. Her decision received widespread backlash, especially from state lawmakers, business leaders, and climate activists. Hochul defended her sudden decision to block the congestion pricing plan based in part on conversations with New Yorkers, particularly from a Manhattan diner, and said the plan would "suck the vitality out of this city when we're still fighting for our comeback". Lawmakers said her plan to raise payroll taxes to cover the lost revenue ran contrary to her reason for halting the program and that the sudden tax hike would incapacitate the city's post-COVID-19 economic recovery. Democratic Senate Deputy Leader Michael Gianaris condemned how the program was derailed "at the last possible moment" before giving lawmakers less than 48 hours to create an alternative funding plan, calling it "irresponsible" and "inconsistent with principles of good governance". Senator Zellnor Myrie called it "incomprehensible" that Hochul claimed to care about cost of living while proposing a tax hike. In November 2024, Hochul revived the congestion pricing plan with the charge for most passenger vehicles reduced from $15 to $9; it was implemented on January 5, 2025.

In June 2024, Hochul proposed banning face masks on the New York City Subway in response to groups of protesters she said were conducting antisemitic acts and confronting people while covering their faces. Organizations such as the New York Civil Liberties Union criticized the proposal as a means to target protesters who hide their identities to avoid legal or professional repercussions, saying it would be selectively used to "arrest, doxx, surveil, and silence people of color and protesters the police disagree with".

In July 2024, Hochul said she intends to run for reelection as governor in 2026.

In September 2024, Hochul signed The Retail Worker Safety Act. In December 2024, Hochul vetoed a bill sponsored by Senator Joseph Addabbo Jr. that would speed up the licensing of three new casinos in Queens and signed a law capping out-of-pocket costs for EpiPens at $100 yearly.

In January 2025, Hochul announced a proposal to provide free tuition for specific associate degree programs at State and City University of New York schools. In February, she refused an extradition request from Louisiana for a New York doctor who had been indicted in Louisiana after mailing abortion pills to a woman in Louisiana, who allegedly forced her pregnant minor daughter to take them. Also in 2025, Hochul directed CUNY to take down a job listing for a Palestinian studies teaching position at Hunter College. In December 2025, Ontario premier Doug Ford and Hochul signed a memorandum of understanding that made the New York Power Authority and Ontario Power Generation work together to advance nuclear energy technology.

Hochul did not endorse anyone in the 2025 New York City Democratic mayoral primary. On September 14, 2025, she endorsed Democratic nominee Zohran Mamdani in the general election. On January 8, 2026, Mamdani and Hochul announced a plan to increase spending by $1.7 billion to provide universal pre-kindergarten statewide and universal 3K care in New York City, create a free childcare program for two-year-olds in New York City, and expand childcare subsidies.

Time magazine listed Hochul as one of its top 100 climate leaders in its "Time100 Climate 2025". Hochul wrote in Time that New York will not wait for the federal government to ensure a cleaner and greener environment, saying: "Since I took office in 2021, we have seen once-in-a-century storms become routine. It is up to all of us to work together to reverse this for the good of all of us, our children, and their children. Time is running short. But we must address this critical situation in a way that ensures affordability for those paying the rates and grid reliability so the lights and heat stay on."

In January 2026, Hochul signed an executive order allowing hospitals to break the 2026 New York City nurses strike by hiring staff in their place. Travel nurses said that during this period they worked $9,000 week-long contracts, and hospitals spent $100,000 hiring strikebreakers. Striking nurses marched on Hochul's office in protest, but she extended her order several times, citing patient safety issues. Many nurses criticized her for alleviating pressure on hospitals during the strike. Nurses at the Mount Sinai and Montefiore systems reached a three-year contract agreement on February 9. Nurses at NewYork-Presbyterian Hospital reached a three-year contract agreement on February 20.

On May 29, 2026, Governor Kathy Hochul signed legislation banning law enforcement officers, including ICE agents, from wearing masks while in public in New York state as part of the broader immigration package aimed at restricting ICE operations in the state. The package created provisions allowing New Yorkers to sue federal, state, and local officials for alleged constitutional violations. The Department of Homeland Security quickly announced they would not comply with the mask ban and accused Hochul of obstructing immigration enforcement.

In June 2026, Hochul launched an exploratory committee to study a potential joint New York City-Lake Placid bid for the 2042 Winter Olympics.

== Political positions ==
=== Energy ===
During her 2011 congressional campaign, Hochul favored offering incentives to develop alternative energy.

In June 2011, Hochul opposed legislation that would cut funding for the Commodity Futures Trading Commission (CFTC) by 44%, on the grounds that the CFTC curbs speculation in oil and the resulting layoffs of CFTC personnel would "make it easier for Big Oil companies and speculators to take advantage of ... consumers".

=== Fiscal policy ===
While running for Congress in 2011, Hochul supported raising taxes on those making more than $500,000 per year. She acknowledged during her campaign that substantial cuts must be made in the federal budget, and said she would consider cuts in all entitlement programs. But she expressed opposition to the Republican plan that would turn Medicare into a voucher system, saying it "would end Medicare as we know it". She said money could be saved in the Medicare program by eliminating waste and purchasing prescription drugs in bulk, and that the creation of more jobs would alleviate Medicare and Social Security budget shortfalls due to increased collections of payroll taxes.

As a member of Congress, Hochul voted for a balanced budget amendment, which she called "a bipartisan solution".

In July 2023, in response to a statewide workforce shortage, Governor Hochul waived exam application fees for all New York State civil service exams through the end of 2025 to make it easier to join the state workforce.

=== Health care ===
Hochul expressed support for the Affordable Care Act passed by the 111th Congress and said during her 2011 campaign that she would not vote to repeal it. In response to a constituent's question during a town hall meeting in February 2012, she was booed for saying that the federal government was "not looking to the Constitution" under the Obama administration requirement that employers provide their workers with insurance coverage for birth control. A spokesman later said she had misspoken, but did not clarify her answer.

Hochul has said she is pro-choice and called the overturning of Roe v. Wade a "grave injustice".

=== Immigration ===
In 2023, Hochul advocated that the federal government expedite work permits to migrants to address a surge of immigration to New York, writing to President Joe Biden, "For me, the answer to these two crises—a humanitarian crisis and our workforce crisis—is so crystal clear and common sense. Let them get the work authorizations; let them work; legally, let them work."

On February 12, 2025, U.S. Attorney General Pam Bondi announced that the Department of Justice was suing Hochul and other New York officials, such as Letitia James, over their handling of immigration issues. On April 16, 2026, the Associated Press reported that New York would lose nearly $73 million for refusing to revoke over 33,000 commercial driver's licenses flagged by the Department of Transportation.

=== Trade ===
On September 17, 2011, Robert J. McCarthy noted that Hochul and her election opponent Jack Davis both opposed free trade. "We saw what happened with NAFTA; the promises never materialized", Hochul said of the North American Free Trade Agreement. "If I have to stand up to my own party on this, I'm willing to do so." She opposed new free trade agreements then under consideration, saying, "We don't need to look any further than Western New York to see that these policies do not work." She believes that free trade agreements such as NAFTA and CAFTA have suppressed U.S. wages and benefits and caused job loss in the United States.

Hochul has vocally opposed tariffs imposed during Donald Trump's second term, especially those directed at Canada. She said the tariffs amount to a 21% tax on imported goods and cost New York families $4,200 a year while reducing Canadian tourism by 400,000 visitors from 2024 to 2025. In April 2025, New York and 11 other states sued the federal government to block the tariffs. On June 16, Hochul and other Northeastern governors convened with five Canadian premiers in Boston to discuss the impact of Trump's tariffs on their economies. Hochul stressed the need for U.S. governors and Canadian premiers to work together and forge new alliances against Trump's tariffs, to ensure economic growth for both countries.

On June 29, 2026, Hochul announced a $30 million state relief program aimed at insulating New York farmers from the effects of federal tariffs.

=== Guns ===
The Niagara Frontier reported that, during her time as County Clerk, gun rights advocates noted Hochul's expedited approval for gun permits. She was endorsed by the NRA Political Victory Fund (NRA-PVF) with an "A" rating in 2012. Her stance has evolved since then and New York has been called a leader on gun control by Everytown for Gun Safety. Hochul signed legislation in 2022 that raised the age for buying a semiautomatic rifle and prohibited the carrying of handguns in many public spaces in response to the Bruen Decision. Most of the law was upheld in 2023, when a federal court ruled New York may ban guns in parks, schools, and other areas public officials deem high-risk. Hochul's critics have accused New York of Soviet-style gun control, especially with regard to 3D printing.

== Personal life ==
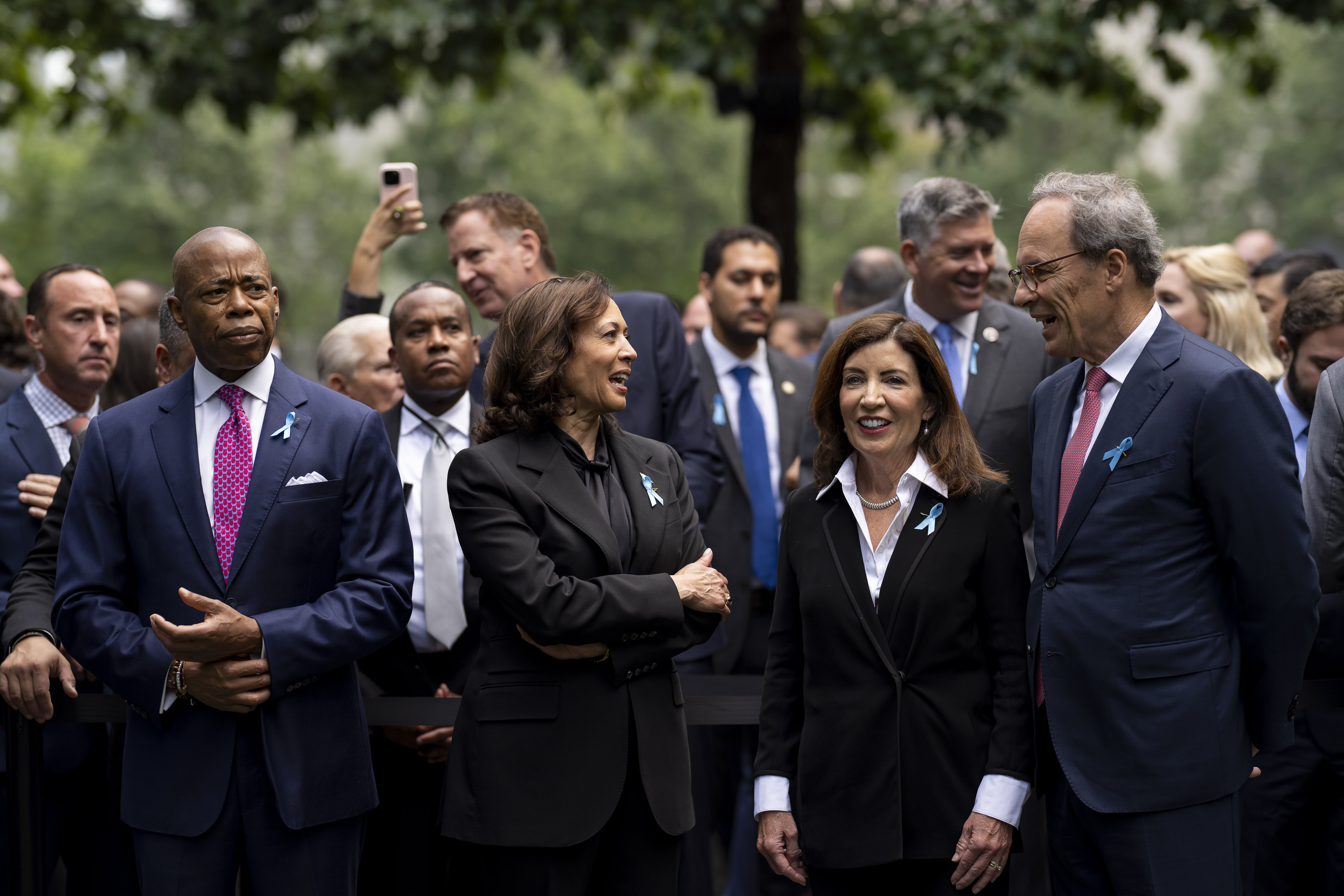
Kathy Hochul with her husband William J. Hochul Jr., Vice President Kamala Harris, and Mayor Eric Adams in September 2023

Hochul is married to William J. Hochul Jr., the former United States Attorney for the Western District of New York, who is also the senior vice president, general counsel, and secretary to Delaware North, a hospitality and gambling company. They have two children named William and Caitlin. Hochul is Catholic.

Hochul is a founder of Kathleen Mary House, a transitional home for women and children who are victims of domestic violence. She has served on the organization's board. She also co-founded the Village Action Coalition, and, as of 2011, was a member of the board of trustees of Immaculata Academy in Hamburg, New York.

In 2024, Hochul was diagnosed with a basal-cell carcinoma, a common form of skin cancer, on her nose. She underwent surgery to remove it in the same year.

== Electoral history ==
Special election May 24, 2011, U.S. House of Representatives, NY-26
Party	Candidate	Votes	%
Democratic	Kathy Courtney Hochul	47,519	42.58
Working Families	Kathy Courtney Hochul	5,194	4.65
Total	Kathy Courtney Hochul	52,713	47.24
Republican	Jane L. Corwin	35,721	32.01
Conservative	Jane L. Corwin	9,090	8.15
Independence	Jane L. Corwin	2,376	2.13
Total	Jane L. Corwin	47,187	42.28
Tea Party	Jack Davis	10,029	8.99
Green	Ian L. Murphy	1,177	1.05
	Blank and void	259	0.23
	Scattering	232	0.21
Total votes		111,597	100.0
Turnout			
Democratic gain from Republican			

New York's 27th congressional district, 2012
Party	Candidate	Votes	%
Republican	Chris Collins	137,250	43.2
Conservative	Chris Collins	23,970	7.6
Total	Chris Collins	161,220	50.8
Democratic	Kathy Hochul	140,008	44.1
Working Families	Kathy Hochul	16,211	5.1
Total	Kathy Hochul (incumbent)	156,219	49.2
Total votes		317,439	100.0
Republican gain from Democratic			

2014 Democratic primary results Lieutenant Governor of New York
Party	Candidate	Votes	%
Democratic	Kathy Hochul	329,089	60.20%
Democratic	Tim Wu	217,614	39.80%
Total votes		546,703	100.00%

2018 Democratic primary results Lieutenant Governor of New York
Party	Candidate	Votes	%
Democratic	Kathy Hochul (incumbent)	733,591	53.3%
Democratic	Jumaane Williams	641,633	46.7%
Total votes		1,375,224	100%

2022 Democratic primary results Governor of New York
Party	Candidate	Votes	%
Democratic	Kathy Hochul (incumbent)	575,067	67.6
Democratic	Jumaane Williams	164,410	19.3
Democratic	Thomas Suozzi	111,000	13.1
Total votes		850,477	100

2022 New York gubernatorial election
Party	Candidate	Votes	%	±%
Democratic	Kathy Hochul; Antonio Delgado	2,879,092	48.77%	−7.39%
Working Families	Kathy Hochul; Antonio Delgado	261,323	4.33%	+2.45%
Total	Kathy Hochul (incumbent); Antonio Delgado (incumbent)	3,140,415	53.20%	−6.42%
Republican	Lee Zeldin; Alison Esposito	2,449,394	41.49%	+9.89%
Conservative	Lee Zeldin; Alison Esposito	313,187	5.31%	+1.15%
Total	Lee Zeldin; Alison Esposito	2,762,581	46.80%	+10.59%
Total votes		5,788,802	100.0%	
Turnout		5,902,996	47.74%	
Registered electors		12,124,242		
Democratic hold				

== See also ==
- List of current United States governors
- List of female governors in the United States
- List of female lieutenant governors in the United States
- Women in the United States House of Representatives

== Notes ==
U.S. House of Representatives
Preceded by Chris Lee	Member of the U.S. House of Representatives from New York's 26th congressional district 2011–2013	Succeeded by Brian Higgins
Party political offices
Preceded by Robert Duffy	Democratic nominee for Lieutenant Governor of New York; 2014, 2018	Succeeded by Antonio Delgado
Preceded by Andrew Cuomo	Democratic nominee for Governor of New York; 2022, 2026	Most recent
Political offices
Preceded by Robert Duffy	Lieutenant Governor of New York; 2015–2021	Succeeded by Andrea Stewart-Cousins; Acting
Preceded by Andrew Cuomo	Governor of New York; 2021–present	Incumbent
U.S. order of precedence (ceremonial)
Preceded by JD Vance as Vice President	Order of precedence of the United States; Within New York	Succeeded by Mayor of city in which event is held
Preceded by JD Vance as Vice President	Order of precedence of the United States; Within New York	Succeeded by Otherwise Mike Johnson as Speaker of the House
Preceded by Abigail Spanberger as Governor of Virginia	Order of precedence of the United States; Outside New York	Succeeded by Josh Stein as Governor of North Carolina
