= Colia Clark =

American political activist (1940–2022)

Colia L. Liddell Lafayette Clark (July 21, 1940 – November 4, 2022) was an American activist and politician. Clark was the Green Party's candidate for the United States Senate in New York in 2010 and 2012.

Clark was a veteran of the civil rights, black power, and pan-African movements. She was a field secretary for the Student Nonviolent Coordinating Committee and played a key role establishing equal voting rights in Selma, Alabama. She was also an organizer with the Birmingham campaign, as well as throughout Mississippi. Her work included activism in the fields of women's rights and workers' rights, as well as activism and advocacy for homeless people and youth. She worked with the Cynthia McKinney for president campaign, with "Power to the People". Clark was a member of the Reconstruction Party (USA), and was a chair of Grandmothers for the Release of Mumia Abu-Jamal.

== Civil rights ==
Clark was a student at Tougaloo College, an historically black college in Tougaloo, Mississippi, when she became involved with the civil rights movement. An activist with the NAACP, she was involved with voter registration efforts. Under the guidance of Medgar Evers and John Salter, Clark founded the NAACP Youth Council in North Jackson, Mississippi.

While working with the NAACP, she became special assistant to Medgar Evers, field secretary for the NAACP. In 1962 Clark resigned from the NAACP and joined the Student Nonviolent Coordinating Committee (SNCC) to do voter registration work alongside her then husband, Bernard Lafayette, in Alabama. This project laid essential groundwork for the Selma voting rights campaign of 1965. She was eventually named executive secretary of SNCC. She also participated in street demonstrations and experienced police brutality in the Birmingham campaign of 1963.

In 1964, she helped found the Southern Organizing Committee at Fisk University. She was an organizer in the Black Power movement, including the Republic of New Afrika. By early 1973, she returned to Mississippi and worked on a number of other projects including the editorship of the Jackson Advocate.

Clark was critical of the way in which the civil rights movement was portrayed in popular media, particularly in the film Selma, arguing it belittles student activism and does nothing to address the legacy of inequality. She was a vocal supporter of the Black Lives Matter movement, seeing it (along with the Black Power movement) as a successor to the civil rights movement.

== Green Party ==
Clark was co-chair of the New York delegation to the Green Party of the United States presidential nominating convention, where Cynthia McKinney was nominated as the Green Party presidential candidate. In her final years Clark focused on writing, activism and advocacy about Haiti.

== Education ==
Clark attended Tougaloo College and earned a M.A. from Albany State University in Albany, GA, where she later worked as a professor. She was also a professor at SUNY Albany, Albany, NY

== Personal life and death ==
Clark died on November 4, 2022, at the age of 82.
