= Black & Asian Democratic Caucus =

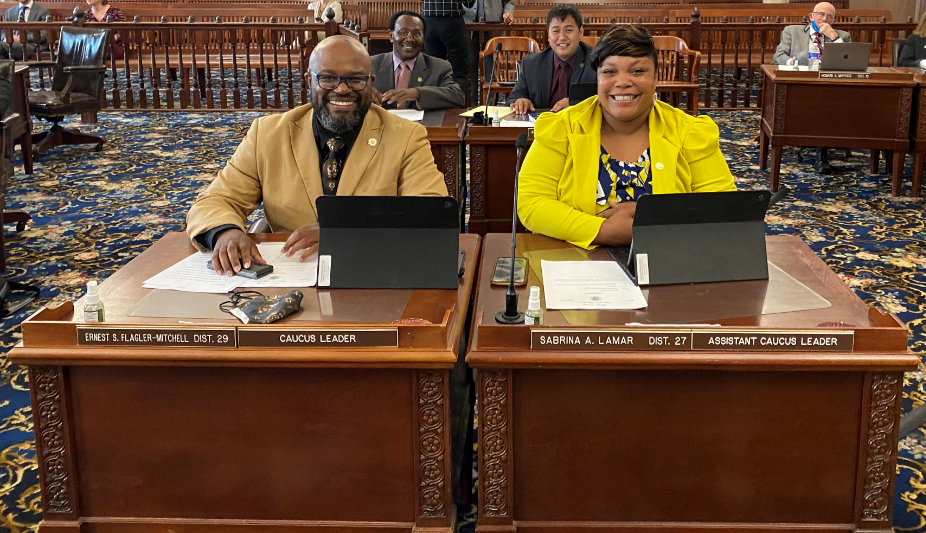
- Former Members: Ernest Flagler-Mitchell; Sabrina LaMar; Frank Keophetlasy; Calvin Lee, Jr.
- Founded: September 14, 2020
- Dissolved: December 31, 2021
- Headquarters: Rochester, New York
- Ideology: Social justice Civil rights

Website
- badc.godaddysites.com

The Black & Asian Democratic Caucus was a group of County Legislators in Monroe County, New York that broke away from the Democratic Caucus of the County Legislature in 2020. The claimed rationale behind the split was that the majority of Monroe County Democrats had taken their constituents in the city of Rochester for granted and it was time for them to exercise power on their own. In the time following the formation of the Black & Asian Democratic Caucus, they submitted legislation that otherwise would not have been considered. It was not an officially recognized party by the New York State Board of Elections but rather a Caucus established through a process outlined in the Rules of the Legislature of the County of Monroe. The stated mission of the Caucus was to advocate for the interests of Black, Indigenous, and People of Color (BIPOC) within Monroe County and strive to eliminate the obstacles that structural racism has exacerbated by championing equity and equality to eliminate disparities between racial and ethnic groups. Their motto was "Purpose over Party."

During the 2020-21 session of the County Legislature, Caucus members submitted legislation meant to enhance the quality of life of less fortunate residents of the county, especially in their districts in the City of Rochester. One such submission was Gantt's Law, named after the late Rochester Assemblyman David Gantt, which creates a process to ensure that minority and women-owned businesses have guaranteed consideration for County contracts and creates a directory of MWBEs. Other resolutions originating with the Caucus include the Dignified Indigent Burial Act, which provides financial assistance to residents of Monroe County to help pay their last respects to loved ones, a resolution providing funding for minority-owned fine arts groups harmed by the COVID-19 pandemic, and a local law stiffening penalties for illegal ATV use on regular streets in Monroe County. They also supported the effort to rename the Greater Rochester International Airport in honor of local abolitionist icon Frederick Douglass, calling it the "Frederick Douglass - Greater Rochester International Airport." and later provided funding for a mural to be created in the airport of a letter from Douglass to fellow abolitionist Harriet Tubman. In order to get the funding for minority-owned fine arts groups to become law, the Caucus joined with other Legislators to override a veto by Monroe County Executive Adam Bello, the third veto override that they had been a part of in the term.

== Dissolution ==
=== 2021 Monroe County Elections ===
Two of the four members lost in the 2021 Monroe County Democratic Primary Elections. Flager-Mitchell lost 35.1% to William Burgess, while Keophetlasy lost 23.9% to Ricky G. Frazier. Lamar ran unopposed, while Lee did not seek re-election. Vince Felder, an unofficial member, also lost his re-election bid to the legislature. Mayor Lovely A. Warren, a political ally, lost her re-election bid as well.

In January 2022, Legislator Lamar would make a deal with Republicans to become the first Black woman to serve as President of the Legislature.

In 2023, she would lose her re-election campaign to Rose Bonnick by more than 60% of the vote.
