= Ian Murphy (writer) =

American journalist

- Murphy in 2012
- Born: Ian Larry Murphy; October 31, 1978; Buffalo, New York, U.S.
- Died: July 16, 2019 (aged 40)
- Occupation: Writer
- Employer(s): The Beast (formerly, The Buffalo Beast); The Progressive
- Political party: Green Party

Ian Larry Murphy (October 31, 1978 – July 16, 2019) was an American alternative journalist and satirist who was an editor and reporter for The Beast, an alternative, online newspaper based in Buffalo, New York. He was the Green Party nominee for the U.S. House of Representatives, NY-26 district election in early 2011.

== Life and career ==
Murphy, a native of the Buffalo area, gained national attention in February 2011 for prank-calling Wisconsin Republican governor Scott Walker while claiming to be billionaire David Koch, and posting a recording of the conversation online. The conversation was said to reveal Walker's plots to defeat Democrats on a budget standoff and Walker's willingness to cooperate with wealthy donors to quash public sector labor unions.

Shortly after the Koch prank, Murphy became the Green Party candidate in the New York's 26th congressional district special election to replace Republican Chris Lee who had resigned after sending a shirtless picture of himself to a woman on Craigslist. According to the Green Party of New York state, Murphy ran to challenge the "anti-worker, pro-war, pro-corporate, anti-environmental agenda of the Democrats and Republicans." During the campaign, Murphy created a satirical website using the name of rival Republican candidate, Jane Corwin, in the URL. Murphy was excluded from participation in the televised candidate debates—in one case because he had previously insulted the debate moderator in one of his Buffalo Beast articles. The Green Party objected to the TV station's action saying it denied voters their First Amendment right to hear the views of all the candidates. Just 25 percent of registered voters turned out for the off-season election, despite national media attention. Democrat Kathy Hochul won, and Murphy finished last in the four-way race with about 1 percent of the vote.

In July 2019, former staff at the Buffalo Beast reported that Murphy died.

== Controversy and criticisms ==
In 2007 Murphy wrote a column which purported to be an undercover report from the Creation Museum entitled "Let There Be Retards". He drew the ire of conservatives with his May, 2008 editorial entitled, "Fuck the Troops".

In February 2011 Murphy prank-called newly elected Wisconsin governor Scott Walker posing as David H. Koch, a wealthy Walker campaign contributor and funder of anti-union efforts in Wisconsin and other states. During the secretly recorded call, Walker discussed possible plans to trick absent Democratic lawmakers back to Wisconsin to obtain a quorum for the passage of the controversial anti-union legislation. Murphy posted the recording on The Beast, obtaining national attention, a cult hero's welcome at the Wisconsin protests and an appearance on MSNBC. The governor's office confirmed that the call occurred. Koch later told the conservative Weekly Standard he considered the prank call and posting of the secret recording comparable to identity theft.

In late July 2011, Murphy was charged with disorderly conduct during an outdoor anti-gay marriage protest after he allegedly "directed a sex toy toward officers and told them that it was a microphone", according to the police report summary. Murphy later posted the actual charge which was "disrupting a religious service", and denied the charges saying he was arrested for filming the actions of police officers—with his camera being confiscated and erased.

== See also ==
- Freedom of the press in the United States
