= The Beast (newspaper) =

Biweekly newspaper in Buffalo, New York

- Type: Alternative weekly
- Format: Tabloid
- Owner: Independent
- Publisher: Paul Fallon
- Editor: Ian Murphy
- Founded: March 15, 2002; 24 years ago
- Ceased publication: 2009 (print); 2013 (online)
- Headquarters: Buffalo, New York, U.S.

The Beast was an alternative biweekly print newspaper published in Buffalo, New York, from 2002 until 2009 and then exclusively online until about 2013.

== History ==
The Beast was founded by Matt Taibbi, Kevin McElwee, and Paul Fallon in 2002. (Taibbi and McElwee had previously collaborated on The eXile.) It was originally a free biweekly newspaper.

In 2007, the publication began to charge for issues as a national monthly publication that also offered international subscriptions. In late 2009, The Beast stopped producing print editions but maintained an online presence with the tagline: "The World's Only Website". The Beast's longest-serving editor was Allan Uthman.

An annual feature of The Beast was "The 50 Most Loathsome Americans" – a list of infamous celebrities, authors, athletes, pundits, politicians, and others selected for their dubious distinction, with reasons and examples given for each entry's inclusion.

On February 23, 2011, editor Ian Murphy placed a prank telephone call to Governor Scott Walker of Wisconsin during the 2011 Wisconsin budget protests.

The Beast website closed in 2013.
