= Robert J. McCarthy =

American businessman

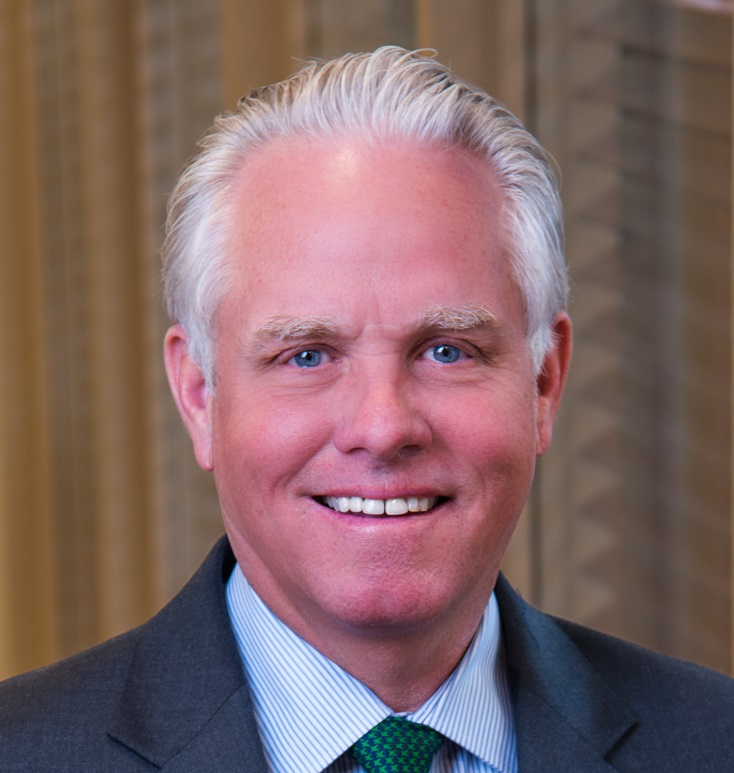
- Other name: Bob McCarthy
- Education: Villanova University; University of Pennsylvania
- Occupation: Hotelier
- Board member of: Santander consumer USA, RLJ Lodging Trust, Hotel Development Partners (HDP), ServiceSource Foundation, Villanova University

Robert J. "Bob" McCarthy is an American hotel executive who is the founder and chairman of McCarthy Investments LLC. He is the former Chief Operations Officer of Marriott International. McCarthy is chairman of Hotel Development Partners LLC, a hotel developer focused on Marriott and Hilton brands.

== Career and education ==
McCarthy began his career as a waiter in a Marriott restaurant in 1975. In 1982, he was a regional director of sales and marketing for Marriott Hotels, Resorts and Suites, director of marketing for Marriott Suite Hotels/Compact Hotels in 1985, then vice president, operations and marketing, for Fairfield Inn in 1987 and vice president, operations, for Courtyard/Fairfield Inn in 1991 and senior vice president for the Northeast region for Marriott Lodging from 1995 to 2000. Later he was appointed as executive vice-president of operations for Marriott from 2000 to 2003; as an executive vice president and then president of North American lodging operations at Marriott International Inc. from 2003 to 2009 and group president from 2009 until February 2012. He served as the chief operations officer of Marriott International, Inc. from March 31, 2012 to February 2014.

He retired from Marriott International in March 2014, where he spent 38 years and oversaw Global Lodging Services, The Ritz Carlton, and shared reporting responsibilities for Marriott’s four continental operating divisions.

=== Affiliations to Boards and Organizations ===
- McCarthy founded McCarthy Investments, LLC in 2014 and serves as its chairman. In September 2014 he was appointed chairman of Atlanta-based Hotel Development Partners (HDP). McCarthy is also an investor and board member of MeetingPlay, a technology company serving the hospitality industry. He is also a partner and an advisor in Armature Works, a Washington, D.C. project.
- McCarthy was appointed to the board of trustees of RLJ Lodging Trust in February 2018, where he serves on the nominating and corporate governance committee.
- He served as the chairman of the board of managers and member of the board of managers of Avendra, LLC.
- He has been an independent director of Santander Consumer USA Holdings Inc. since July 15, 2015 where he serves on the audit and compensation committees and leads the regulatory and compliance oversight committee.
- McCarthy served as a director of the ServiceSource Foundation an organization supporting people with disabilities.
- He currently serves as a member of the board of trustees of Villanova University. He previously served as a member of the Villanova University Business School board and the advisory board at the Cornell University School of Hotel Administration.
- He serves as a strategic advisor and investor to Lytical Ventures, a fund focused on cyber security/corporate intelligence opportunities.

=== Education ===
McCarthy holds a Bachelor's degree in Business Administration from Villanova University in Villanova, PA and is a graduate of the Advanced Management Program at the Wharton School of Business at the University of Pennsylvania.
