= Green Party of New York =

New York affiliate of the Green Party

- Chairperson: Eric Jones; Peter LaVenia
- Founded: 1992; 34 years ago
- Headquarters: 87 Montrose Avenue Unit 2, Brooklyn, New York 11237
- Membership (2026): ▼15,445
- Ideology: Green politics
- Political position: Left-wing
- National affiliation: Green Party
- Colors: Green
- New York State Assembly: 0 / 150
- New York State Senate: 0 / 63
- New York City Council: 0 / 51
- Other elected offices: 2 (June 2019)
- Appointed offices: 3 (June 2019)

Website
- gpny.org

The Green Party of New York is the affiliate of the Green Party of the United States in the U.S. state of New York. It was founded in 1992 and is a part of the Green Party movement. The Party has had ballot access at various points in its history.

== History ==
The Green Party of New York is the affiliate of the Green Party of the United States in the U.S. state of New York. The Green Party of New York had its roots in local Green organizing of the mid-1980s. It was founded in 1992 and is a part of the Green Party movement. In 1998, the Green Party in New York achieved ballot status when its candidate for governor, Al Lewis, received over 50,000 votes. Ralph Nader received 244,030 votes for President on the Green Party line in 2000. As provided under electoral law, the party formed a State Committee, several County Committees, and set up county organizations. The party lost ballot status in 2002, when gubernatorial candidate Stanley Aronowitz received 41,727 votes, fewer than the 50,000 votes required.

From 2003 to 2004, the Green Party had a city council majority (3 of 5 seats), in the Village of New Paltz. This was the third-ever Green city council majority in the United States. New Paltz also elected a Green mayor Jason West in 2003.

The party's petition for the 2004 Presidential election was successfully challenged, and no Green Party candidate appeared on the ballot in 2004. National Green Party nominee David Cobb received 138 votes in New York as a write-in candidate. Meanwhile, Nader received 99,873 votes, appearing on the "Peace and Justice Party" and the "Independence Party" ballot lines. The party has appeared on the presidential ballot every election year since then.

In the 2006 election, the party nominated Malachy McCourt for governor and failed to obtain ballot status by garnering only 40,729 votes, less than the required 50,000. Down-ticket candidates Rachel Treichler for Attorney General and Julia Willebrand for Comptroller fared better, but these votes do not count towards earning ballot status, and neither of these candidates were elected. The party also nominated Howie Hawkins for Senate who criticized incumbent Democrat Hillary Clinton for, among other things, supporting the Iraq War.

The party regained ballot status for four years when Howie Hawkins received over 50,000 votes in the 2010 gubernatorial election and retained it for another four years in the 2014 election, when the party moved up to line D, the fourth line on state ballots, passing the Working Families and Independence parties, with 5 percent of the vote. It lost its status as a ballot-qualified political party in New York as of November 2020 when the law governing ballot access was changed requiring a larger number of votes in the Presidential and Gubernatorial elections.

== Nominated candidates ==
=== Presidential ===
- The Green Party candidate for president in 2008 was former Georgia congresswomen Cynthia McKinney, who ran with hip-hop activist and New York resident Rosa Clemente as her vice-presidential nominee. The all-woman of color ticket received 12,729 votes in New York.
- Green Party nominee Dr. Jill Stein and homeless advocate Cheri Honkala of Pennsylvania earned 39,982 (.56%) in 2012. Stein would go on to receive 107,934 votes (1.4%) in 2016 with Ajamu Baraka as her running mate.
- In the 2020 United States presidential election, Green Party nominee Howie Hawkins won 32,832 votes (0.38%).

=== Congressional ===
- In 2010 Colia Clark ran for Senator of New York against Chuck Schumer, and in 2012 she ran against Kirsten Gillibrand. In 2016, Robin Laverne Wilson ran against Chuck Schumer.
- Ian Murphy ran as the Green Party candidate for New York's 26th congressional district special election, 2011. Ian Murphy lost and Kathy Hochul was elected. The seat was vacated by Chris Lee who resigned amid a scandal involving his response to a personal ad on Craigslist and the transmittal of shirtless photos. Murphy finished in last place in the four-candidate field.

=== Gubernatorial ===
- Howie Hawkins ran as the Green Party candidate for Governor of New York in the 2010 race, against six other candidates. His running mate was Gloria Mattera, of Brooklyn.
- Hawkins ran again in the 2014 Gubernatorial election against four other candidates receiving 5% of the vote.
- Brian Jones, a socialist actor and activist from New York City, was the party nominee for Lieutenant Governor of New York in 2014.

=== Municipal ===
- Dr. Alice Green received 5,448 votes in the Albany, NY General Election for mayor in 2005, against incumbent Mayor Gerald Jennings.
- Billy Talen ran for Mayor of New York City in 2009 as the Green Party candidate. He received 8,902 (0.8%) votes.
- Alex White received approximately 9% of the vote in Rochester's special election for mayor in 2010.
- Anthony Gronowicz ran for New York City mayor in 2013. Christina González is currently running for New York City Council in District 7.
- Bryan J. Jiminez received 374 votes (2.29%) in the Albany, NY General Election for mayor in 2017. Jiminez won in the primary election in September, defeating Dan Plaat.

== Election results ==
=== Presidential ===
| Year | Nominee | Votes |
|---|---|---|
| 1996 | Ralph Nader | 75,956 (1.20%) |
| 2000 | Ralph Nader | 244,398 (3.58%) |
| 2004 | David Cobb (write-in) | 138 (<0.1%) |
| 2008 | Cynthia McKinney | 12,801 (0.17%) |
| 2012 | Jill Stein | 39,982 (0.56%) |
| 2016 | Jill Stein | 107,934 (1.40%) |
| 2020 | Howie Hawkins | 32,832 (0.38%) |
| 2024 | Jill Stein (write-in) | 46,698 (0.57%) |

=== Gubernatorial ===
| Year | Nominee | Votes | +/- |
|---|---|---|---|
| 1998 | Al Lewis | 52,533 (1.11%) | N/A |
| 2002 | Stanley Aronowitz | 41,797 (0.91%) | -0.20% |
| 2006 | Malachy McCourt | 42,166 (0.89%) | -0.02% |
| 2010 | Howie Hawkins | 59,906 (1.30%) | +0.41% |
| 2014 | Howie Hawkins | 184,419 (4.86%) | +3.56% |
| 2018 | Howie Hawkins | 103,946 (1.70%) | -3.14% |

=== Senate ===
| Year | Nominee | Votes |
|---|---|---|
| 1998 | Joel Kovel | 14,735 (0.32%) |
| 2000 | Mark Dunau | 40,991 (0.60%) |
| 2004 | David McReynolds | 36,942 (0.30%) |
| 2006 | Howie Hawkins | 55,469 (1.2%) |
| 2010 | Colia Clark | 39,185 (1.0%) |
| 2010 (Special) | Cecile A. Lawrence | 35,487 (0.79%) |
| 2012 | Colia Clark | 36,547 (0.60%) |
| 2016 | Robin Laverne Wilson | 113,413 (1.53%) |

=== Mayor of New York City ===
| Year | Nominee | Votes |
|---|---|---|
| 2001 | Julia Willebrand | 7,155 |
| 2005 | Anthony Gronowicz | 8,297 (0.6%) |
| 2009 | Billy Talen | 8,902 (0.77%) |
| 2013 | Anthony Gronowicz | 4,983 (0.46%) |
| 2017 | Akeem Browder | 16,536 (1.44%) |

=== Attorney General ===
| Year | Nominee | Votes |
|---|---|---|
| 1998 | Johann L. Moore | 18,984 (0.44%) |
| 2002 | Mary Jo Long | 50,755 (1.23%) |
| 2006 | Rachel Treichler | 61,849 (1.44%) |
| 2014 | Ramon Jimenez | 76,697 (2.06%) |
| 2018 | Michael Sussman | 72,512 (1.21%) |

=== Comptroller ===
| Year | Nominee | Votes |
|---|---|---|
| 2018 | Mark Dunlea | 70,041 (1.16%) |

== Platform ==
The platform of the party is based upon the Four Pillars of the Green Party that originated with European Green Parties: Peace, Ecology, Social Justice, and Democracy. The Pillars are included in and expanded on in the Ten Key Values of the Green Party.

The official Green Party platform in New York is set by The Green Party of New York State Committee.

== Issues ==
The Green Party of New York supports the ban on hydraulic fracturing, which was brought up in the gubernatorial debate by Howie Hawkins and later approved by the state health department. Hawkins also pushed for a ban on genetically modified foods.

== Officeholders ==
While the party does not have any officeholders at the county, state or federal level, it has historically found some success at the local level. As of September 12, 2013, there were 3 elected Green mayors in New York State: David Doonan of Greenwich, James M. Sullivan of Victory, Saratoga County, New York and Jason West of New Paltz. All three have since left office.

=== List of officeholders ===
- Rome Celli – Brighton School Board, Brighton
- David Doonan – Mayor, Greenwich (Washington County)
- Jennifer Dotson – Common Council, First Ward, City of Ithaca (Tompkins County)
- Margaret Human – Town Planning Board, New Paltz
- Brian Kehoe – Village Trustee, Catskill
- Mary Jo Long – Town Council, Afton (Chenango County)
- Edgar Rodriguez – Board of Education, New Paltz Central School District (Ulster County)
- James M. Sullivan – Mayor of Victory, Saratoga County, New York
- Jason West – Mayor of New Paltz
- Jonathan Wright – Town Planning Board, New Paltz
