= Chris Lee (New York politician) =

American politician (born 1964)

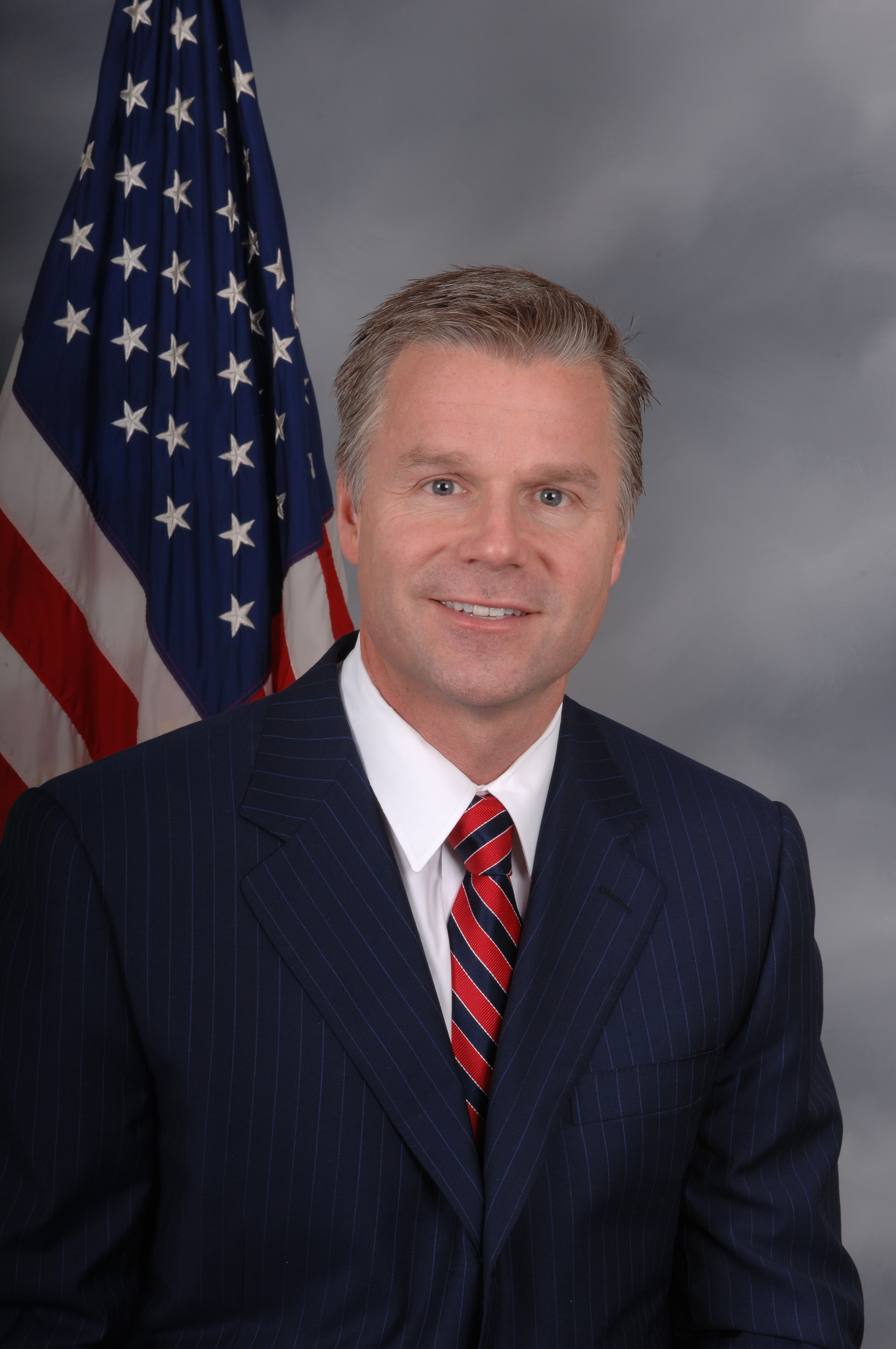

Member of the U.S. House of Representatives from New York's 26th district
- In office January 3, 2009 – February 9, 2011
- Preceded by: Thomas M. Reynolds
- Succeeded by: Kathy Hochul

Personal details
- Born: Christopher John Lee; April 1, 1964 (age 62) Kenmore, New York, U.S.
- Party: Republican
- Spouse: Michele Lee
- Children: 1
- Education: University of Rochester (BA); Chapman University (MBA)

Christopher John Lee (born April 1, 1964) is a former American politician and former Republican member of the United States House of Representatives for New York's 26th congressional district. He served from January 2009 until his resignation on February 9, 2011, following revelations that he had sent a shirtless photo of himself to a woman on Craigslist. Subsequent reporting revealed that Lee had also used Craigslist to solicit transsexual and cross-dressing sexual encounters.

== Early life and education ==
Lee was raised in Tonawanda, New York in a politically-active family. His sister ran regional affairs in western New York for former Governor George Pataki, and his father was the finance chairman on several campaigns for former U.S. Rep. Jack Quinn.

Lee earned a Bachelor of Arts degree in economics and finance from the University of Rochester and a Master of Business Administration from Chapman University in California. At Rochester, he was a member of the Psi Upsilon fraternity.

== Career ==
During his campaign for Congress, it emerged that Lee was fired from a sales job in Buffalo at Ingram Micro (now in Amherst) when he was 25 years old. He had obtained his supervisor's password and accessed customer accounts to change their credit limits with the company; as a result, Lee and another employee were fired.

Lee moved to California, where he worked for Microtek as director of sales before returning to New York in 1995 to work for Enidine, Inc., a company founded by his father and based in Orchard Park, New York. He worked at Enidine in various roles including Pacific Rim sales manager, director of international sales and marketing, and then general manager. Under Lee's direction, the business was transformed "from a small machine shop in western New York to a global enterprise," according to The New York Times.

In 2003, Lee became automation group president of International Motion Control (IMC) of Erie County, another company founded by his father. He oversaw the group's acquisition of the solenoid valve firm Evolutionary Concepts Inc., and worked at IMC until it was sold to the ITT Corporation for nearly $400 million in 2007.

Lee's father established the Patrick P. Lee Foundation, where Chris Lee served as director. The foundation promotes cancer and mental illness awareness, education, prevention, and research in Western New York.

== Political campaigns ==
Lee announced his candidacy for the Republican nomination for the United States House of Representatives in New York's 26th congressional district in April 2008. He was endorsed by the incumbent Rep. Thomas M. Reynolds, who was retiring; ultimately, Lee was supported by all seven of the district's Republican county chairmen, who met in May 2008 to announce that he would obtain the party's official endorsement. His candidacy garnered the support of state GOP Chairman Stephen Minarik in an election year in which the Republican party was looking for self-financed candidates. Lee won reelection in 2010 with 76 percent of the vote in a district that consistently votes Republican, according to The Weekly Standard.

== U.S. House of Representatives ==
- Committee assignments: Committee on Financial Services; Subcommittee on Financial Institutions and Consumer Credit; Subcommittee on Housing and Community Opportunity; Subcommittee on Oversight and Investigations

=== First term ===
In Congress, Lee was a conservative who voted with the Republican party 93% of the time during his first term. He voted "no" on the repeal of don't ask, don't tell, and "no" on the Lilly Ledbetter Fair Pay Act and the health care reform bills. He voted with the Democrats to expand the State Children's Health Insurance Program, provide compensation to the 9/11 responders, overhaul the nation's food safety system, and reauthorize the America Competes Act. In 2009, Lee supported the proposed Student Internet Safety Act, which was aimed at protecting children from internet predators.

Although Lee was a fiscally conservative budget hawk, he obtained $29.7 million in federal funds (known as earmarks) for his district—more than any of the Democratic members of Congress in neighboring districts. Lee explained that earmarks can be helpful in promoting job growth and said it is better to have earmarks than to have spending decisions made by unelected bureaucrats. He obtained earmarks for a small arms practice range for an Air Reserve station, high-speed rail, and local defense contractors. Lee was a member of the House Republican Economic Group, as well as the House Ways and Means Committee. This group sought to reduce individual tax rates, allow small businesses to reduce their tax liabilities, and provide assistance for the unemployed. As stated in his 2008 campaign, he believed that "taxes were too high, too burdensome and too complex".

He was criticized for liberal use of the franking privilege to send constituents glossy newsletters, some of which were described as promotional whereas others only gave constituents information on new legislation and proposals. In August 2010, Lee proposed a plan to bring manufacturing jobs back to the United States. The plan involved lowering the corporate tax rate, student loan forgiveness for students who enter fields related to manufacturing, and trade reform to open up new markets.

In December 2010, he met with representatives of online travel agencies to pressure them into complying with a law that requires websites to show when regional airlines are operating any part of a flight.

=== Second term and resignation ===
In the wake of the January 2011 shooting of U.S. Representative Giffords and others in Tucson, Arizona, Lee said "I think what we need to look at is ensuring there are sufficient background checks to make sure that those who are unstable don't have access to weapons of that nature." He also spent the beginning of his first term working with the House Ways and Means Committee.

On February 9, 2011, Lee was found to have been soliciting sexual encounters on Craigslist. He used a Gmail account to send a woman a shirtless photo taken with his BlackBerry phone. The woman searched his name, discovered he was a married congressman, and turned over her email correspondence to news blog Gawker, which published an exposé on February 9, 2011. Lee resigned from office the same day. He issued a statement of apology, saying, "I regret the harm that my actions have caused my family, my staff and my constituents.... I have made profound mistakes and I promise to work as hard as I can to seek their forgiveness." Lee did not return to Western New York after his resignation. Weeks later, reporting from Forbes revealed that Lee had also used Craigslist to solicit sexual encounters with transsexual and cross-dressing individuals.

Democratic Erie County clerk Kathy Hochul filled his seat after winning the special election on May 24 set by Governor Andrew Cuomo.

== Later career ==
After his resignation, Lee dedicated more of his time to philanthropic work. He is currently on the board of the Patrick P. Lee Foundation and serves as the Treasurer of the Osprey Cove Master Association.

== Personal life ==
Lee and his wife, Michele, have one child.

== Electoral history ==
2008 election
Party	Candidate	Votes	%	±%
Republican	Chris J. Lee	148,607	55.0	+3.0
Democratic	Alice Kryzan	109,615	40.5	−7.5
Working Families Party	Jon Powers	12,104	4.5	+4.5
Majority		38,992	14.5	+10.5
Total votes		270,326	100	+28.6

2010 election
Party	Candidate	Votes	%	±%
Republican	Chris J. Lee (incumbent)	151,449	73.6	+18.6
Democratic	Philip A. Fedele	54,307	26.4	−14.1
Majority		97,142	47.2	+32.7
Total votes		205,756	100	−23.9

== See also ==
- List of federal political scandals in the United States
- List of federal political sex scandals in the United States

U.S. House of Representatives
Preceded by Thomas M. Reynolds	Member of the U.S. House of Representatives from New York's 26th congressional district 2009–2011	Succeeded by Kathy Hochul
U.S. order of precedence (ceremonial)
Preceded by Felix Grucci as Former U.S. Representative	Order of precedence of the United States as Former U.S. Representative	Succeeded by Michael McMahon as Former U.S. Representative
