= Newfane =

Newfane may refer to several places in the United States:

- Newfane (town), New York
  - Newfane (CDP), New York, a census-designated place in the town
- Newfane, Vermont, a town
  - Newfane (village), Vermont, in the town
- New Fane, Wisconsin
