= Olcott Light =

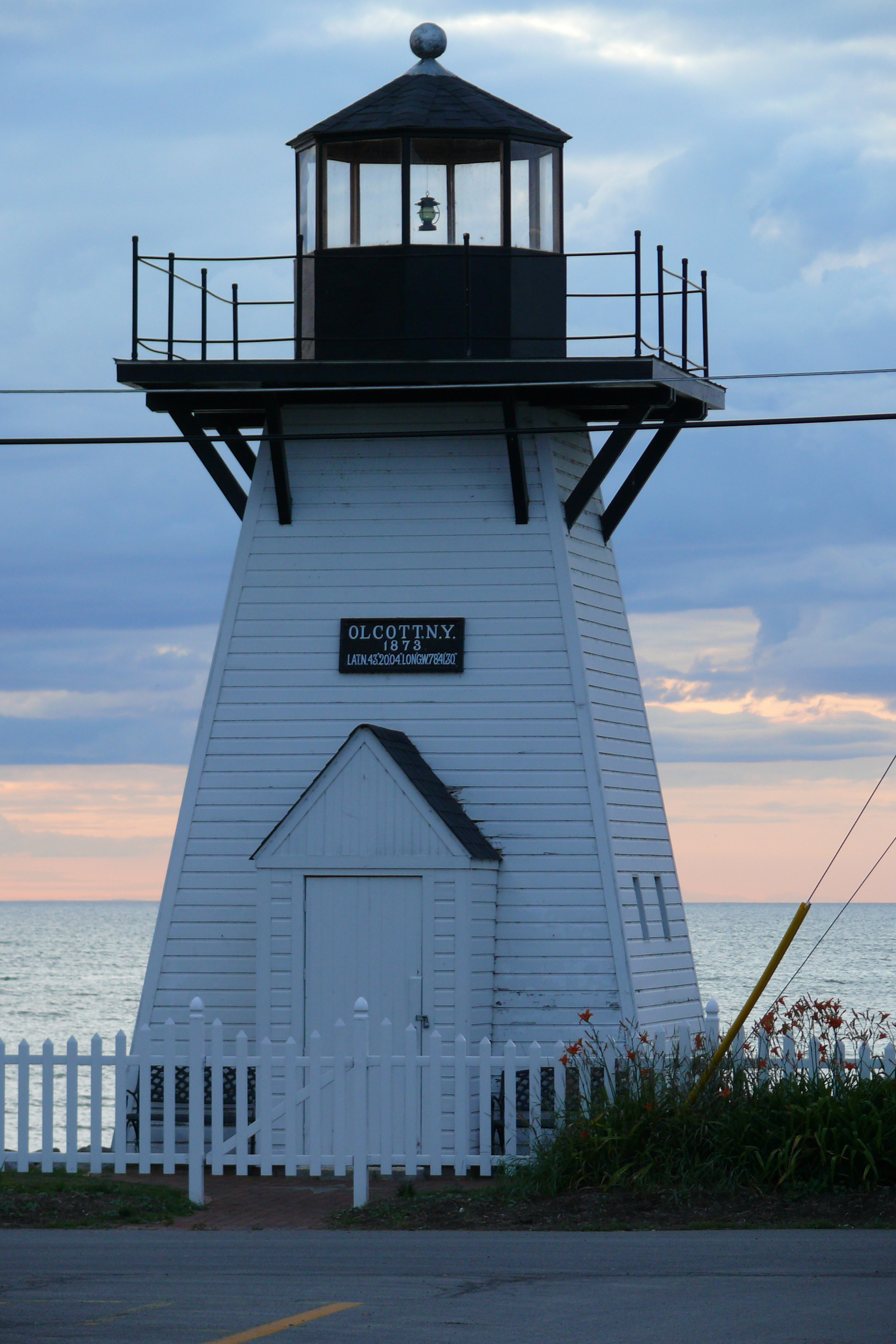
- Location: Olcott, New York, Lake Ontario
- Coordinates: 43°20′20″N 78°42′54″W

Tower
- Constructed: 1873
- Height: 27 feet (8.2 m)
- Shape: Square, pyramidal
- Markings: White with Black Lantern

Light
- Deactivated: 1932

Olcott Light was built on a pier in Olcott, New York at Eighteen Mile Creek, named for being eighteen miles from the Niagara River at Lake Ontario. The light was no longer needed in the 1930s, and was moved to a local yacht club, where it resided until the early 1960s when it was destroyed. In the summer of 2003, a replica was built from old photographs.
