= International Railway (New York–Ontario) =

Transit company in Buffalo, New York (1902–50)

International Railway Co.

Overview
- Headquarters: Buffalo, New York
- Reporting mark: IRC
- Locale: Buffalo and Niagara Frontier
- Dates of operation: 1902–1950
- Successor: Niagara Frontier Transit System

Technical
- Track gauge: 4 ft 8 1/2 in (1,435 mm)
- Electrification: 600v DC

The International Railway Company (IRC) was a transportation company formed in a 1902 merger between several Buffalo-area interurban and street railways. The city railways that merged were the West Side Street Railway, the Crosstown Street Railway and the Buffalo Traction Company. The suburban railroads that merged included the Buffalo & Niagara Electric Street Railway, and its subsidiary the Buffalo, Lockport & Olcott Beach Railway; the Buffalo, Depew & Lancaster Railway; and the Niagara Falls Park & River Railway. Later the IRC acquired the Niagara Gorge Railroad (NGRR) as a subsidiary, which was sold in 1924 to the Niagara Falls Power Company. The NGRR also leased the Lewiston & Youngstown Frontier Railroad.

The IRC maintained streetcar networks throughout Western New York: in Buffalo, Niagara Falls and Lockport, and a single line in Niagara Falls, Ontario.

Partially owing to the decline of the streetcar system, the IRC declared bankruptcy in 1947 and transferred its assets to the newly formed Niagara Frontier Transit System (later the Niagara Frontier Transportation Authority), shutting down the streetcar network in 1950. The city of Buffalo would not see rapid transit rail again until 1984 when the Buffalo Metro Rail began operation under the NFTA.

== Network ==
Besides the city streetcars, the IRC network extended throughout Erie and Niagara counties. Most lines radiated out from Buffalo.

- The former Buffalo and Niagara Falls Electric Railway (B&NF) line ran from Buffalo, through the Tonawandas and Wheatfield to Niagara Falls, Ontario. This line interchanged with the Niagara, St. Catharines and Toronto Railway in Canada, the Niagara Gorge Railroad in Niagara Falls, NY, and the Buffalo & Lake Erie Traction in Buffalo. The railway was organized and incorporated by Niagara Falls, New York, investors, including Frank A. Dudley This line was later abandoned between Tonawanda and LaSalle in Niagara Falls, following the opening of Buffalo & Niagara Falls High Speed Line in 1918. The B&NF high speed line was abandoned in 1937. The 1895 powerhouse at North Tonawanda, New York, forms part of the Herschell–Spillman Motor Company Complex.
- The Buffalo, Lockport and Olcott Beach Railway (BL&OB) left the B&NF in North Tonawanda, NY, on tracks leased from the Erie Railroad. This line went up to Lockport, where the Lockport streetcars were IRC. Also the IRC met the Buffalo, Lockport & Rochester here. The Buffalo, Lockport and Rochester (BL&R) ran to Rochester. From Lockport, the line continued through the town of Newfane to Olcott, where the IRC maintained an amusement park. IRC trolleys met steamers from Rochester, Youngstown, Hamilton, Ontario and Toronto in Olcott at the Olcott Beach docks. In 1937 the IRC abandoned the line north of Lockport, and ended passenger service south of Lockport. IRC returned operations of the line to the Erie Railroad in 1951. A portion of the BL&OB was reopened in 1983 as part of the Somerset Railroad.
- The Buffalo, Bellvue and Lancaster (BB&L) interurban line ran from Buffalo to Lancaster. From Lancaster a line branched off to Depew, creating a loop line. This route was abandoned in 1937.
- The Buffalo, Gardenville and Ebenezer (BG&E) was part of Erie County Traction. It ran from Buffalo to Ebenezer, and was abandoned in 1937.
- The Buffalo, Hamburg and Aurora Railway (BH&A) ran from Buffalo, NY, to Orchard Park. The original intention was to reach East Aurora, NY. East Aurora was never reached. also part of Erie County Traction.
- The Buffalo and Depew ran from the end of the Genesee car line in Pine Hill to Depew. It was reorganized in the early 1920s as the Depew and Lancaster and operated until 1925.
- The Niagara Falls Park & River Railway (NFP&R) opened in 1893. It ran from Chippawa, Ontario, to Lewiston, New York. A connection was made across the international border at Niagara Falls with the B&NF. It became part of the IRC in the 1902 merger. This line is best known for a visit by the Prince of Wales (later Edward VIII) in 1927. The IRC and the Niagara Gorge Railroad (NGRR) connected in both Lewiston and Niagara Falls, New York. The Park & River line was abandoned in 1932, following the expiration of the lease of the right-of-way through Queen Victoria Park.

== Buses and modern rail lines ==
Workers arriving on IRC buses, 1943

In 1937 the IRC discontinued all interurban rail service, and replaced much of it with buses. On July 1, 1950, the remaining streetcar lines in both Buffalo and Niagara Falls, NY, ended, also replaced by buses. Within the same year, the Niagara Frontier Transit (NFT) took over all remaining IRC operations. In 1974, NFT and Grand Island Rapid Transit were merged into a public Corporation, named the Niagara Frontier Transportation Authority (NFTA).

The NFTA opened the subsidiary light rail rapid transit line known as Metro Rail along Main Street in Buffalo, from the Lackawanna Terminal to the University of Buffalo's South Campus. Much of this same route followed the previous 8-Main streetcar line only 35 years earlier.

== Routes of city of Buffalo streetcars ==
Buffalo was the city where a majority of the streetcar service by the IRC was offered. They IRC also offered service in a number of other localities in Western New York and Southern Ontario.

After the first decade of the 1900s, the International Railway Company began assigning numbers to their services, in addition to the naming of the route according to the primary street(s) the car travelled on. Many of the route numbers assigned the most historical routes continue to this day. There appears to be no logical numbering scheme for the routes.

Routes with shortened or abbreviated names in parentheses are the original assignment to the route that it served. These services were slowly changed to the numerical format used by the IRC after being taken over from other companies.

=== Main Street ===
Although the terminal point for the majority of west side streetcars, the streetcars that used Main Street clearly made the street live up to its name.

In addition to Shelton Square being the origination point for the Grant, Niagara, and Elmwood streetcar lines, there were also a number of routes that passed through Shelton Square to continue either south towards the docks and harbor, or north toward the northeast sections of the city. The Main streetcar shared trackage with the Parkside-Zoo (or Kenmore) streetcar, the Kensington street car, the West Utica and East Utica streetcars. During the busy weekday, the four- to five-minute headways between cars on each line made it common to see streetcar after streetcar lining Main Street after departing Utica Street.

== Route of Niagara Falls, New York, streetcars ==
Car Line	Route Numbers	Began Service	Ended Service	Car Type	Terminals	Streets Travelled
19th Street						
Main Street						
Pine Avenue						
Buffalo Ave						
Riverview						
11th Street						
Sugar Street (Hyde Park)						

== Equipment / Rolling Stock ==
The International Railway Company utilized many of the vehicles from the companies it had absorbed at the early 1900s, and by 1910 found itself looking for replacement vehicles.

Two major car types became the backbone of the IRC's equipment force.

=== Nearside car (6000 to 6363) ===
The Nearside type streetcar was purchased from the J.G. Brill Company between the years of 1911–1913. The cars were manufactured, using the input of Mitten Management, the company that provided the management structure for the International Railway Company.

A notable feature this type of car was known for was the P.A.Y.E. (pay as you enter) entrance, starting the policy shift of Buffalo area streetcars to operate with a one-person crew. Using this type of boarding procedure the operator of the car also handled the responsibilities of the conductor, collecting fares in addition to his normal day-to-day operating of the streetcar.

=== Peter Witt car (100 to 229) ===
The Peter Witt streetcars, long known to be in many major cities with streetcars, were purchased between 1917 and 1919 to supplement the service being primarily offered with the earlier purchased Nearside car. These cars were built by Kuhlman Car Co. of Cleveland, Ohio. The Peter Witts were delivered on their own wheels and under their own power. This was done over a series of interurban railways' trackage that connected Cleveland with Buffalo.

=== Funeral cars ===
Two specific cars were available to those needing funeral cars. The Elmlawn and Greenwood were their names. Both burned in 1916, and were replaced with new cars of the same names - these were used until 1922, when they were converted to regular passenger use.

=== Special service cars ===
Limousine service had not quite become readily available when dignitaries came to visit the area, and the International Railway Company had cars specifically for that purpose.

The Ondiara car of the International Railway Company, and the Rapids car of the Niagara Gorge Railway were two cars that were used when the Prince of Wales visited the area on September 10, 1927, during the dedication of the Peace Bridge (between Buffalo and Fort Erie).

== Color scheme ==
In 1902, when the International Railway Company began absorbing many of the responsibilities of the Buffalo streetcar system, they dealt with a number of varied color schemes that existed with the past companies.

Previously, one could look at many of the cars and immediately know which company was operating that service.

- The Buffalo Street Railway cars utilized a bright yellow color.
- The Broadway line at one time operated violet colored cars from Downtown Buffalo to Emslie.
- The Jersey line boasted a green colored streetcar.

Toward the end, many of the streetcars left in service were painted an orange color as the primary color, with a darker green accenting the car. This color scheme existed until the end of streetcar service in 1950, although the buses operated by the IRC at the end were painted a bright red color with silver and black accents.

== Visible remains of the IRC system ==
Broadway Barns	Located on Broadway between Bailey Avenue and Greene Street on Buffalo's east side, this building continues to stand and is used as for an architecture/construction firm's offices and garage. The Broadway Barns housed the streetcars that serviced most of the city's east side car lines, notably the 4-Broadway car, which trundled by since its opening.
Forest Avenue Barns	Located on Forest Avenue and Tremont Avenue on the west side. This building was also utilized as a streetcar repair depot. However, by 1939 the old west side lines had pretty much ceased to exist. The building is currently used by the Buffalo History Museum as a storage facility with a special exhibit about the Pan-American Exposition.
Walden Avenue Barns	Located on Walden Avenue near Lathrop Street near the New York Central Belt Line. Building still standing, now used as an automotive repair shop.
1231 Seneca Street at Imson Street	Former IRC building with complete IRC markings. Abandoned, possibly old offices, power station or repair shops.
Kenmore Extension at Seabrook	On the site of the past Seabrook Loop of the 3-Grant bus line sits a building that is now part of the Buffalo Public Schools. The previous use was as a power transformer for the IRC Streetcars electrical supply.
Virgil Avenue & St. Lawrence Avenue	There is an earthen embankment at the end of the dead-end street where the lower sections of the concrete supports for the old DL&W Belt Line are still visible.
Virgil Avenue (North Buffalo)	The streetcar tracks are still visible even after being buried under asphalt all these years. On rainy days the old tracks are most visible.
Fillmore Avenue (Seneca Street to Best Street)	The streetcar tracks on this old route are visible along this entire stretch of roadway.
New Flyer Industries bus 9318	This NFTA Metro bus was painted as an International Railway Company streetcar, some 50 years after the end of the International Railway Company. The bus is primarily a dark green color, with a cream and rust accents and imitation gold leaf for the crest, logo and "INTERNATIONAL" lettering.
Buffalo-Niagara Falls High Speed Line	Much of the original right-of-way and graded roadbed, including a second roadbed graded as a provision for never-built third and fourth tracks, exist in areas that were not overlaid by limited-access highways (Twin Cities Arterial/Colvin Avenue extension, LaSalle Expressway). The concrete bases of catenary support structures are still in place along much of the former right-of-way.
Buffalo-Depew Boulevard	This short street in the Town of Cheektowaga occupies a short section of the former Buffalo, Depew and Lancaster interurban right-of-way. Despite the grandiose name, Buffalo-Depew Boulevard is only about 0.3 miles (0.5 kilometers) long.
Parkside Avenue	Much of the right-of-way for the 9-Parkside line was incorporated into Delaware Park. The roadbed grade is evident along much of Parkside Avenue. Ruins of a large shelter south of Amherst Street, on the west side of the street, still remain, with the shelter being gradually dismantled since bus service on Parkside Avenue was withdrawn.
18 Mile Creek Bridge Lockport, New York
