= Great Gorge Route =

Trolley line through the Niagara Gorge, New York, United States

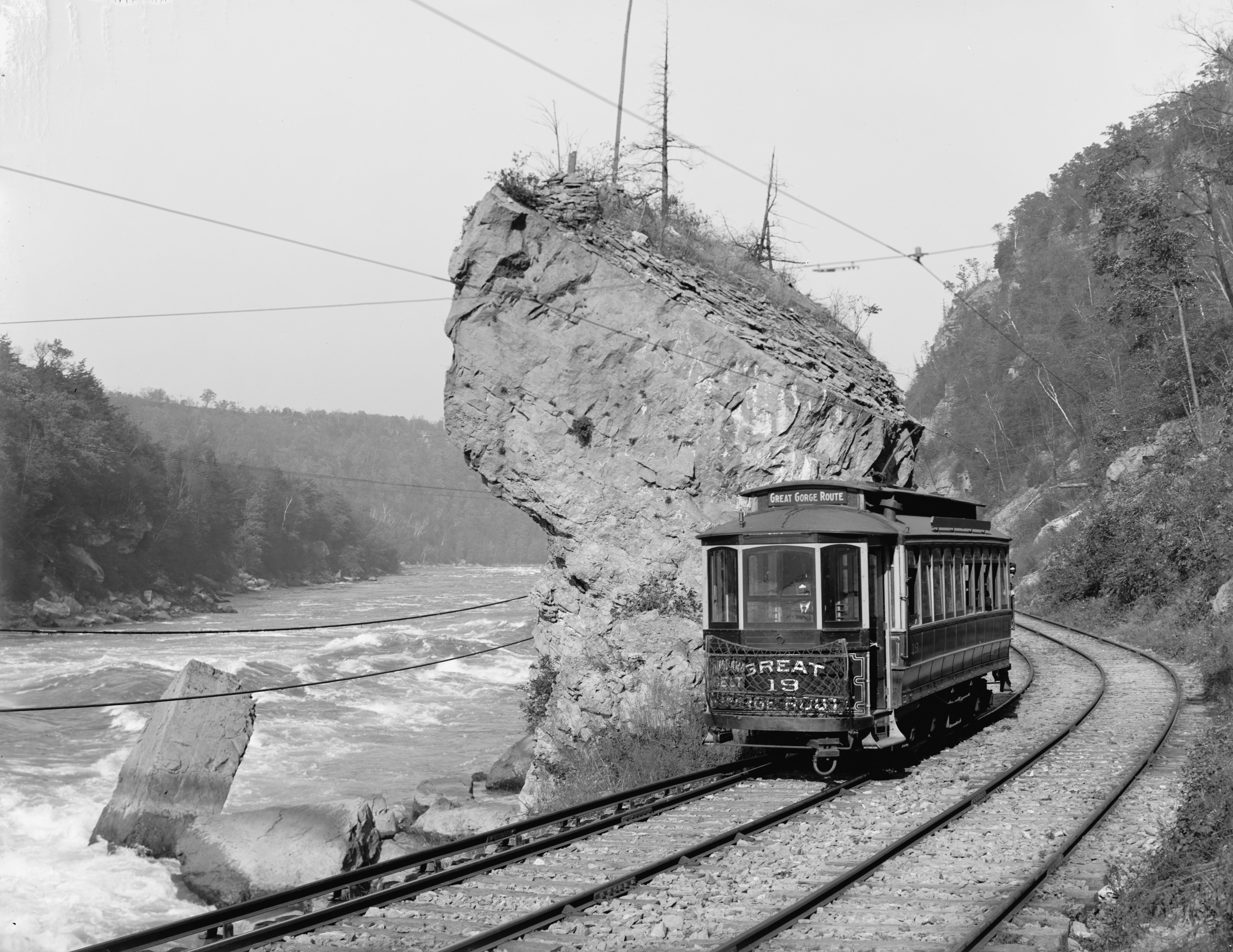
Car of the Niagara Gorge Railroad

The Great Gorge Route or Niagara Belt Line was an interurban trolley belt line encompassing the Niagara Gorge, operated by the International Railway and Niagara Gorge Railroad. Many dignitaries rode this line, and they used to use a flat car with a searchlight to illuminate the Niagara Whirlpool at night (during the tourist season).

== Beginning ==
In 1895, the International Railway Company (IRC) established the Great Gorge Route scenic attraction. This electric trolley line ran from Niagara Falls (Prospect Park) to Lewiston, NY, along the banks of the Niagara River. The trolley line ceased in 1935, as did other interurban lines, victims of the Depression and the change in tourist transportation preferences (bus and automobile).

== The route ==
The Canadian route ran from Niagara Falls, Ontario, to Queenston, Ontario, with a bridge crossing at Queenston. This side was on the top of the Gorge.

The American side ran in the gorge from Youngstown, New York, to Niagara Falls, New York, where it gradually ascended to cross the Upper Steel Arch Bridge. On the way, it passed under the Whirlpool Rapids Bridge and the Michigan Central Railway Bridge.

== Rolling stock ==
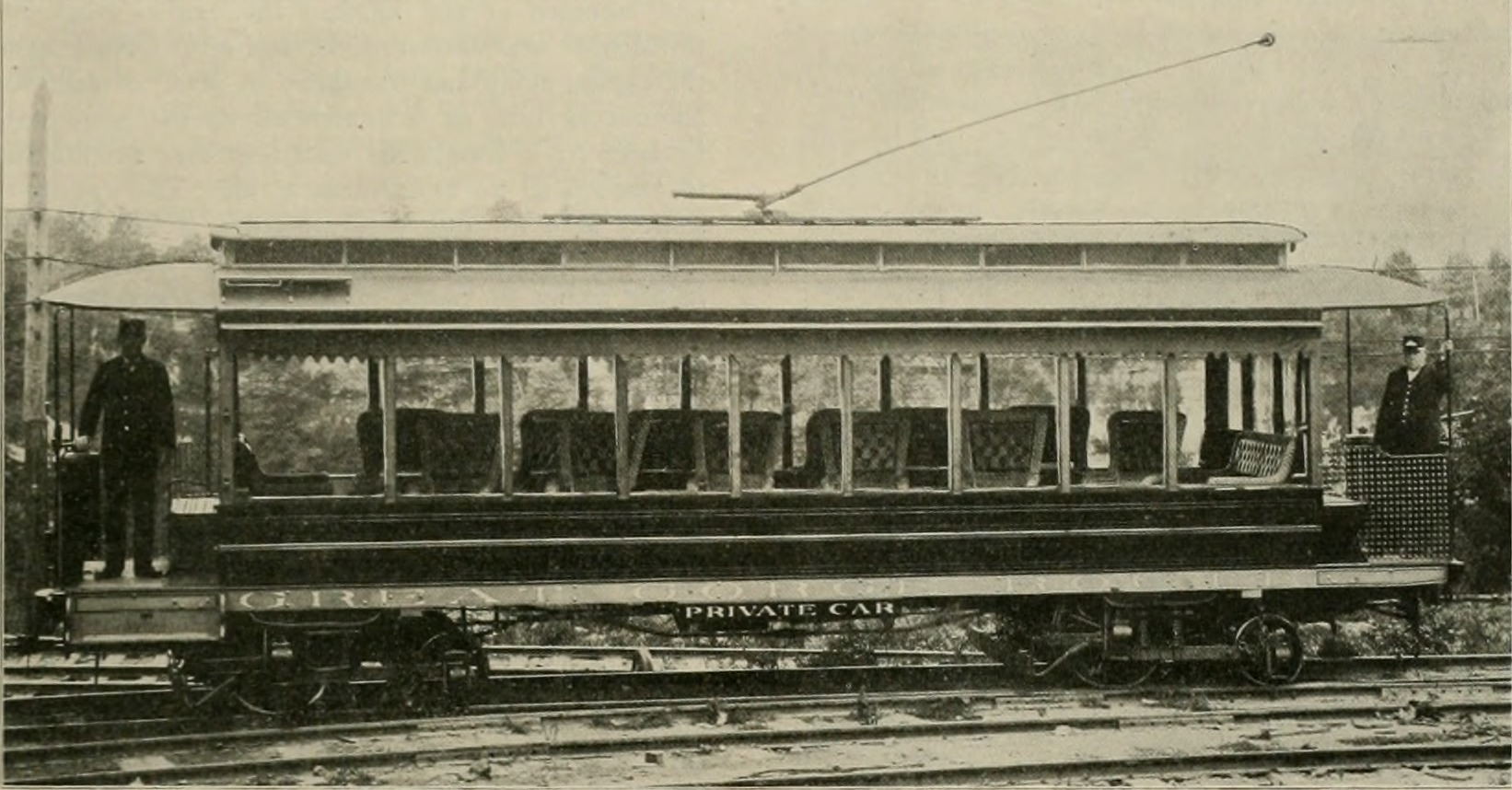
Private car with reversed maximum traction truck

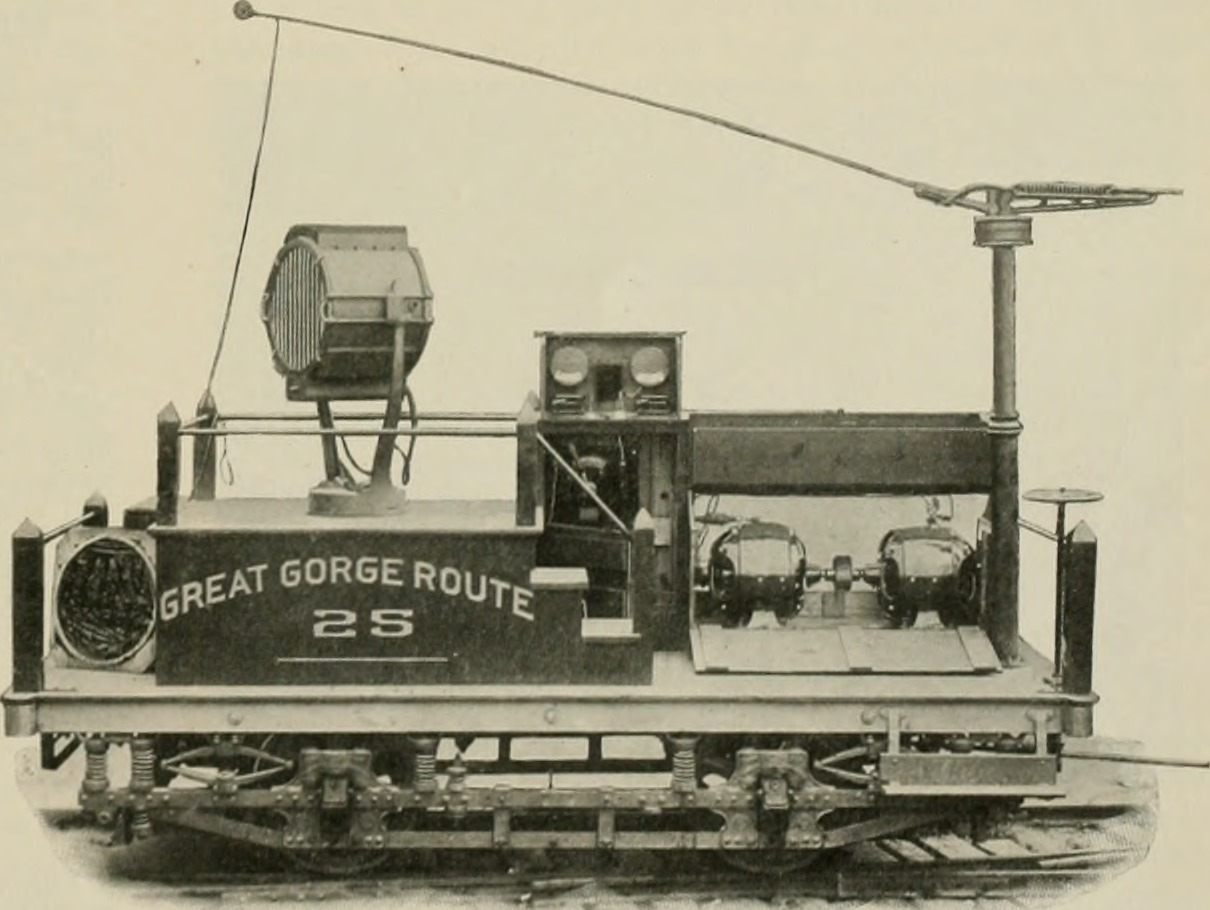
Searchlight car
