= Ridgewood, New York =

Ridgewood, New York may refer to:

- Ridgewood, Queens, in the borough of Queens in New York City
- Ridgewood, Niagara County, New York, a hamlet in Niagara County, New York
