= Appleton, New York =

- hamlet
- Location of Appleton in New York Appleton, New York (the United States)
- Coordinates: 43°19′39″N 78°38′53″W
- Country: United States
- State: New York
- County: Niagara
- Elevation: 338 ft (103 m)
- Time zone: UTC-5 (Eastern (EST))
  - Summer (DST): UTC-4 (EDT)
- ZIP code: 14008
- Area code: 716
- GNIS feature ID: 942521

Appleton is a hamlet in the town of Newfane in Niagara County, New York, United States.
