= Lewiston and Youngstown Frontier Electric Railway =

Coordinates: 43.1728°N 79.0412°W

Lewiston & Youngstown Frontier Electric Railway
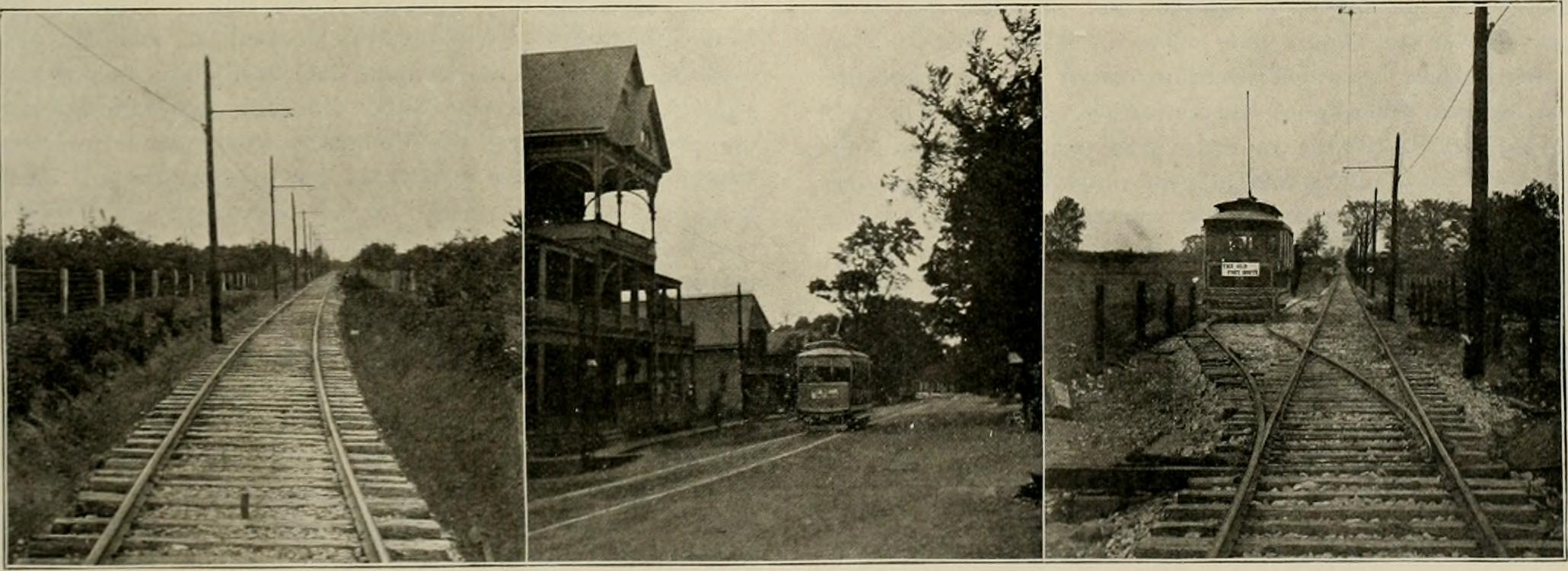
- Lewiston & Youngstown Frontier Electric Railway

Overview
- Locale: Niagara County, New York
- Dates of operation: 1895–

Technical
- Track gauge: 1,435 mm (4 ft 8 1/2 in) standard gauge
- Electrification: 750 V
- Length: 7 1/4 miles (11.7 km)

The Lewiston & Youngstown Frontier Electric Railway connected the villages of Lewiston and Youngstown in Niagara County, New York.

== Company ==
The company was set-up by a number of local capitalists in the summer of 1895. After a number of surveys the railroad was finally located through private property between these villages, about one-quarter of a mile easterly from the River Road, thus avoiding the destruction of property along the banks of the lower Niagara River, or occupying the highway.

== Route ==
The contract for the construction of the roadbed, ballasting, overhead work and fencing was let April 12, 1896, to Craige & Tench, Buffalo, New York, for the sum of $63,500. The railroad started from the New York Central depot at Lewiston and ran up Center street to 5th street. Then it ran northerly through 5th street to the village limits, then through private lands to 3rd street, Youngstown, then through Church street to Main street and to the United States Military Reservation, at the mouth of the Niagara River. There was also a branch in Lewiston from 5th street through Onondaga street to the New York Central freight station and a branch in Youngstown to the docks. The road was 7 1/4 miles (11.7 km) long in all.

The country through which this road ran is extremely level and is in the heart of the Niagara fruit district, being largely devoted to the culture of apples, peaches and grapes. The right of way is 30 feet (9.1 m) in width and fenced throughout its entire length between the villages. There were no structures whatever on the line, with the exception of a few wooden box culverts and one trestle 48 feet (15 m) long and about 9 feet (2.7 m) high.

== Track ==
The road was single track of 1,435 mm (4 ft 8 1/2 in) and had five turnouts in the course of the line with end switches at each end. In the two villages the track was laid with girder rails, 2 1/4 miles (3.6 km) of 67-lb/yard (32.5 kg/m) and 1/2 mile (0.80 km) of 87-lb/yard (43.5 kg/m) and in the country for 4 1/2 miles (7.2 km) with 56-lb/yard (27.7kg/m) T-rails. The Johnson Company furnished the rails and track fastenings and all the rails except the 87-lb/yard (43.5 kg/m) girders which were rolled by the Pennsylvania Steel Company. The ties were of cedar, 6 by 8 inches (15 cm × 20 cm) x 8 feet (2.4 m), spaced 2 feet (61 cm) between centers. The line was ballasted with broken stone which was 6 inches (15 cm) deep under the ties.

== Electrification ==
R. W. Oliver furnished the overhead work at a cost of $9,750. In the villages span work was used and in the country side pole bracket work. The trolley wire was No. 00 and there were nearly 24,000 feet (7.3 km) of No. 0000 stranded triple covered feed wire starting from Lewiston and reaching nearly to Youngstown. All poles and fence posts were painted olive green.

No power plant was constructed by this company, because power could be obtained from the plant of the Niagara Falls & Power Company, which was situated 7.17 miles (11.54 km) away from Lewiston. It was generated by one of the 1.000-h.p. generators situated in the new power house at the foot of the cliff at a voltage of 550 Volts. This was raised to 750 volts by being passed through a booster and was conveyed to Lewiston over a 500,000 circular mil stranded copper wire triple covered. This wire was strung on the poles of the Niagara Gorge Railroad and thus brought to Lewiston, where it was connected with the trolley and feed wire.

== Rolling stock ==
The equipment consisted of four, eight bench open motor cars and two closed combination baggage and passenger cars seating 16 people, made by the J. G. Brill Company, Philadelphia. The combination cars had a vestibule on the passenger end, and the baggage compartment, which was 8 feet (2.4 m) long, had sliding doors on each side and three drop sash in the front end allowing the motorman to occupy the baggage compartment when running that end forward, but there was no vestibule. All these cars are equipped with Brill eureka maximum traction trucks, with 33 and 20 inches (840 and 510 mm) diameter wheels. Each truck was equipped with one G.E. 1,000 motor, thus giving each car 2,000 pounds-force (8.9 kN) horizontal tractive pull. The total cost of roadway, equipment, transmission line, land damages, etc., amounted to very nearly $100,000.

== Operation ==
After a number of delays, owing to the non-arrival of material, etc., the road was informally opened the latter part of August, 1896. The company contemplated a freight as well as a passenger service, and was handling about 10 cars of freight per day in 1897, beside package freight. A steady passenger traffic was maintained between the points mentioned, which increased during the summer.

When the Niagara Gorge Railroad was taken out of use in 1935, the Lewiston & Youngstown Frontier Electric Railway remained in service as a diesel freight line.

== Personnel ==
The officers of the company were:

- L. D. Rumsey, president
- H. C. Howard, vice-president and treasurer
- F. R. March, attorney
- Karl Evans, general passenger and freight agent
- R. B. Goodman, superintendent, all of Buffalo, New York.

The engineering work was led by Paul Voorhes of Buffalo. He constructed other rails, among them Buffalo & Williamsville Electric Railway and the Buffalo, Gardenville & Ebenezer Railway.
