= Corwin, New York =

Hamlet in New York, United States

Coordinates: 43°15′09″N 78°41′36″W

Corwin
- Hamlet
- Interactive map of Corwin
- Country: United States
- State: State
- County: Niagara
- Town: Newfane
- Elevation: 348 ft (106 m)
- Time zone: UTC-5 (Eastern Standard Time)
  - Summer (DST): UTC-4 (Eastern Daylight Time)

Corwin is a hamlet in the town of Newfane in Niagara County, New York, United States.
