= Newfane (CDP), New York =

Newfane, New York
- Census-designated place
- Location in Niagara County and the state of New York.

- Location within New York
- Coordinates: 43°17′7″N 78°42′5″W
- Country: United States
- State: New York
- County: Niagara

Area
  - Total: 5.31 sq mi (13.74 km^{2})
  - Land: 5.31 sq mi (13.74 km^{2})
  - Water: 0 sq mi (0.00 km^{2})
- Elevation: 344 ft (105 m)

Population (2020)
  - Total: 3,662
  - Density: 690.5/sq mi (266.62/km^{2})
- Time zone: UTC-5 (Eastern (EST))
  - Summer (DST): UTC-4 (EDT)
- ZIP Codes: 14108 (Newfane); 14028 (Burt)
- Area code: 716
- FIPS code: 36-50221
- GNIS feature ID: 0958509

Newfane is a census-designated place (CDP) in the town of Newfane in Niagara County, New York, United States, along State Route 78. The population was 3,822 at the 2010 census. It is part of the Buffalo–Niagara Falls Metropolitan Statistical Area.

== Geography ==
Newfane is located at 43°17′7″N 78°42′4″W (43.285356, -78.701379).

According to the United States Census Bureau, the CDP has a total area of 4.7 square miles (12.1 km^{2}), all land.

== Demographics ==
Historical population
Census	Pop.	Note	%±
2020	3,662		—
U.S. Decennial Census

As of the census of 2000, there were 3,129 people, 1,130 households, and 820 families residing in the CDP. The population density was 670.3 inhabitants per square mile (258.8/km^{2}). There were 1,191 housing units at an average density of 255.1 per square mile (98.5/km^{2}). The racial makeup of the CDP was 97.73% White, 0.67% Black or African American, 0.45% Native American, 0.16% Asian, and 0.99% from two or more races. Hispanic or Latino of any race were 0.45% of the population.

There were 1,130 households, out of which 34.2% had children under the age of 18 living with them, 56.6% were married couples living together, 12.3% had a female householder with no husband present, and 27.4% were non-families. 22.8% of all households were made up of individuals, and 10.4% had someone living alone who was 65 years of age or older. The average household size was 2.62 and the average family size was 3.09.

In the CDP, the population was spread out, with 25.9% under the age of 18, 7.6% from 18 to 24, 27.6% from 25 to 44, 21.5% from 45 to 64, and 17.4% who were 65 years of age or older. The median age was 38 years. For every 100 females, there were 90.7 males. For every 100 females age 18 and over, there were 86.3 males.

The median income for a household in the CDP was $39,924, and the median income for a family was $48,869. Males had a median income of $37,599 versus $23,702 for females. The per capita income for the CDP was $17,709. About 8.0% of families and 9.3% of the population were below the poverty line, including 12.4% of those under age 18 and 4.8% of those age 65 or over.
