= Van Horn Mansion =

Historic house in New York, United States

- U.S. National Register of Historic Places
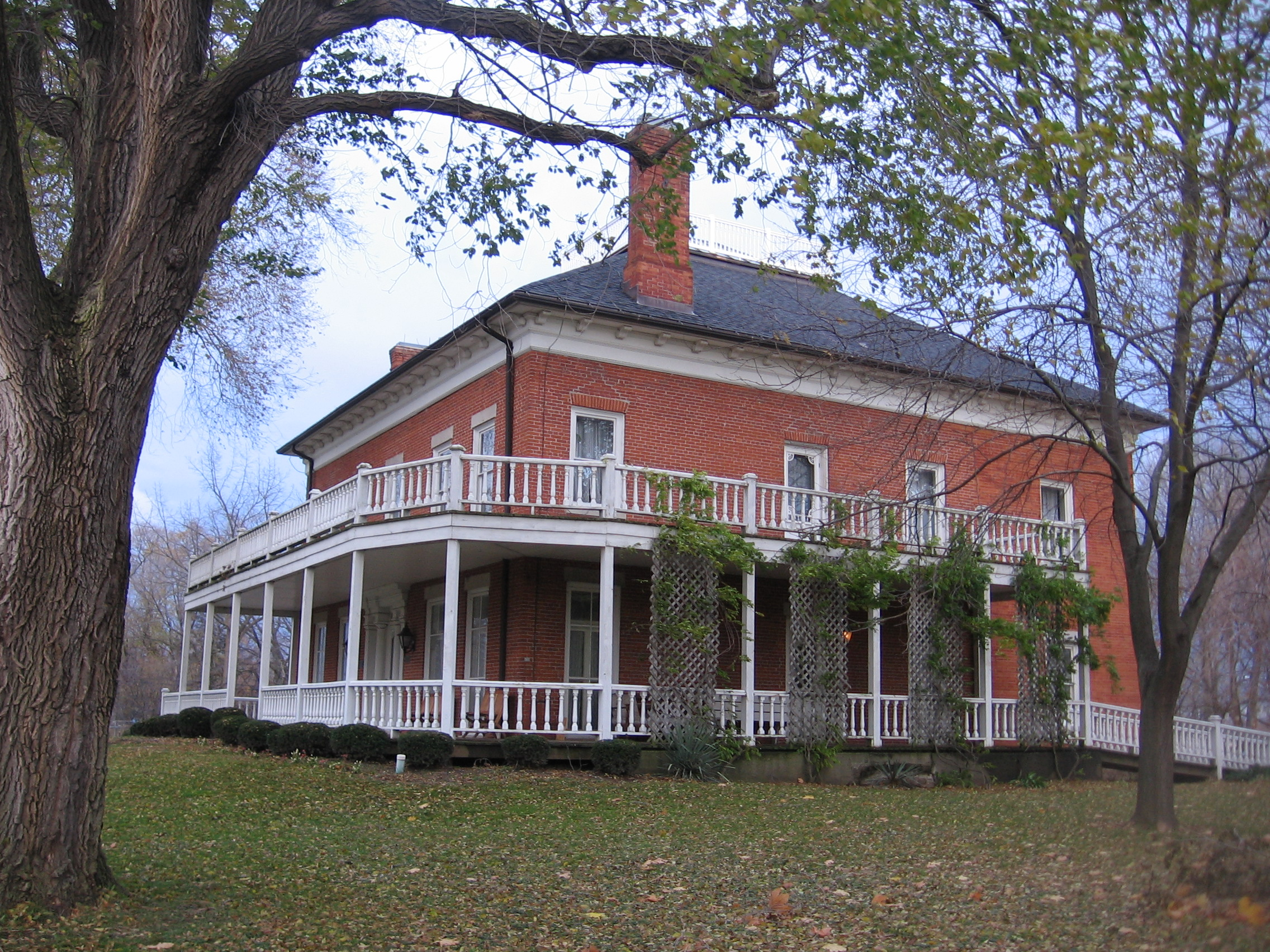
- The Van Horn Mansion located on Lockport Olcott Road

- Location within New York
- Nearest city: Newfane, New York
- Coordinates: 43°18′49″N 78°42′51″W
- Built: 1823
- Architectural style: Colonial Revival; Georgian
- NRHP reference No.: 91001149
- Added to NRHP: September 9, 1991

The Van Horn Mansion was built by Judge James Van Horn in 1823. It is the site of the Town of Newfane's first town meeting, April 6, 1824. The name for the Town of Newfane is believed to be chosen by the town Postmaster. The Mansion includes 16 rooms and five bathrooms. It is located on Lockport-Olcott Road in Niagara County, New York on Route 78 and is also considered to be haunted. It is one many National Register of Historic Places in Niagara County.

== Judge James Van Horn ==
Judge James Van Horn was born in the state of New Jersey. James Van Horn moved north as the famous Erie Canal was being built. Van Horn settled in Newfane in 1817 with 9 children. Van Horn built a gristmill and was the first builder of a wool mill in Niagara County, New York in 1842. Van Horn became one of four of Niagara County's first judge's in 1821. In 1823, he built the brick Georgian-style Van Horn Mansion which was the first brick home in Newfane. James Van Horn was the Town of Newfane Supervisor from 1829 to 1831.

== The Mansion after the Van Horns ==
The last surviving Van Horn descendant sold the mansion to W.H. Davis of New York City in 1910. In 1922, it was owned by Herbert Pease. Douglas Patterson of Nova Scotia, Canada, purchased the mansion in 1929 after a short ownership by the Cramer Brothers. During that time until 1938, Patterson opened a community skating rink to the residents of Newfane. In 1939, the structure suffered a fire. Mary Wagner received the mansion in 1949, and helped to renovate it for an upscale restaurant known as Green Acres. In 1959, the building was converted into apartments by John Strickland and eventually was left for vandals. The Noury Chemical Company acquired the structure and then donated it to the Newfane Historical Society in 1987. The Newfane Historical Society has maintained its splendor and value to the present day. It has held Victorian teas, tours, and underwent numerous volunteer renovation programs over the years.

== Haunting Occurrences ==
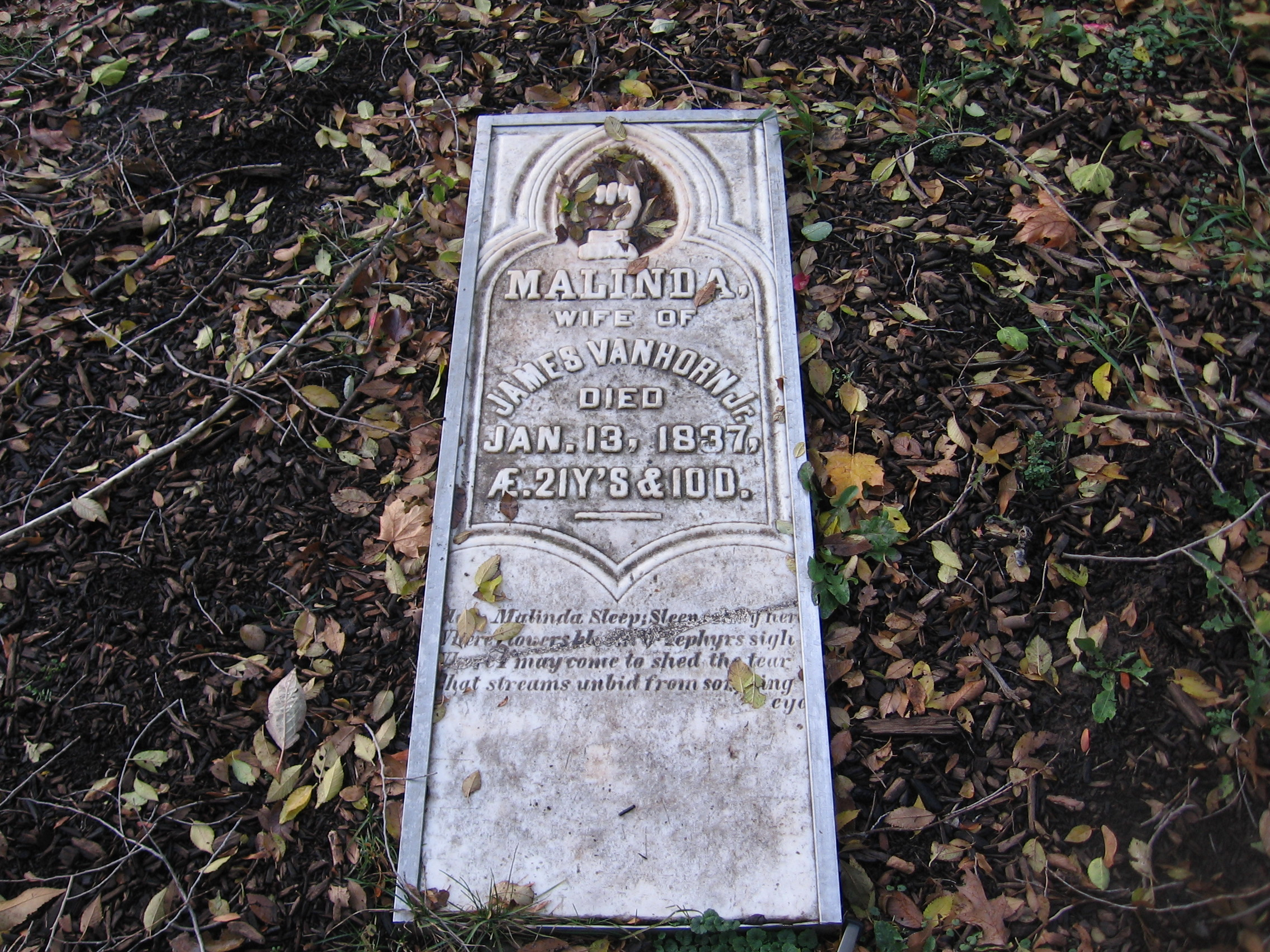
Malinda Van Horn's grave stone located on the grounds of the Van Horn.

In 1996, a student of Niagara County Community College created a haunted house in the mansion. Psychics have long called the building haunted. The Van Horn Mansion is one of several haunted locations in Niagara County and Western New York. During renovations roofers witnessed faces in windows of the vacant mansion and saw lights flicker for no reason. Carpenters saw spirits appear to them. The person who haunts the mansion is said to be Malinda with a few others. The grave of Malinda, wife of James Van Horn Jr, is located in the rose garden on the south side of the grounds. Cars have skidded to avoid hitting a girl running from the mansion who later vanishes. The girl is believed to be Malinda. People have held séances there, and have recounted other paranormal occurrences as well. The bones of Malinda have since been moved to a small area in the backyard of the mansion and no other paranormal encounters have been made.

Researcher Joe Nickell has written that there is no credible evidence the mansion is haunted. He wrote that the various incidents at the mansion have simple physical causes or are the result of misperception and suggestion. Nickell discovered that there were many contradictory and exaggerated stories about Malinda. He also attended some séances in 2003 and discovered the table-tipping phenomena was the result of the ideomotor effect.

== Interior/Exterior of the Van Horn ==
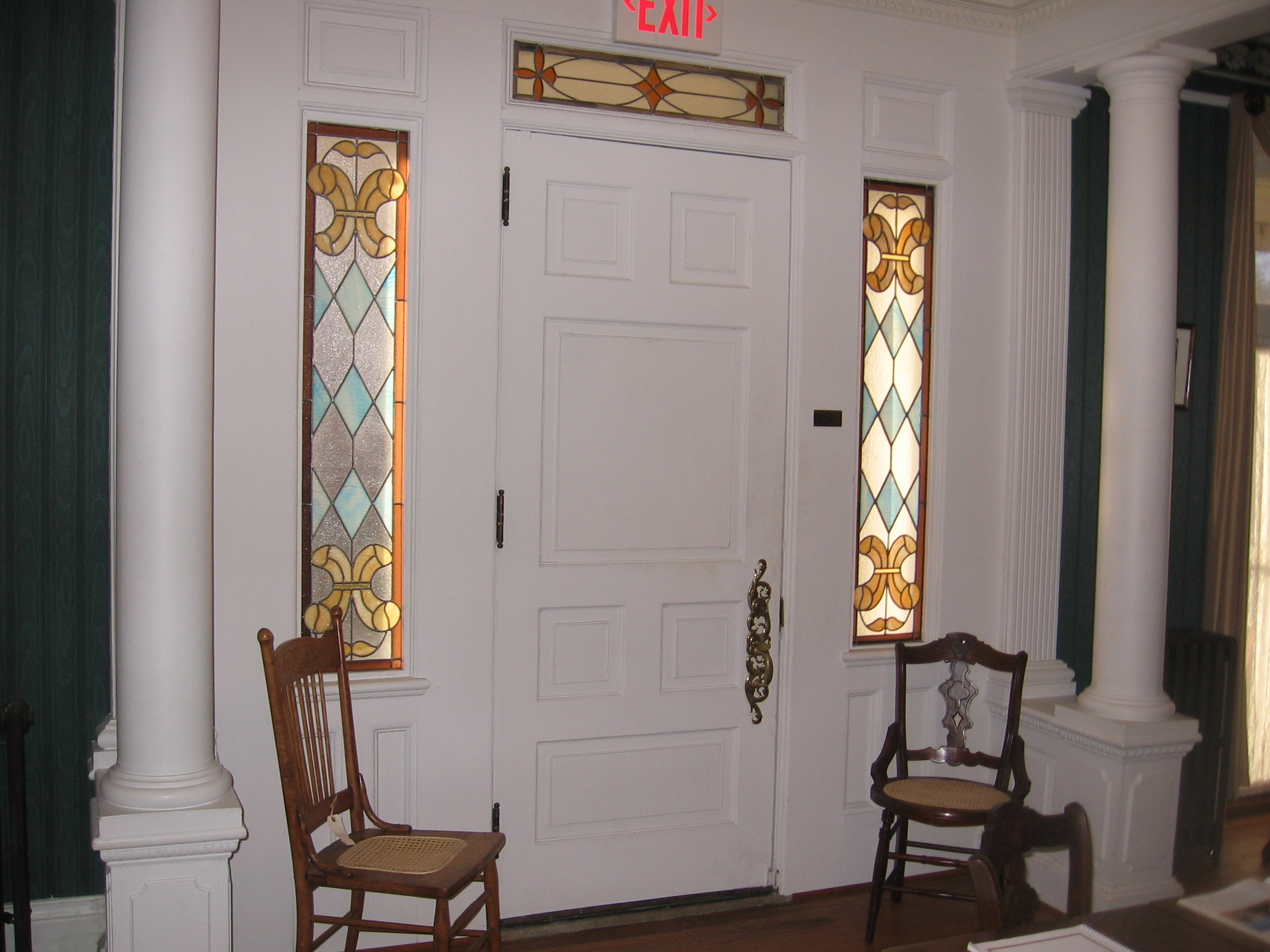
This is the main entrance to the Van Horn Mansion which leads into adjoining living rooms.

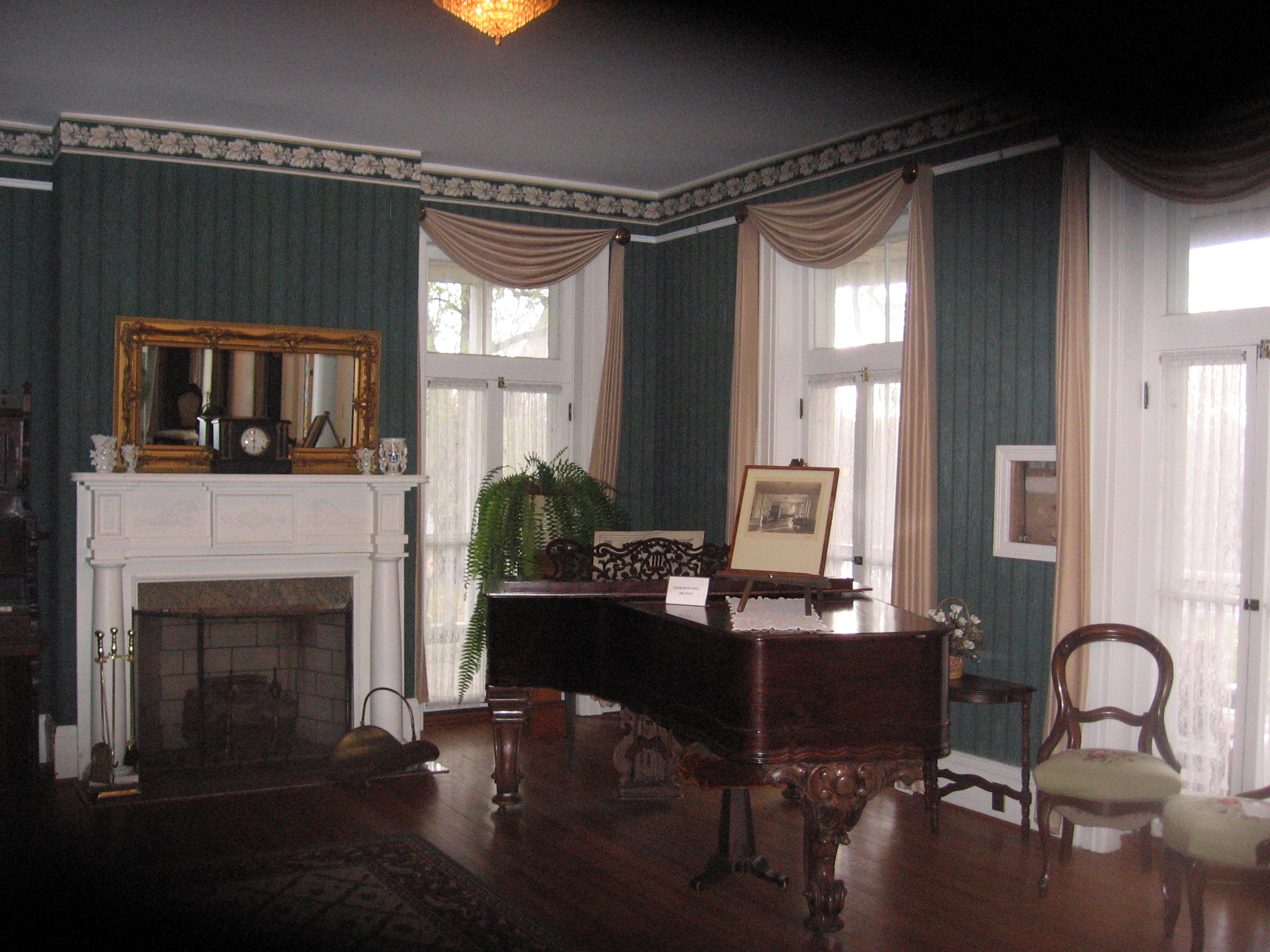
This south side of the living room was used for music and other forms of entertainment and also believed to be part of the area of the first Town of Newfane Board Meeting.

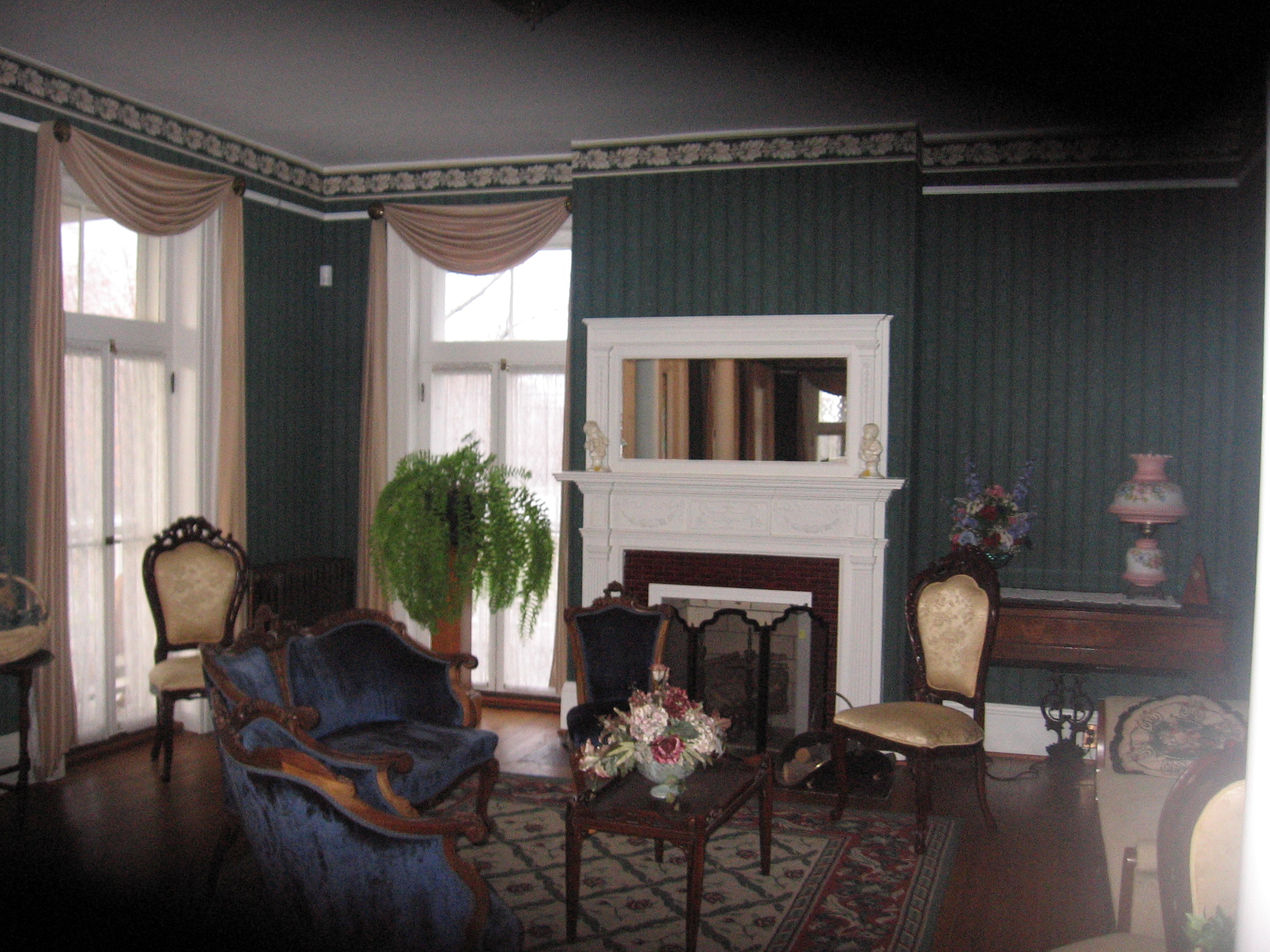
This north side of the living room of the Van Horn Mansion was used for entertaining and keeping warm by the fire.

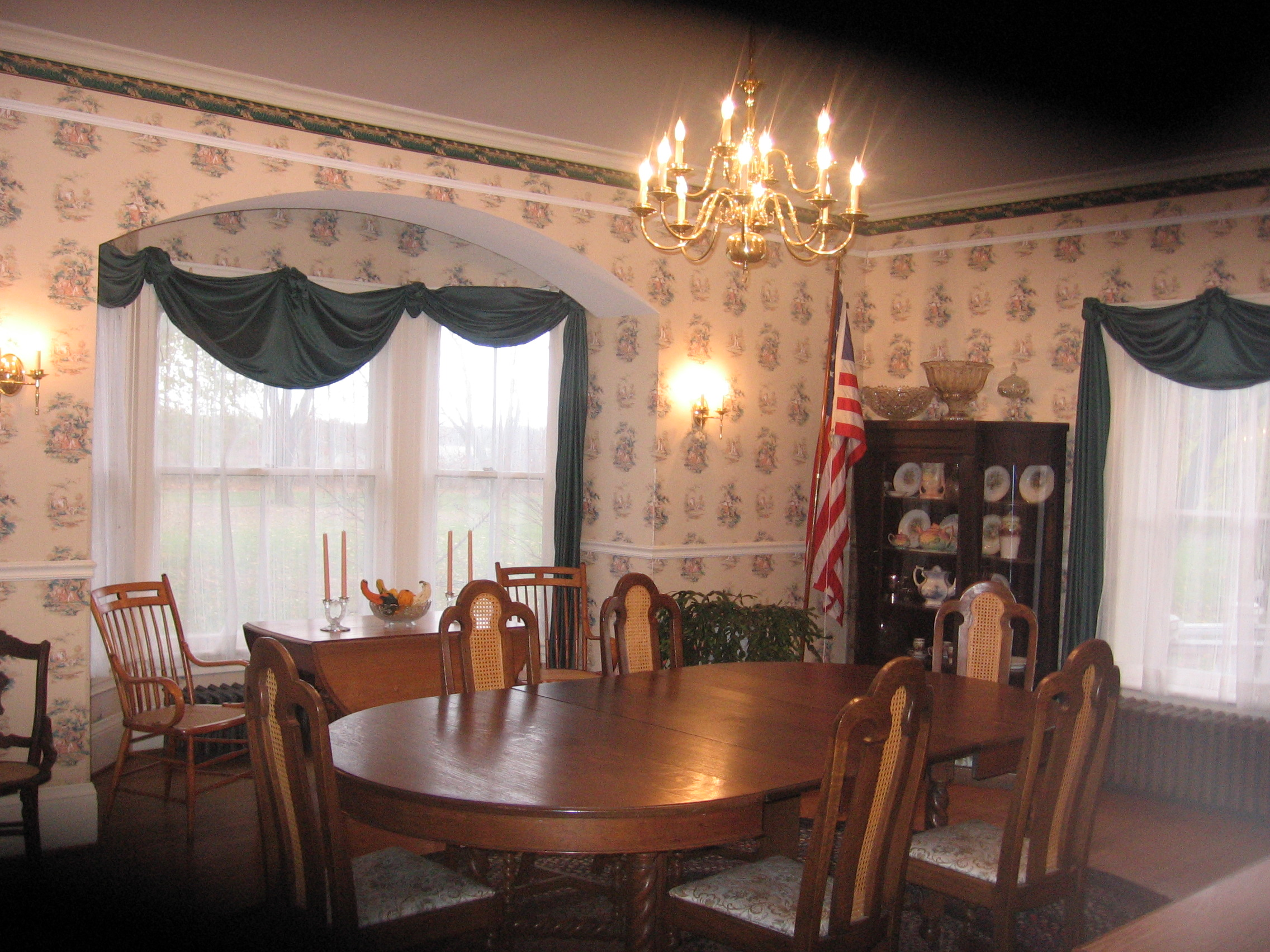
This dining room was added by Judge James' son, Burt, on the first floor, at a later date along with the third floor addition.

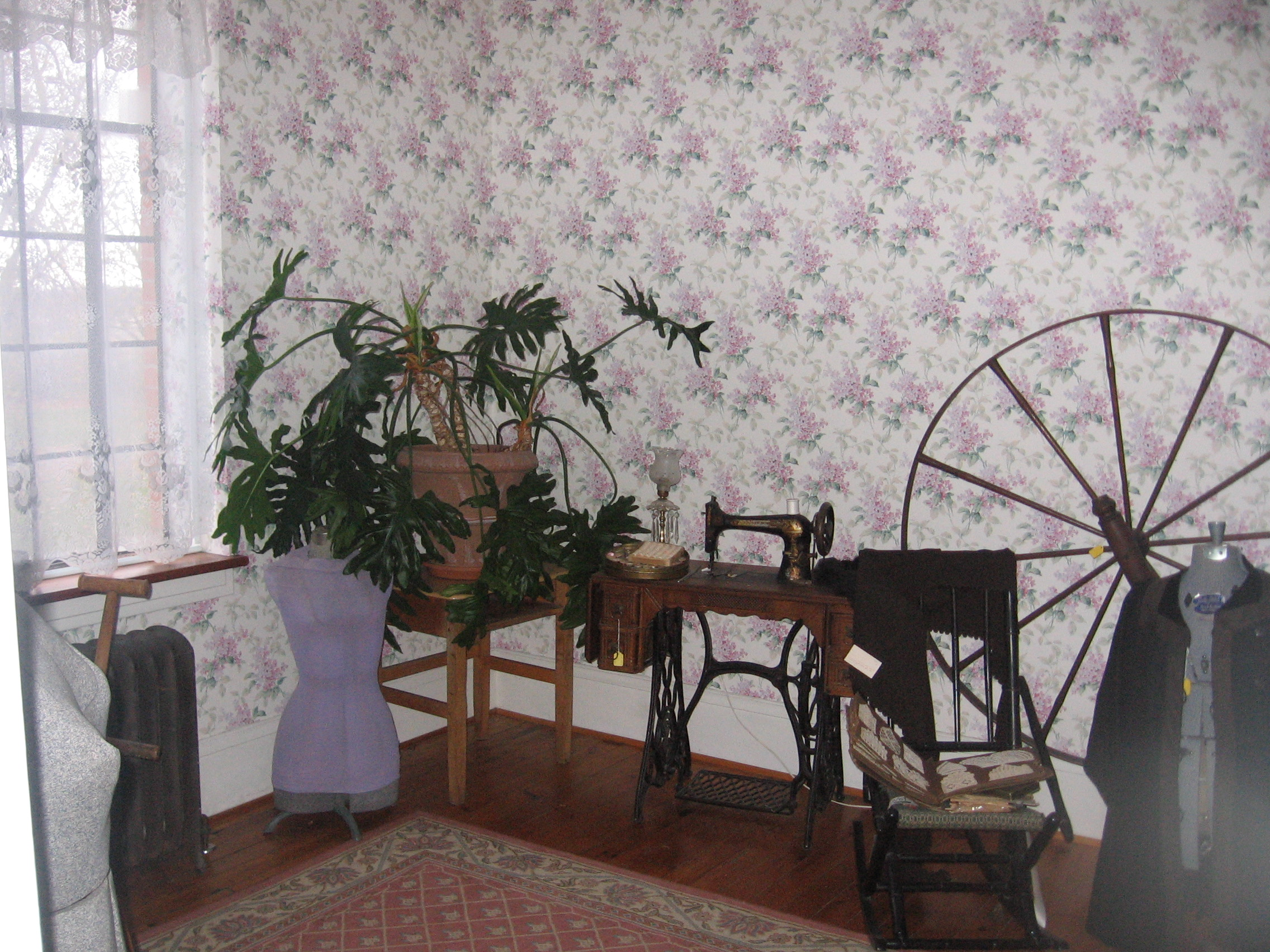
Located on the second floor was a seamstress room which was the place the sewer would work in to mend and make clothing for the Van Horn family.

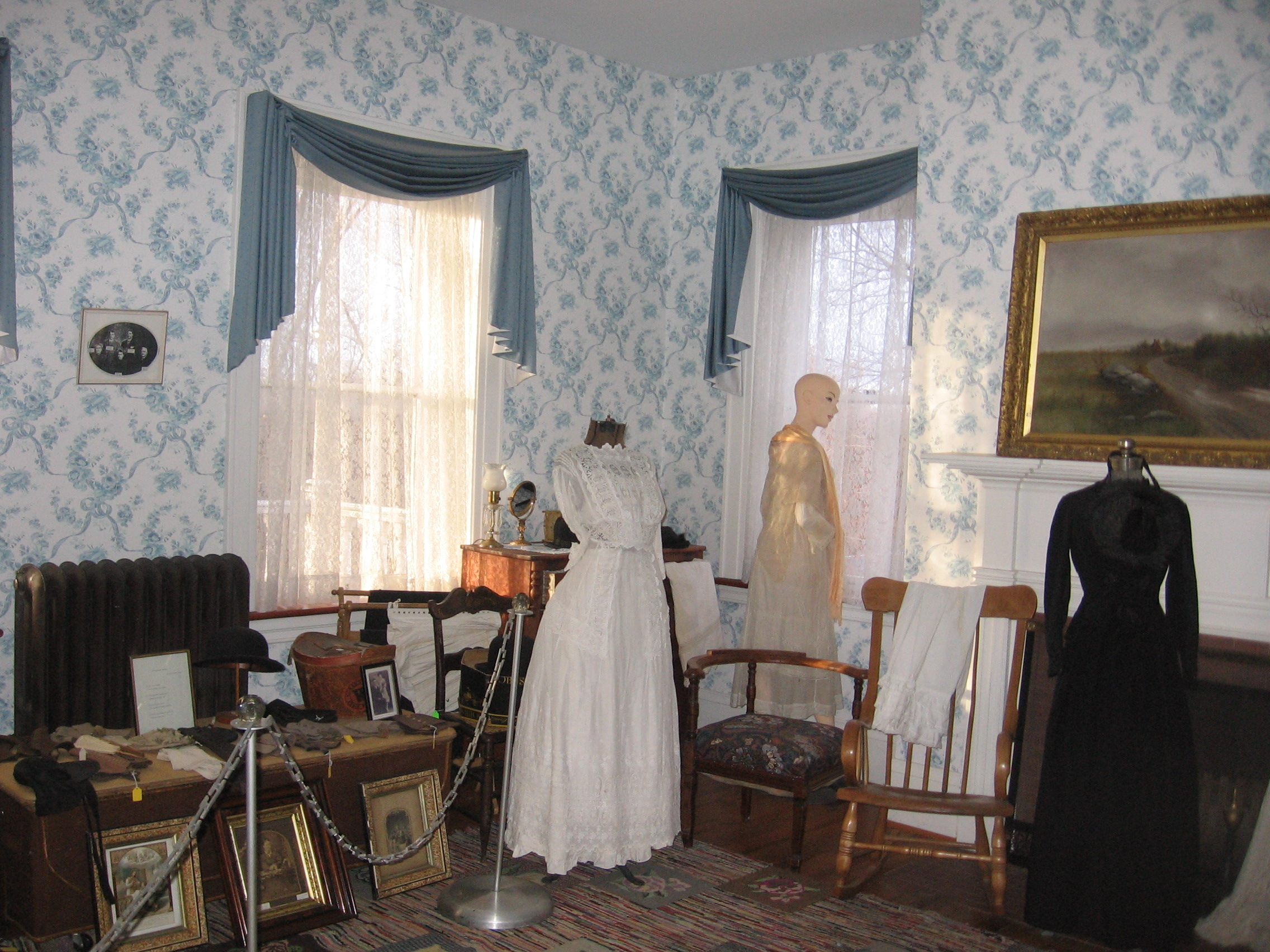
This is believed to be the main bedroom of Abigail and Judge James Van Horn also found on the second floor.

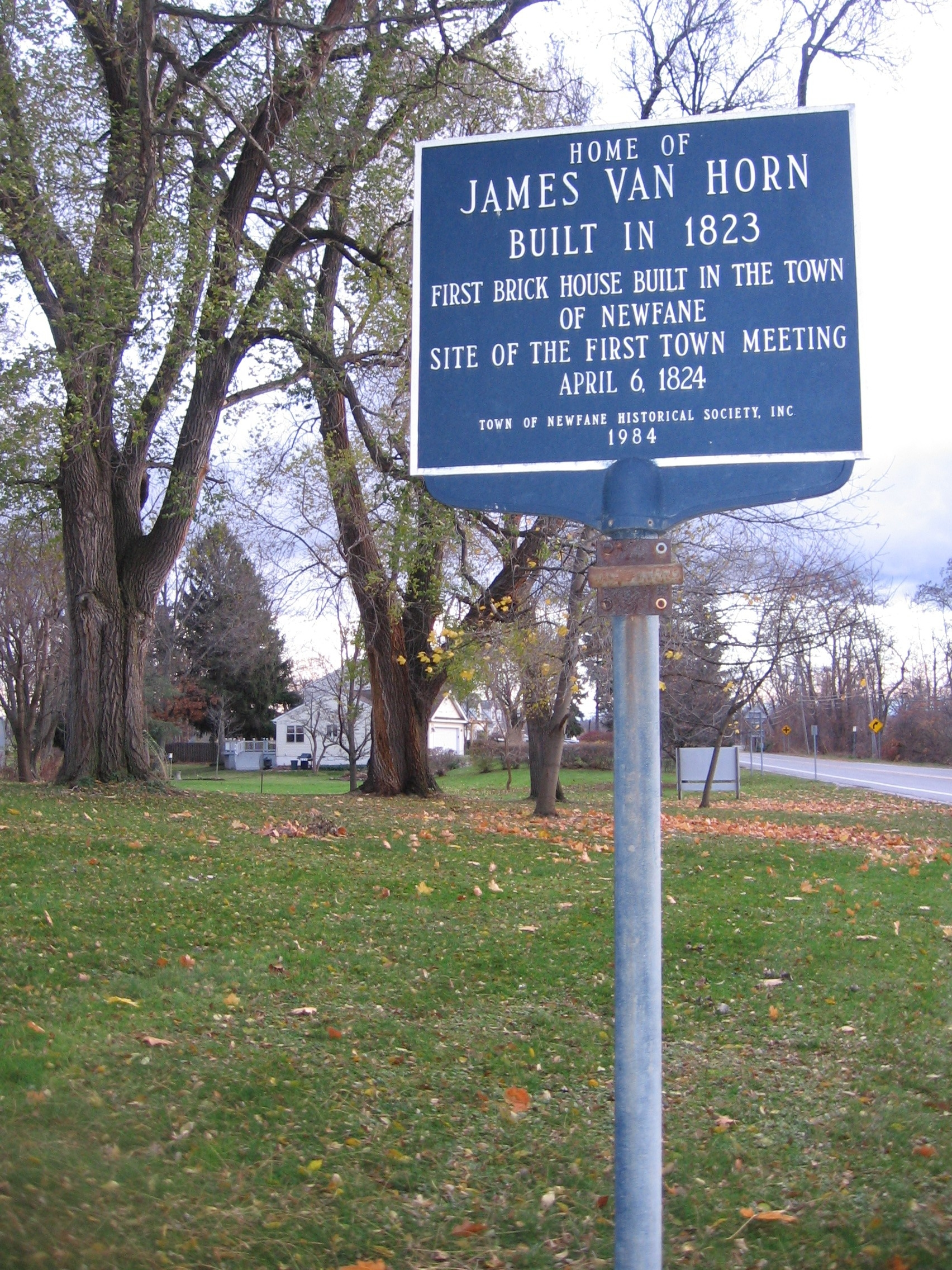
This is a sign which the Newfane Historical Society placed on the front lawn of the Van Horn Mansion in 1984.

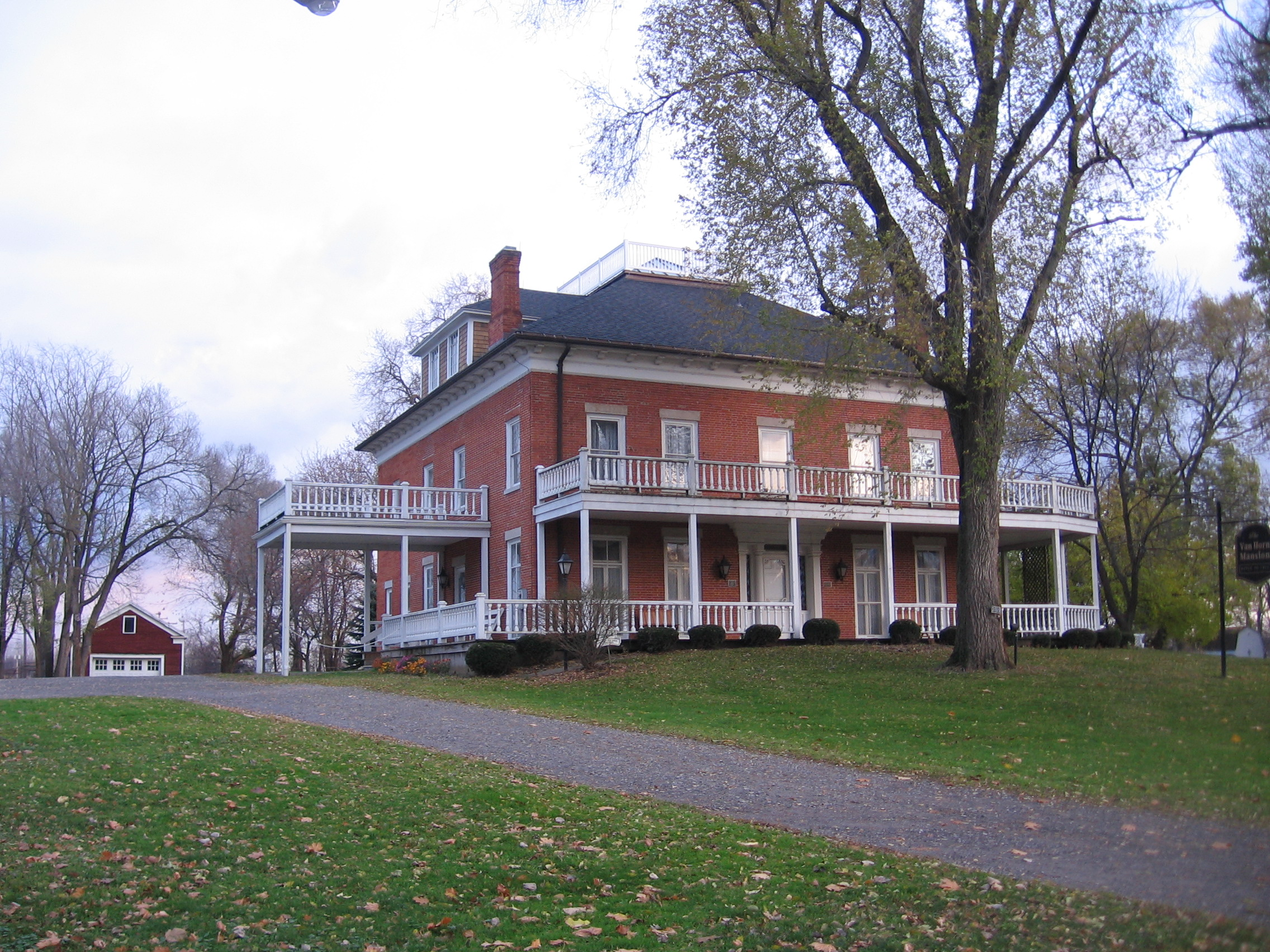
This is a view of the Van Horn Mansion from across the street.
