= Niagara Gorge Railroad =

Railway line in New York state, 1895–1935

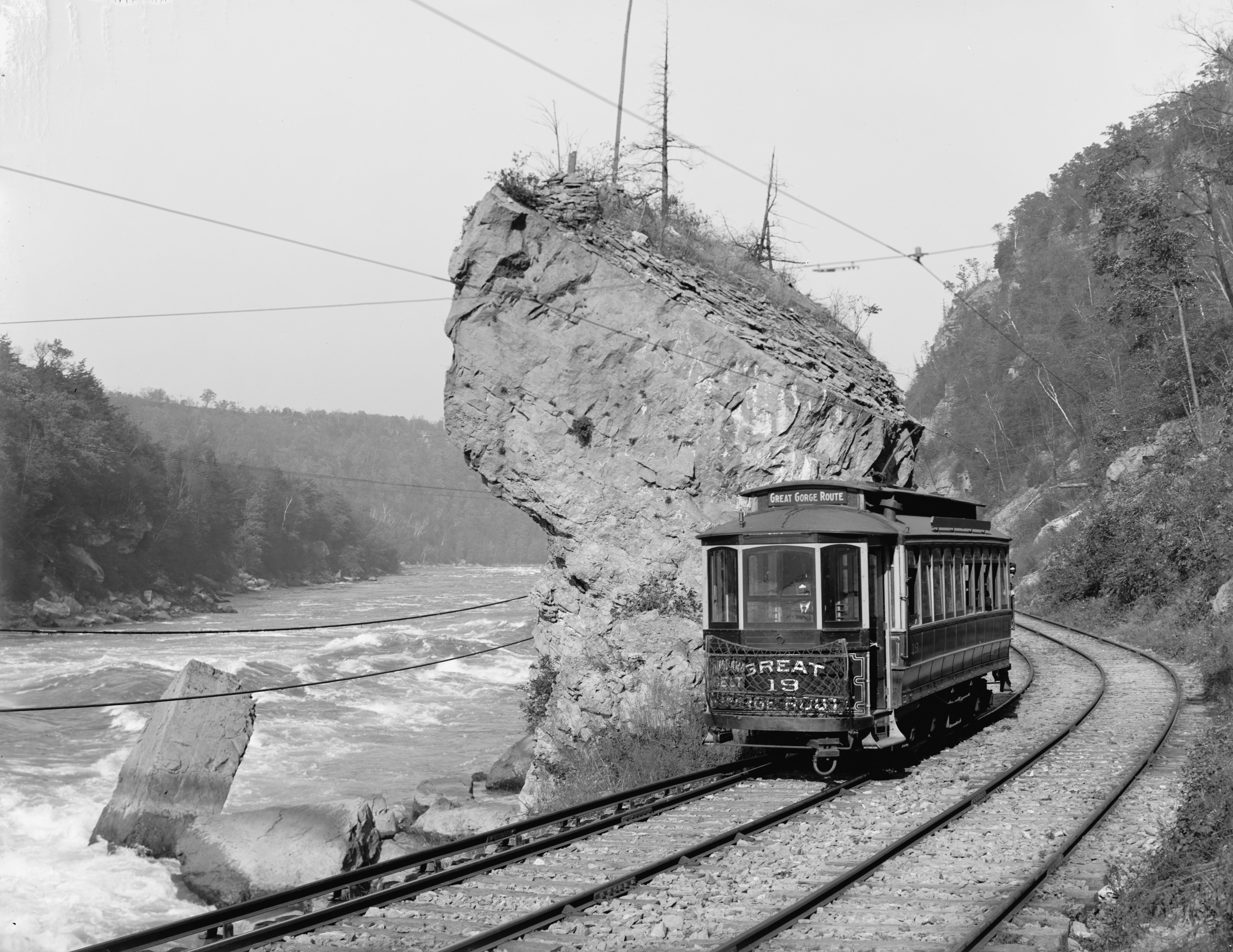
A trolley of the Niagara Gorge Railroad

The Niagara Gorge Railroad (forming part of the Great Gorge Route) was an interurban railway which ran at the bottom of the Niagara Gorge (at water level) from Niagara Falls, New York to Lewiston, New York.

Stations were at International Railway Terminal, Great Gorge Route Ticket Office, New York Central Depot, Schoellkopf Station, Rapids View, Whirlpool Rapids, Whirlpool Point, Ongiara Park, Giant Rock, Devil's Hole, Lewiston-Queenston Bridge and Lewiston Dock.

In Niagara Falls the GGR made connections with the International Railway Company (IRC), New York Central, Erie Railroad, Canadian National and Lehigh Valley. In Lewiston Dock connections were made with New York Central, IRC, the Lewiston & Youngstown Frontier and Canada Steamship Lines steamers to Toronto.

== History ==
The GGR was organized in 1895 as the Niagara Falls & Lewiston. It was reorganized and became the Niagara Gorge Railroad and operated until a rock slide on September 17, 1935. The Great Gorge Route was part of the "Niagara Gorge Belt Line". This service was jointly with the IRC "Canadian Scenic Route" on the Canadian side of the river from Niagara Falls, Ontario to Queenston. Crossings were made on the Honeymoon Bridge in Niagara Falls and the Queenston–Lewiston Bridge. The IRC in Niagara Falls interchanged with the Niagara, St. Catharines and Toronto Railway (NS&T), Canadian National, Toronto, Hamilton and Buffalo Railway, Pere Marquette Railway, and New York Central subsidiary Michigan Central Railroad.

== Gallery ==
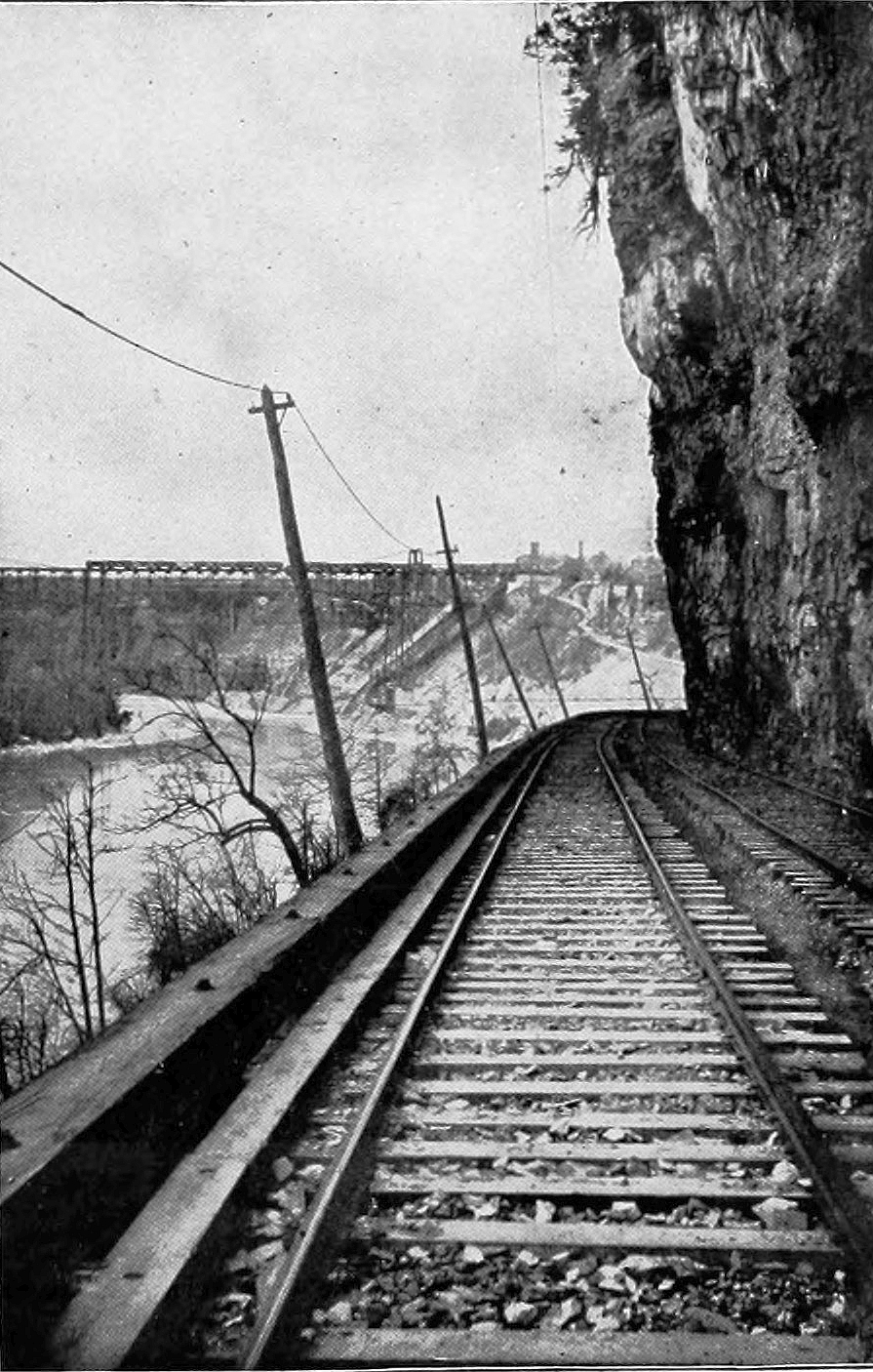
1891

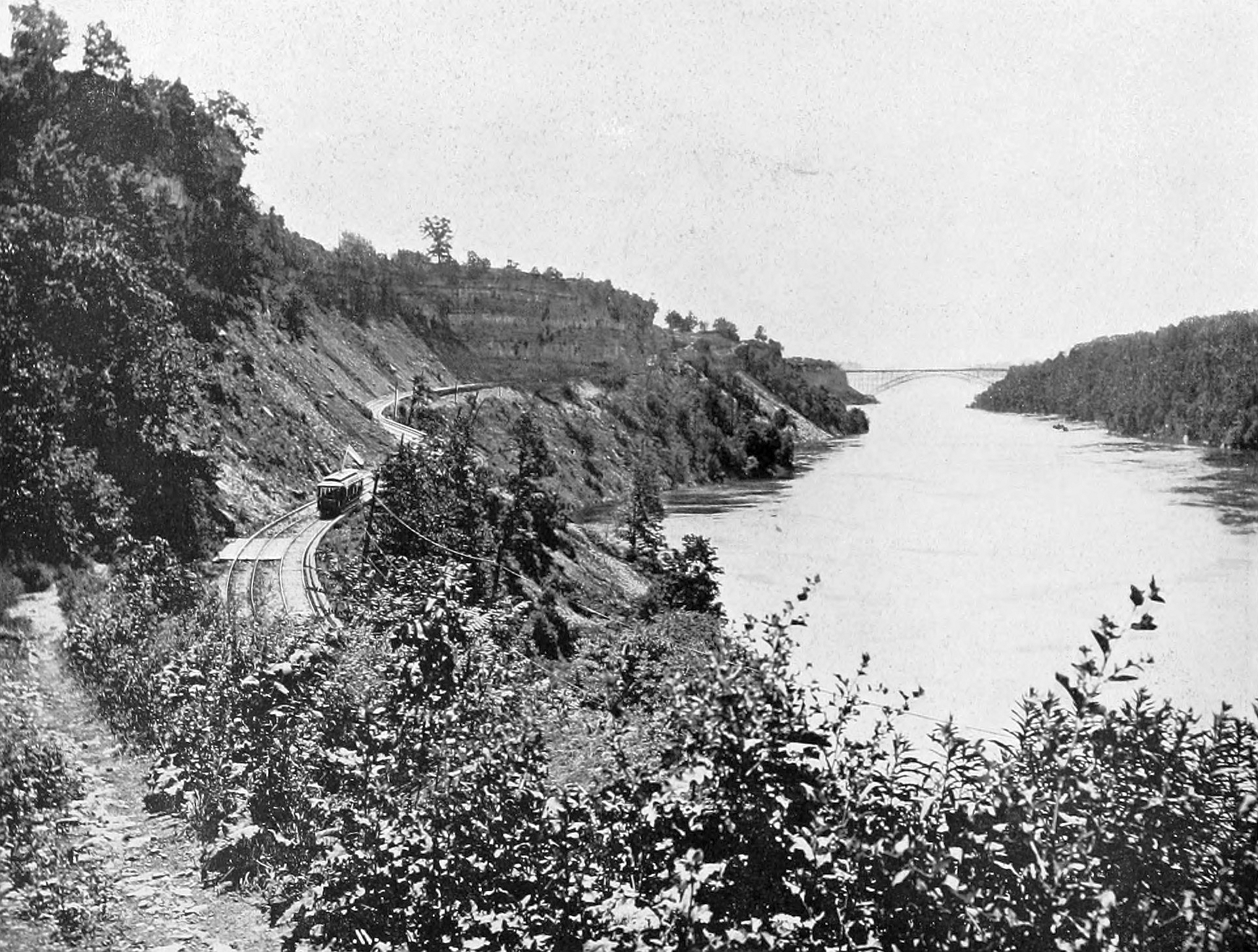
1900

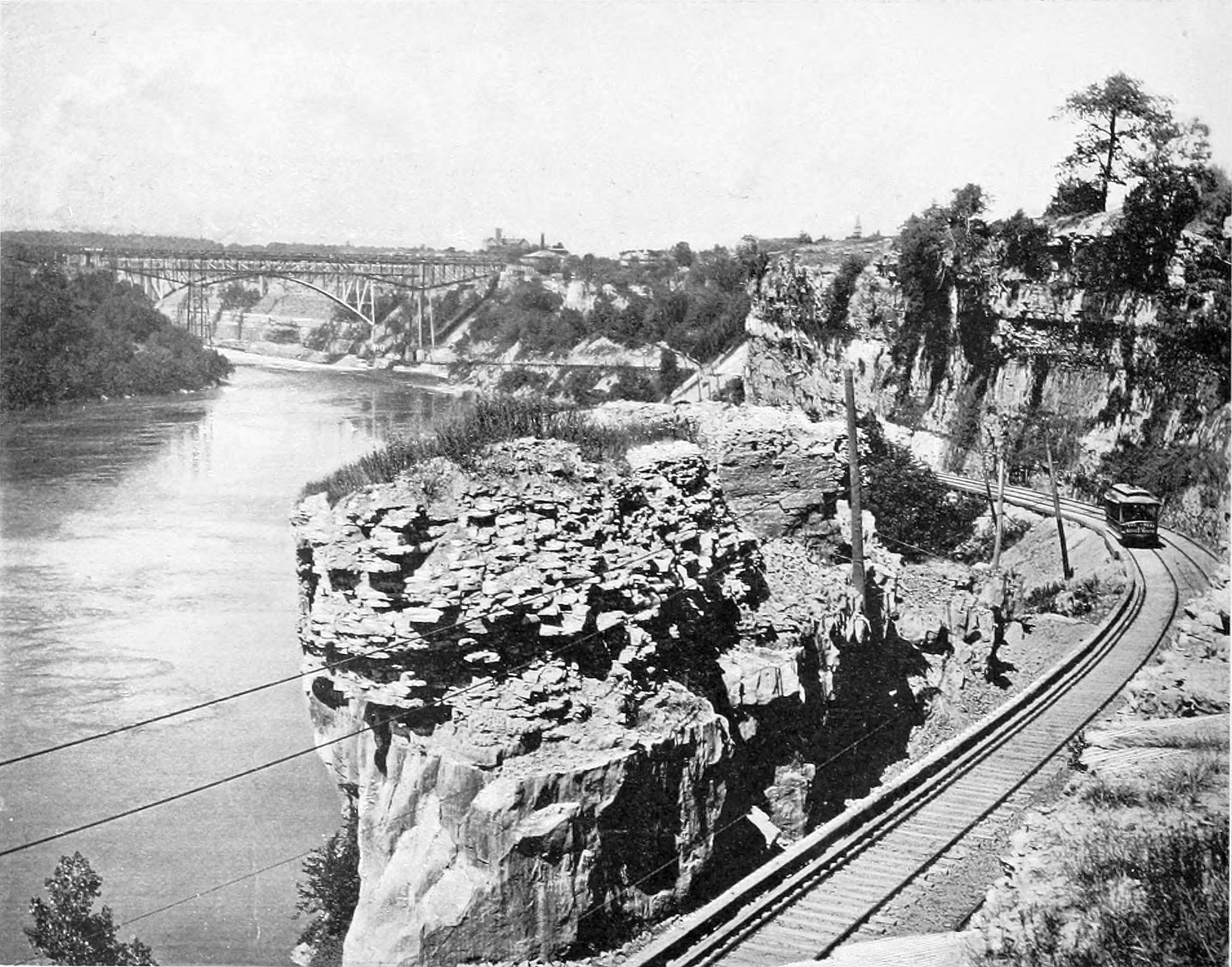
1900

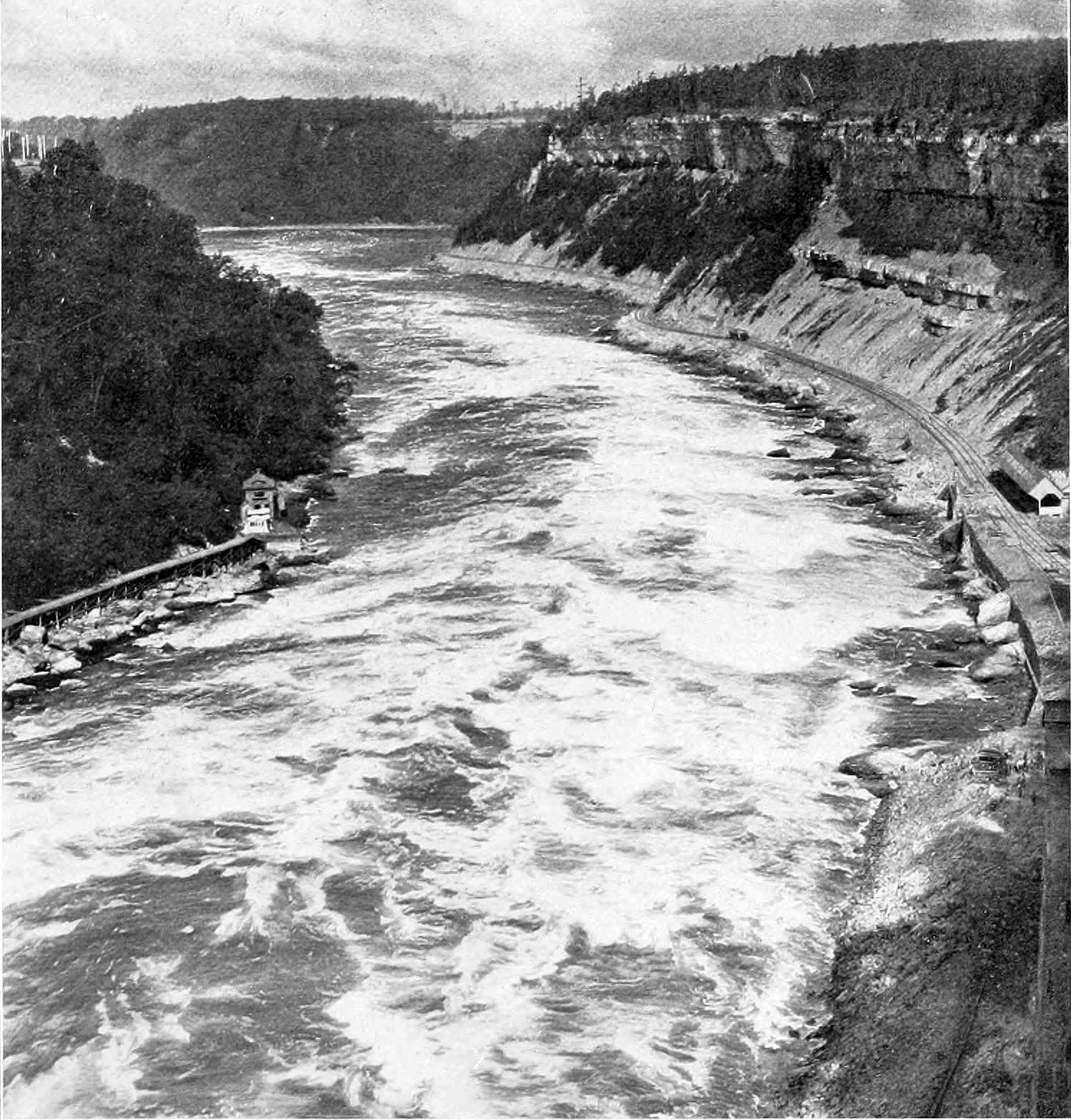
1900

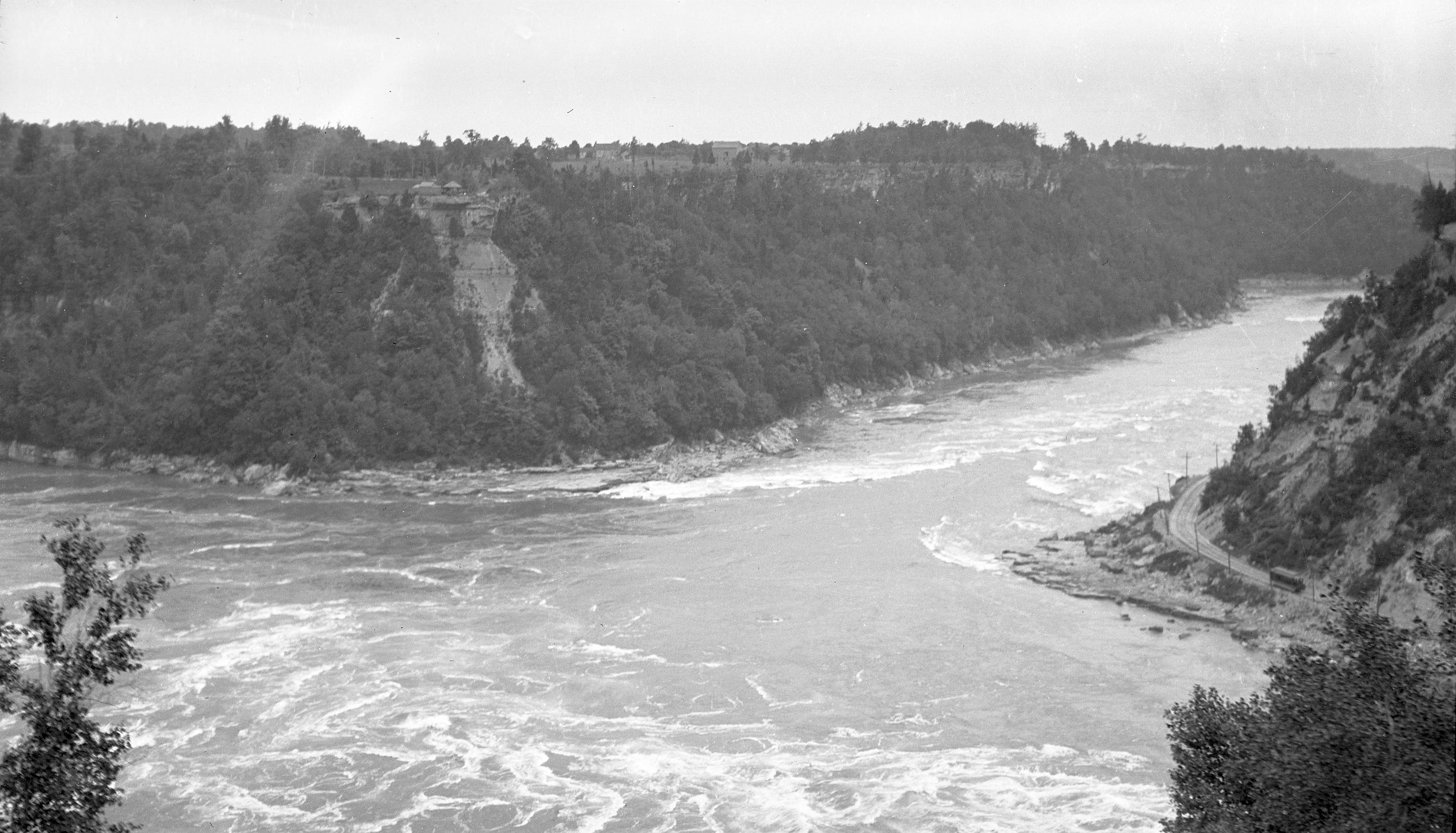
View of Niagara Whirlpool from Canadian side with Niagara Gorge Railroad visible in bottom right, 1911

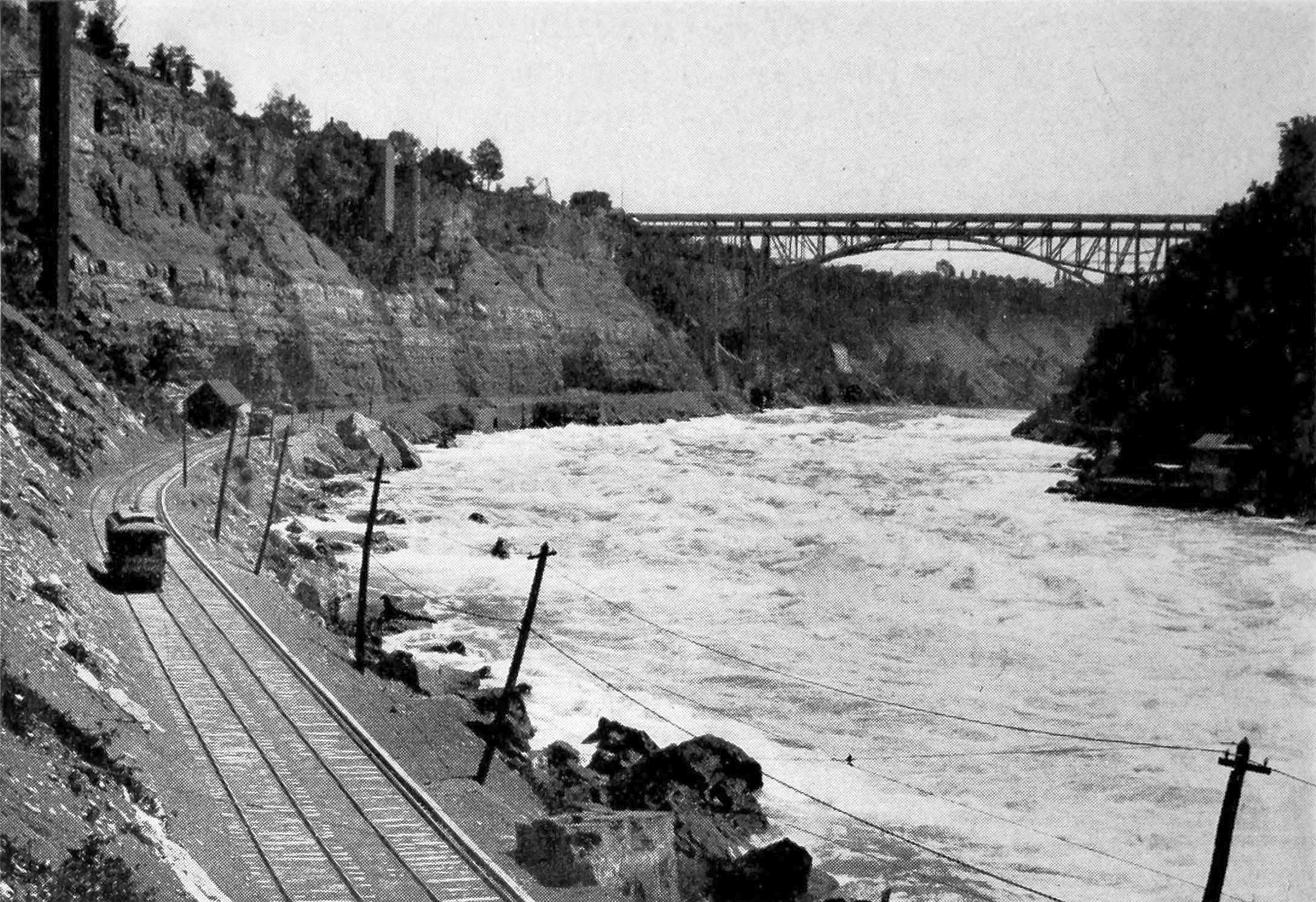
1913

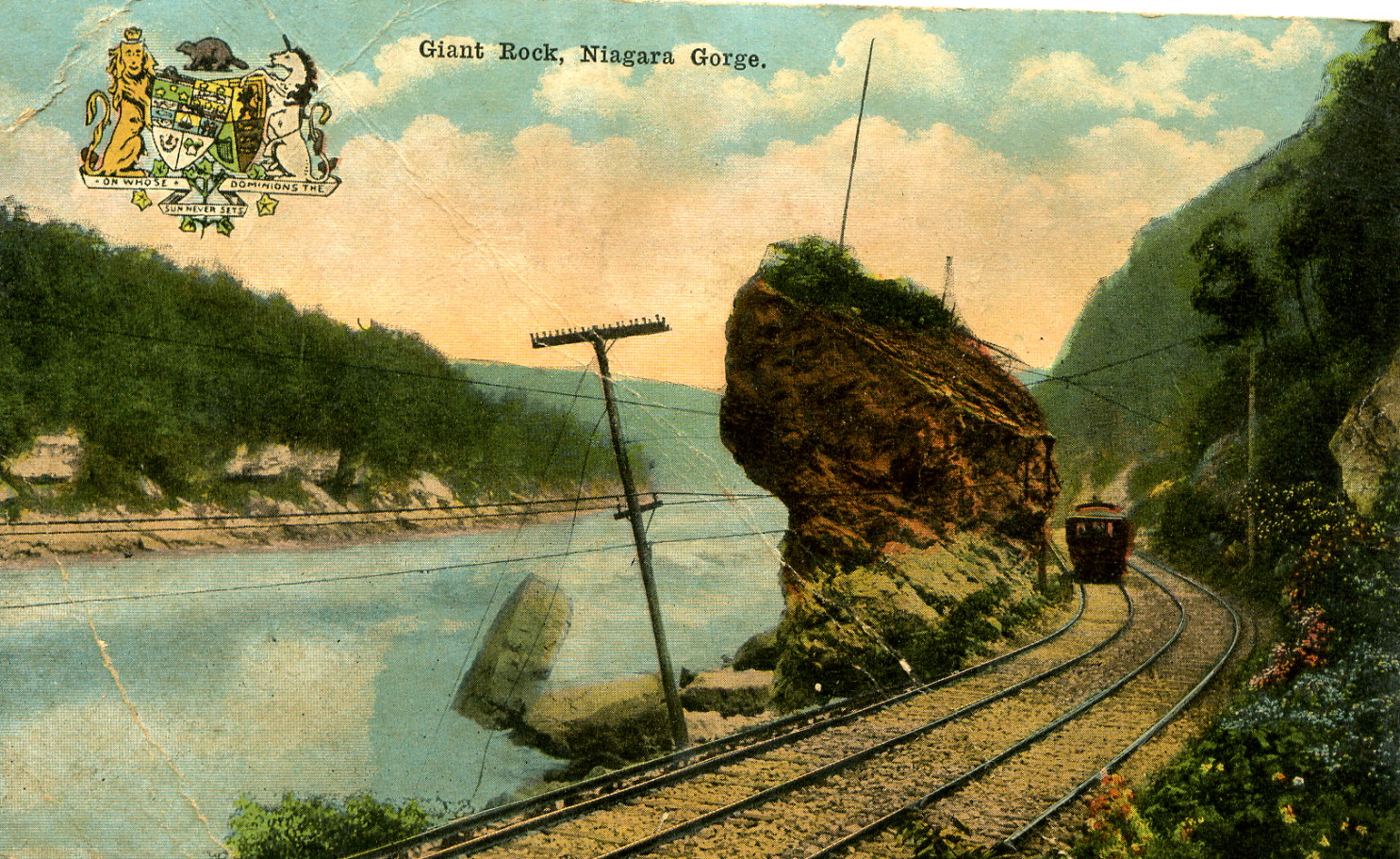
Postcard
