= First Baptist Church (Newfane, New York) =

Historic church in New York, United States

- U.S. National Register of Historic Places
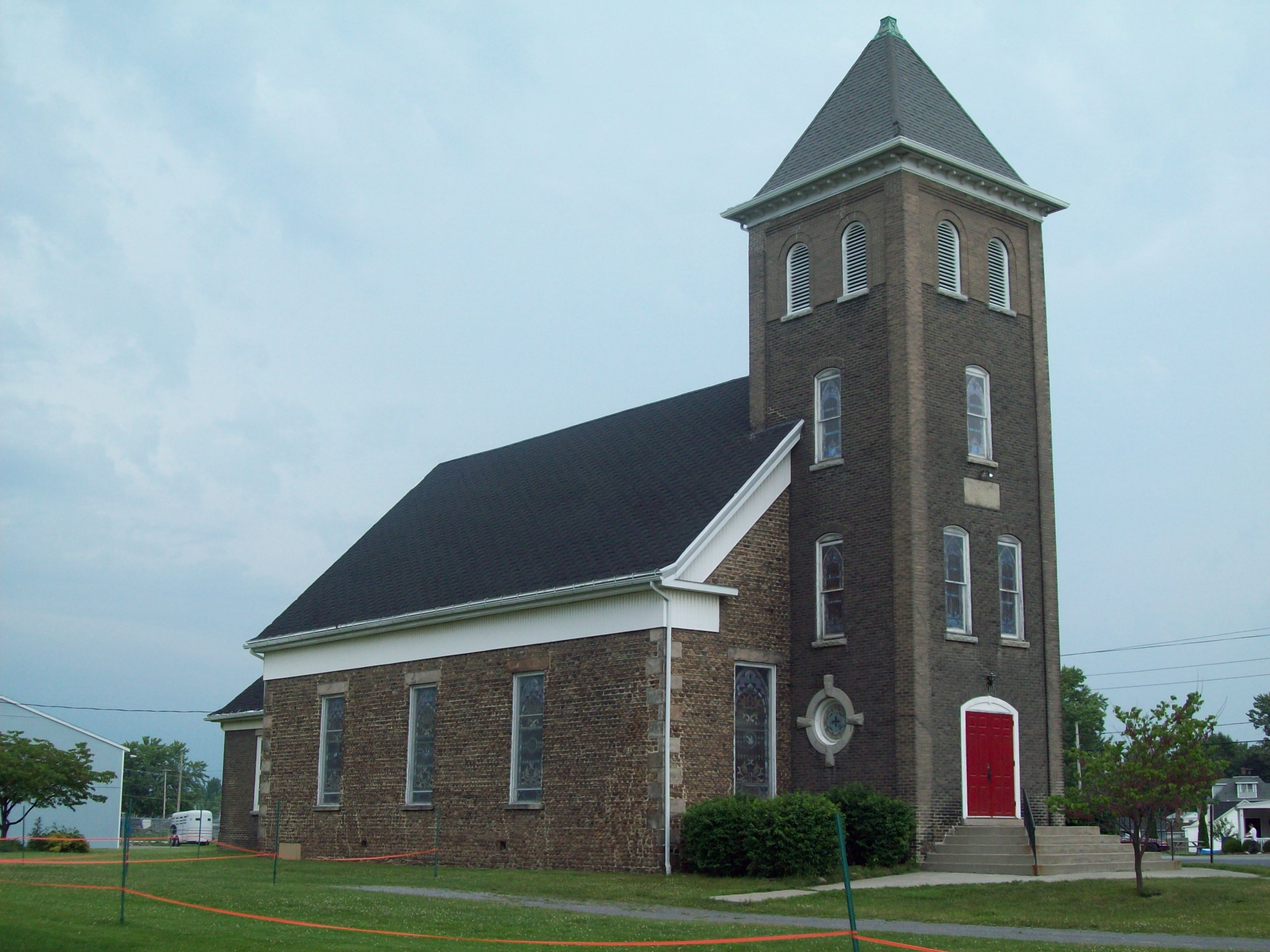
- First Baptist Church, June 2009

- Location within New York Location within the United States
- Location: 6073 East Ave., Newfane, New York
- Coordinates: 43°17′11″N 78°42′29″W
- Area: 1.3 acres (0.53 ha)
- Built: 1843
- Architectural style: Greek Revival, Romanesque
- MPS: Cobblestone Architecture of New York State MPS
- NRHP reference No.: 04000987
- Added to NRHP: September 15, 2004

First Baptist Church is a historic Baptist church located at Newfane in Niagara County, New York. It is a Greek Revival style cobblestone church constructed in 1843. It is one of approximately 47 cobblestone buildings in Niagara County.

First Baptist Church was formed in 1829, when Andrew Jackson took office as the seventh president of the United States, four years after the opening of the Erie Canal. In 1845 the church took a courageous moral position against slavery. At that time the Fugitive Slave Act prohibited speaking against slavery or helping slaves escape. The church did both.

It was listed on the National Register of Historic Places in 2004.

The church is part of the American Baptist Churches in the U.S.A.
