= Hess Road, New York =

Hamlet in New York, United States

Coordinates: 43°18′36″N 78°38′53″W

Hess Road is a hamlet in the town of Newfane in Niagara County, New York, United States.
