= Eighteen Mile Creek (Niagara County) =

- Location of the mouth of the Eighteen Mile Creek in New York State. Eighteen Mile Creek (Niagara County) (the United States)

Location
- Country: United States
- State: New York

Physical characteristics
- Source
  - location: Town of Lockport, Niagara County
  - coordinates: 43°10′29″N 78°41′20″W
- Mouth: Lake Ontario
  - location: Olcott, Niagara County
  - coordinates: 43°20′21″N 78°43′07″W
- Length: 26 mi (42 km)
- Basin size: 90.7 sq mi (235 km^{2})

Eighteen Mile Creek, or Eighteenmile Creek, is a tributary of Lake Ontario located entirely in Niagara County, New York in the United States. The name of "Eighteen Mile" Creek refers not to the length of the creek, but to its distance from the Niagara River to the west.

Originating just north of City of Lockport in the Town of Lockport, it travels approximately 26 miles (42 km) northward, winding through the Town of Newfane. A dam by the community of Burt forms a widening of the creek as far upstream as the community of Newfane. Eighteen Mile Creek enters Lake Ontario at Olcott harbor.

Much of the course of the creek is followed by New York State Route 78.

== Watershed and course ==
The Eighteen Mile Creek drainage basin is located along the southern shore of Lake Ontario in Niagara County, New York. The creek flows generally to the north and discharges into Lake Ontario, through Olcott Harbor, approximately 18 miles (29 km) east of the mouth of the Niagara River. The watershed has a drainage area of approximately 58,056 acres (90.7 sq mi; 234.9 km^{2}) and includes Eighteen Mile Creek and its two main tributaries, the East Branch and the Gulf, as well as minor tributaries. In addition, much of the flow in the main branch of Eighteen Mile Creek comes from water diverted from the New York State Barge Canal.

The natural topography of the area can be characterized as two relatively flat plains at different elevations separated by the Niagara Escarpment. The southernmost portion of the watershed is at a higher elevation than the remainder of the watershed and is separated by the Niagara Escarpment along the northern portion of the City of Lockport. The watershed lies entirely within Niagara County and encompasses portions of the Towns of Cambria, Lockport (including a portion of the City of Lockport), Royalton, Hartland, Newfane, and Wilson. The majority of the watershed can be characterized as a rural area comprising agricultural lands, with scattered residences along roadways, and rural villages; including Olcott, Newfane, and Gasport. A portion of one urban area, the City of Lockport, falls within the watershed and is the most densely populated area within the watershed. Commercial and industrial uses are concentrated in the City of Lockport.

The main branch of Eighteen Mile Creek originates southeast of the City of Lockport, in the vicinity of Keck and Chestnut Ridge Roads, on the south side of the Niagara Escarpment. It travels northwest through the city until it is diverted underground near Vine Street. It then flows north in an underground culvert and resurfaces briefly south of the canal. It travels a short distance under the Canal, to a point near Clinton Street north of the canal, where it again resurfaces. It continues generally north, descending approximately 240 feet (73 m) over the Niagara Escarpment. As the creek descends the escarpment, it travels through the abandoned Flintkote factory property on Mill Street, and adjacent to the Lockport Wastewater Treatment Plant. The creek then flows north through the Town of Newfane before draining into Lake Ontario at Olcott Harbor.

== Environmental protection ==
On March 13, 2012, the section of the creek north of the canal in Lockport was added to the U.S. Superfund National Priorities List.

A section of Eighteen Mile Creek was designated as an Area of Concern (AOC) by the International Joint Commission because of an existing fish consumption advisory, benthic population decline, a degradation of fish and wildlife populations, prevalence of bird and animal deformities or reproductive problems and restrictions on dredging. Over the years, numerous contaminants have been identified in creek sediments which have a detrimental effect to the AOC and Lake Ontario. These contaminants include but are not limited to: polychlorinated biphenyls (PCBs), mercury, dioxins and furans, dieldrin, mirex, DDT, lead, and copper. Sediments contaminated with these substances have directly contributed to the impairments just mentioned.

The AOC is relatively pristine to the naked eye. This section of Eighteen Mile Creek flows through a steep-sided, undeveloped wooded gorge, where habitat disturbances are minimal. The extensive beds of emergent and submergent aquatic vegetation in this area account for an estimated 65 acres (260,000 m^{2}), comprising one of the largest coastal wetlands in the western portion of Lake Ontario. These wetlands and undisturbed woodlands bordering Eighteen Mile Creek provide valuable habitats for wildlife that are uncommon in Niagara County's coastal area.

A variety of bird species inhabit the area, including great blue heron, green heron, mallard, wood duck, belted kingfisher, marsh wren, common yellowthroat, red-winged blackbird, and swamp sparrow. Eighteen Mile Creek is particularly significant because large concentrations of Coho and Chinook salmon and brown trout migrate from Lake Ontario into the creek each fall. In addition, steelhead migrate into Eighteen Mile Creek during the fall and between late February and April. Due to the importance of this area, the New York State Department of Environmental Conservation has determined that, "Disturbances of wetland vegetation, including submergent beds, through dredging, filling, or bulkheading [excluding Olcott Harbor], would result in a direct loss of valuable habitat area."

The mission of the Eighteen Mile Creek Remedial Action Plan (RAP) is to restore the chemical, physical and biological integrity of the ecosystem in the Eighteen Mile Creek Area of Concern in a manner that reflects the communities concern for the preservation and protection of the waterway. Specific goals of the RAP are the protection and enhancement of human health, fish and wildlife, aesthetics, recreation and the economy of the Eighteen Mile Creek Area of Concern. Bathing and aquatic life have been established as the best uses of Eighteen Mile Creek through a public process under the New York State Stream Classification System. The RAP is designed to restore these uses where they have been impaired and to move toward the reduction of all sources of pollutants.

== See also ==
- List of rivers in New York
