= Ridgewood, Niagara County, New York =

Hamlet in New York, United States

Coordinates: 43°15′01″N 78°38′50″W

Ridgewood is a hamlet in the town of Newfane in Niagara County, New York, United States.
