= Newfane, New York =

- Town
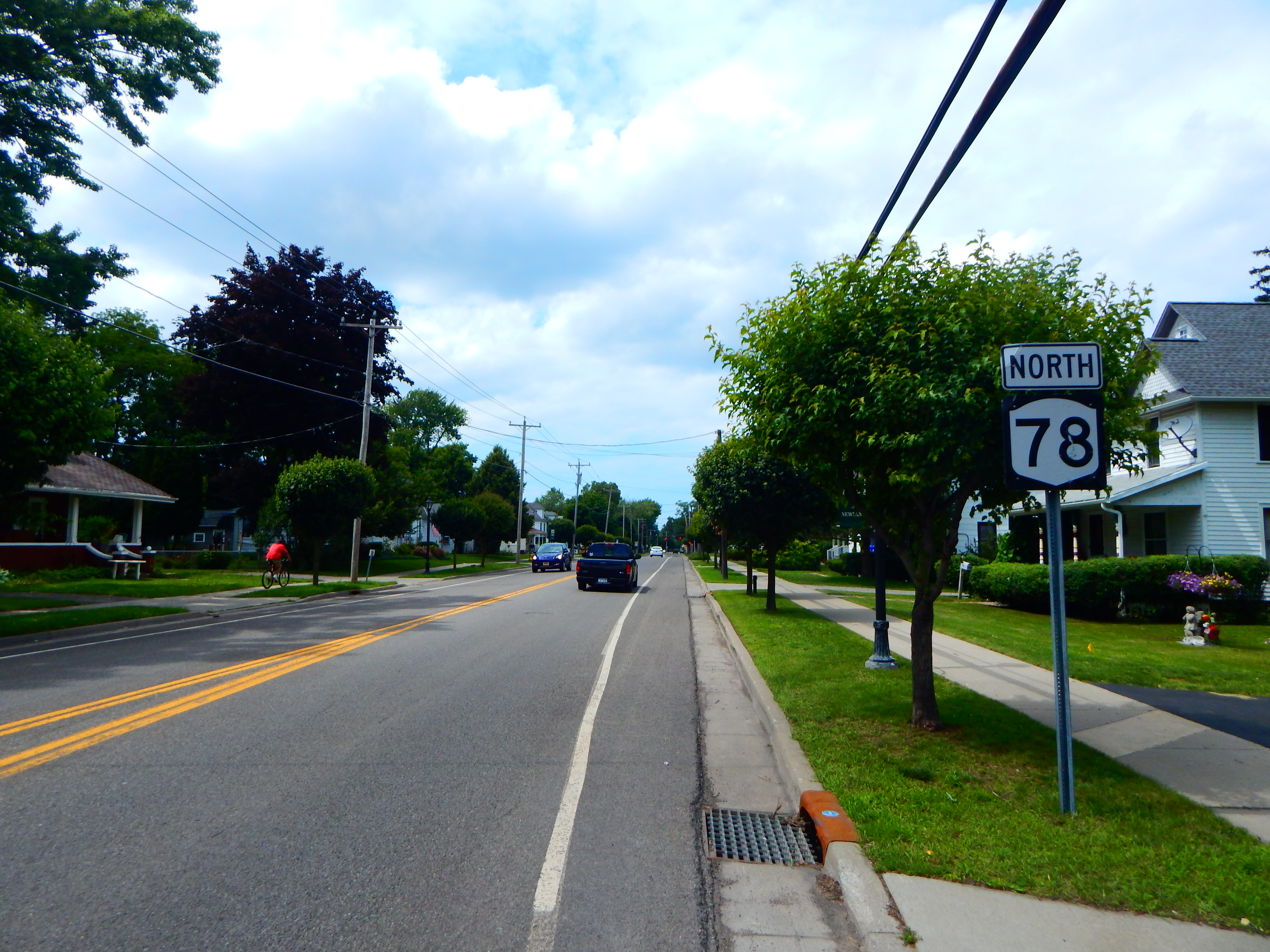
- NY 78 through the hamlet of Newfane
- Motto: "Together We Can"
- Location in Niagara County and the state of New York.
- Coordinates: 43°17′51″N 78°42′16″W
- Country: United States
- State: New York
- County: Niagara

Government
  - Type: Town Council
  - Town Supervisor: John Syracuse (R)

Area
  - Total: 53.48 sq mi (138.51 km^{2})
  - Land: 51.82 sq mi (134.22 km^{2})
  - Water: 1.66 sq mi (4.29 km^{2})
- Elevation: 344 ft (105 m)

Population (2010)
  - Total: 9,666
  - Estimate (2016): 9,354
  - Density: 180.5/sq mi (69.69/km^{2})
- Time zone: UTC-5 (Eastern (EST))
  - Summer (DST): UTC-4 (EDT)
- ZIP Codes: 14108 (Newfane); 14028 (Burt); 14126 (Olcott); 14008 (Appleton); 14094 (Lockport)
- Area code: 716
- FIPS code: 36-50232
- GNIS feature ID: 0979262
- Website: townofnewfaneny.gov

Newfane is a town in Niagara County, New York, United States. The population was 9,666 at the 2010 census.

The Town of Newfane is in the north-central part of the county, north of the City of Lockport.

== History ==
The Town of Newfane was established in 1824 by Wesley R. Rupert and others. The Newfane name was selected by early settlers who had roots in Newfane, Vermont. The town was created from portions of the Towns of Hartland, Somerset, and Wilson. The first town meeting was held at the Van Horn Mansion in 1824. The Newfane township consists of six hamlets; Appleton, Burt, the Newfane village, Olcott, Ridgewood and the northern portion of Wright's Corners. The Newfane village was once named "Charlotteville," but renamed Newfane, and Olcott was named Kempville in early times.

Its school district includes an early childhood center, an elementary school, a middle school, and one high school. The school's mascot is a panther.

In Olcott, there is a monument with a handful of names of soldiers who fought for the Union cause in the American Civil War. In total, 252 Union soldiers came from Newfane, of whom about 55 died during service. Olcott is also home to an original Herschell Carousel. The Carousel was built in 1928.

The town has two properties on the National Register of Historic Places: the First Baptist Church and the Van Horn Mansion.

== Notable people ==
- Steve Geltz, Tampa Bay Rays pitcher
- Tom Jolls, TV weatherman and children's show host
- Del Mason, former MLB player
- Burt Van Horn, former US Congressman
- John Beilein, professional basketball coach and college coach at the University of Michigan.
- Ron Altbach, musician, King Harvest, Celebration.

== Geography ==
According to the United States Census Bureau, the town has a total area of 53.5 square miles (139 km^{2}), of which 51.8 square miles (134 km^{2}) is land and 1.6 square miles (4.1 km^{2}) (3.05%) is water. It also includes Wright's Corners. Newfane's northern border is Lake Ontario. The town's south border is shared with the Town of Lockport.

=== Adjacent cities and towns ===
- Town of Lockport - south
- City of Lockport - south
- Town of Wilson - west
- Town of Somerset - east
- Town of Hartland - east
- Lake Ontario - north

== Major highways in the Town of Newfane ==
- New York State Route 18 (Lake Rd.), east–west highway across the north part of town roughly paralleling Lake Ontario.
- New York State Route 78 (Lockport-Olcott Rd.), north–south roadway through the town from the Lockport town line to its northern terminus at Lake Rd. (NY 18) in Olcott, NY.
- New York State Route 104 (Ridge Rd.), east–west roadway through the town from the Cambria town line to the Hartland town line. (Runs concurrently with NY 78 a short distance in Wrights Corners.)

== Demographics ==
Historical population
Census	Pop.	Note	%±
1830	1,448		—
1840	2,372		63.8%
1850	3,271		37.9%
1860	3,363		2.8%
1870	3,097		−7.9%
1880	3,462		11.8%
1890	3,170		−8.4%
1900	3,248		2.5%
1910	4,060		25.0%
1920	3,515		−13.4%
1930	4,225		20.2%
1940	4,635		9.7%
1950	5,801		25.2%
1960	8,523		46.9%
1970	9,459		11.0%
1980	9,268		−2.0%
1990	8,996		−2.9%
2000	9,657		7.3%
2010	9,666		0.1%
2016 (est.)	9,354	▼	−3.2%
U.S. Decennial Census

As of the census of 2000, there were 9,657 people, 3,597 households, and 2,633 families residing in the town. The population density was 186.3 inhabitants per square mile (71.9/km^{2}). There were 3,854 housing units at an average density of 74.3 units per square mile (28.7 units/km^{2}). The racial makeup of the town was 90.76% White, 7.15% Black or African American, 0.54% Native American, 0.20% Asian, 0.51% from other races, and 0.85% from two or more races. Hispanic or Latino of any race were 0.98% of the population.

There were 3,597 households, out of which 33.9% had children under the age of 18 living with them, 59.4% were married couples living together, 9.8% had a female householder with no husband present, and 26.8% were non-families. 21.9% of all households were made up of individuals, and 9.6% had someone living alone who was 65 years of age or older. The average household size was 2.63 and the average family size was 3.08.

In the town, the population was spread out, with 26.0% under the age of 18, 7.1% from 18 to 24, 27.7% from 25 to 44, 24.7% from 45 to 64, and 14.4% who were 65 years of age or older. The median age was 38 years. For every 100 females, there were 97.6 males. For every 100 females age 18 and over, there were 93.1 males.

The median income for a household in the town was $41,438, and the median income for a family was $50,095. Males had a median income of $38,037 versus $25,279 for females. The per capita income for the town was $18,311. About 5.2% of families and 6.8% of the population were below the poverty line, including 7.9% of those under age 18 and 5.0% of those age 65 or over.

== Communities and locations in Newfane ==
- Appleton – A hamlet in the northeast part of Newfane.
- Burt – A hamlet south of Olcott on Route 78, named after Burt van Horn, an early settler in the region.
- Corwin – A hamlet between Newfane and Wrights Corners on Route 78.
- Eighteen Mile Creek – A stream flowing northward through the town to Lake Ontario.
- Hess Road – A location on the east border of the town, east of Newfane.
- Ridgewood – A hamlet southeast of Newfane on Route 104 (Ridge Road).
- Newfane – The hamlet of Newfane is on Route 78, centrally located in the town and on the east bank of Eighteen Mile Creek.
- Olcott – A hamlet with a small boat harbor on Lake Ontario.
- Olcott-Newfane Airport (D80) – A small general aviation airport on the west side of Eighteen Mile Creek and southwest of Olcott.
- Woodland Heights – a lakeside hamlet on Lake Ontario.
- Wrights Corners – A hamlet on the south town line, partly in the Town of Lockport. The community is located by the fork in Routes 78 and 104. It extends to Wicks Road.
