= Burt, New York =

Hamlet in New York, United States

Coordinates: 43°18′59″N 78°42′50″W

Burt is a hamlet in the town of Newfane in Niagara County, New York, United States.
