= Lockport =

Lockport may refer to:

== Places ==
In Canada

- Lockport, Manitoba, an unincorporated community
- Lockport, Newfoundland and Labrador, an abandoned fishing village

In the United States

- Lockport, Illinois, a city
  - Lockport Historic District
- Lockport, Indiana, an unincorporated town
- Lockport, Kentucky in Henry County
- Lockport, Louisiana, a town
- Lockport (city), New York
  - Lockport Industrial District
- Lockport (town), New York, surrounding the city
  - Lockport Mall, a former shopping mall
- Lockport, Ohio, a ghost town
- Platea, Pennsylvania, in Erie County, known as the Borough of Lockport until 1902
- Lockport, an old name for the village Black River, New York
- Lockport Township (disambiguation)

== Other uses ==
- Lockport Cave, New York, a man-made cave
- Lockport formation, a component of the Niagara Escarpment
- Lockport Subdivision, railroad line owned by CSX Transportation in the U.S. state of New York

== See also ==
- Lockport Station (disambiguation)
- South Lockport, New York
- Lockeport, Nova Scotia
