= Cheektowaga Central School District =

School district in New York, United States

Location
- Cheektowaga, New York Erie County United States

District information
- Grades: K-12
- Superintendent: Scott R. Zipp
- Schools: 3

Students and staff
- Athletic conference: Section VI
- District mascot: Chargers

Other information
- Website: cheektowagacentral.org

Cheektowaga Central Free School District is a school district in Cheektowaga, New York, United States. The district operates three schools: Cheektowaga High School, Cheektowaga Middle School, and Union East Elementary School.

== Administration ==
The District offices are located 3600 Union Road in Cheektowaga.

=== Current Administrators ===
- Scott Zipp–Superintendent

== District history ==
The town of Cheektowaga had many multiple districts. In 1956, five districts (Union, Losson, Pine Hill, Alexander, and Cayuga) merged to form the new Cheektowaga Central School District.

=== Former Superintendents ===
Previous assignment and reason for departure denoted in parentheses

- Earl J. Boggan–1956-1969 (Principal - Pine Hill High School, retired, named Coordinator of Secondary Education of D'Youville College)
- Omer Renfrow–1969-1976 (Principal - Thornton Township High School, retired)
- Andrew P. Mulligan–1976-1987 (unknown, retired)
- Leslie B. Lewis–1987-2003 (Principal - Cheektowaga Junior/Senior High School, retired)
- Delia Bonenberger–2003-2010 (Assistant Superintendent - Cheektowaga Central School District, retired)
- Dennis M. Kane–2010-2016 (Assistant Superintendent - Cheektowaga Central School District, retired)
- Mary A. Morris–2016-2021 (Assistant Superintendent - Cheektowaga Central School District, retired)
- Steven L. Wright–2021-2022 (Assistant Superintendent - Cheektowaga Central School District, retired)

== Cheektowaga Central High School ==
Cheektowaga High School
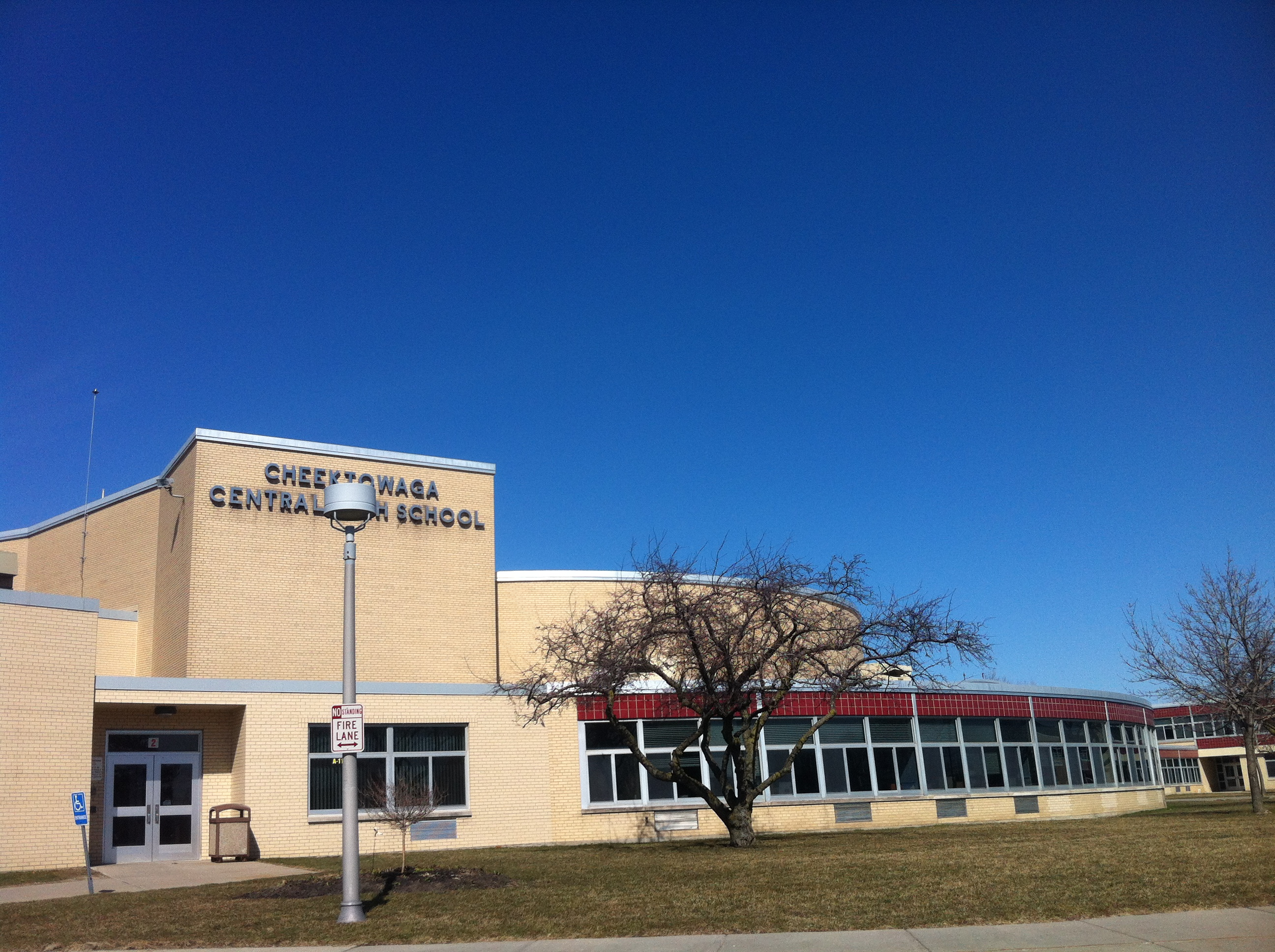

Location
- 3600 Union Road; Cheektowaga, Erie, New York 14225

Information
- Principal: Joshua M. Strzelec
- Assistant Principals: Alexandra Celeste; Micah J. Hanford
- Grades: 9-12
- Yearbook: Centorial
- Website: Cheektowaga High School

Cheektowaga Central High School is located at 3600 Union Road and serves grades 9 through 12. The current principal is Joshua Strzelec.

=== History ===
Cheektowaga Central High School opened on September 7, 1960 and was dedicated on April 23, 1961.

==== Former principals ====
Previous assignment and reason for departure denoted in parentheses

- Charles S. Allgeier–1960-1969 (Vice Principal - Depew High School, retired)
- Bertha K. Dauer–1969-1977 (Vice Principal - Cheektowaga Junior/Senior High School, retired)
- Leslie Lewis–1977-1987 (Vice Principal - Cheektowaga Junior/Senior High School, named Superintendent of Cheektowaga Central School District)
- Robert C. D'Angelo–1987-1989 (Assistant Principal - Royalton-Hartland High School, named Assistant Principal of Pembroke Junior/Senior High School)
- James G. Christmann–1989-1993 (Assistant Principal - Kensington High School, named Principal of Pine Hill Middle School)
- George W. Radka–1993-2000 (Principal - Cheektowaga Middle School, retired)
- Steven L. Wright–2000-2007 (Vice Principal - Cheektowaga Junior/Senior High School, named Director of Pupil Personnel Services for Cheektowaga Central Schools)
- Susan L. Cain–2007-2014 (Assistant Principal - Cheektowaga Central High School, retired)
- Scott Zipp–2014-2021 (Assistant Principal - Cheektowaga High School, named Assistant Superintendent of Cheektowaga Central School District)
- Karin S. Cyganovich–2021-2025 (Physics teacher - Cheektowaga High School, named Director of Learning of Cheektowaga Central School District)

== Cheektowaga Middle School ==
Cheektowaga Middle School
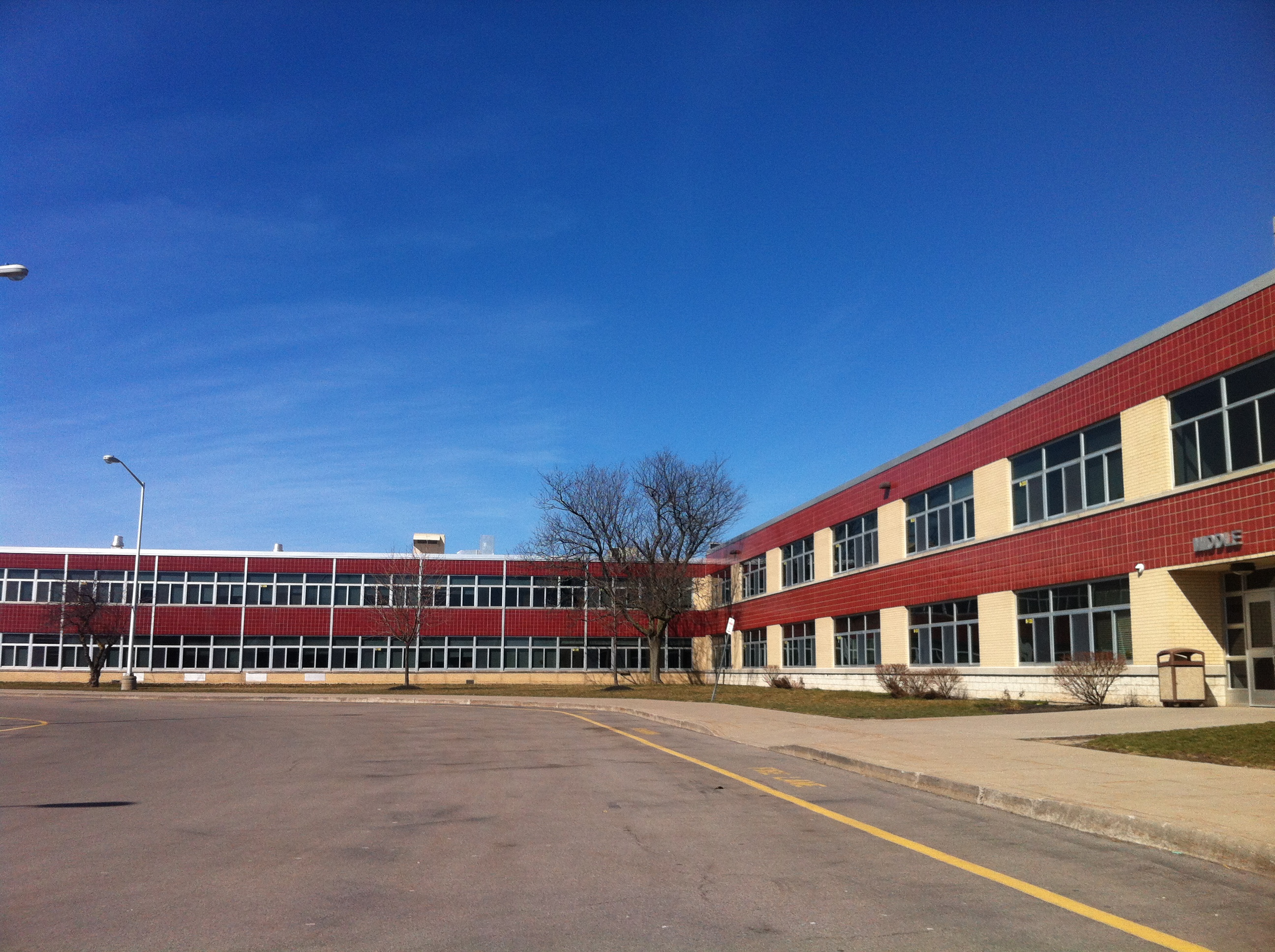

Location
- 3600 Union Road; Cheektowaga, Erie, New York 14225

Information
- Principal: Christopher A. Salinas
- Vice Principal: Katie M. Daniels
- Grades: 5-8
- TOSA/Dean: David C. Ryan
- Website: CCMS

Cheektowaga Central Middle School is located at 3600 Union Road and serves grades 5 through 8. The current principal is Christopher Salinas.

=== Academics ===
Cheektowaga Central Middle School offers core academics and exploratories including Fine Arts and Family/Consumer Sciences, as well as an advisement program called Success Through Academics, Character, and Knowledge (STACK).

=== History ===
Cheektowaga Central Middle School was formed in 1989. Previously, grades 7 and 8 were housed at Cheektowaga High School. From 1993-2003, both the high and middle school shared principals and other staff until the middle school was reborn in 2003. An addition was built onto the east wing of the school to accommodate the new middle school in 2003.

The current Cheektowaga Central Middle School opened on September 3, 2003 and was dedicated on November 20, 2003.

==== Former Principals ====
Previous assignment and reason for departure denoted in parentheses

- George W. Radka–1989-2000 (Vice Principal - Cheektowaga Junior/Senior High School, retired)
- Cheryl M. Buggs–2003-2007 (Assistant Principal - Cheektowaga Middle School, named Director of Human Resources for Cheektowaga Central Schools)
- Brian K. Bridges–2007-2013 (Assistant Principal - Cheektowaga Middle School, named Principal of Union East Elementary School)
- Gretchen A. Sukdolak–2013-2016 (Principal - Union East Elementary School, named Director of Pupil Services of Cheektowaga Central School District)
- Micah J. Hanford–2016-2020 (Assistant Principal - Cheektowaga Middle School, named Assistant Principal of Cheektowaga High School)
- Patrick M. Cullinan–2020-2022 (Assistant Principal - Cheektowaga High School, assigned to Central Office)
- Thomas J. Lyons [interim]–2022

== Union East Elementary School ==
Union East Elementary School
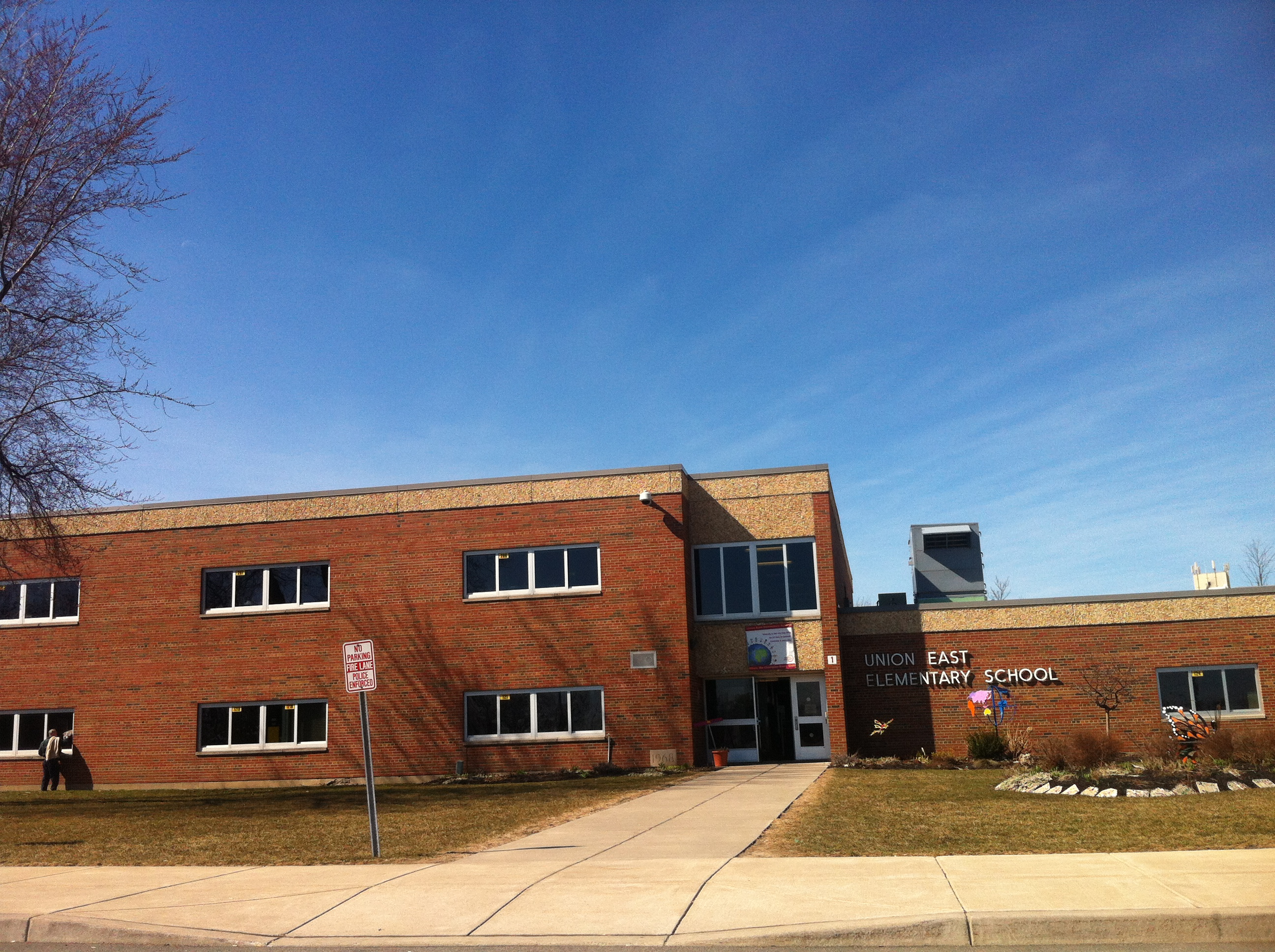

Location
- 3550 Union Road; Cheektowaga, Erie, New York 14225

Information
- Principal: Melissa A. Mitchell
- Asst. Principals: Julia Hamels; Monique Jackson-Smith
- Grades: K-4
- Website: Union East Elementary

Union East Elementary School is located at 3550 Union Road and serves grades K through 4. The current principal is Melissa Mitchell.

=== History ===
Union East was built and opened on September 4, 1968. The school was dedicated on May 4, 1969.

==== Former principals ====
Previous assignment and reason for departure denoted in parentheses

- Ruth P. Peters–1968-1986 (Principal - Alexander Elementary School, retired)
- William E. Koepf–1986-1995 (Principal - Alexander Middle School, retired)
- Alison J. Caputy–1995-2000 (Assistant Principal - Union East Elementary, named Principal of Pine Hill Primary School)
- Kathleen M. Rudewicz–2000-2009 (Principal - Pine Hill Primary School, retired)
- Gretchen Sukdolak–2009-2013 (Assistant Principal - Union East Elementary School, named Principal of Cheektowaga Middle School)
- Brian Bridges–2013-2016 (Principal - Cheektowaga Middle School, placed on leave and named Social Worker at Harvey Austin School)

== Defunct Schools ==
=== Pine Hill Education Center ===
Pine Hill Education Center
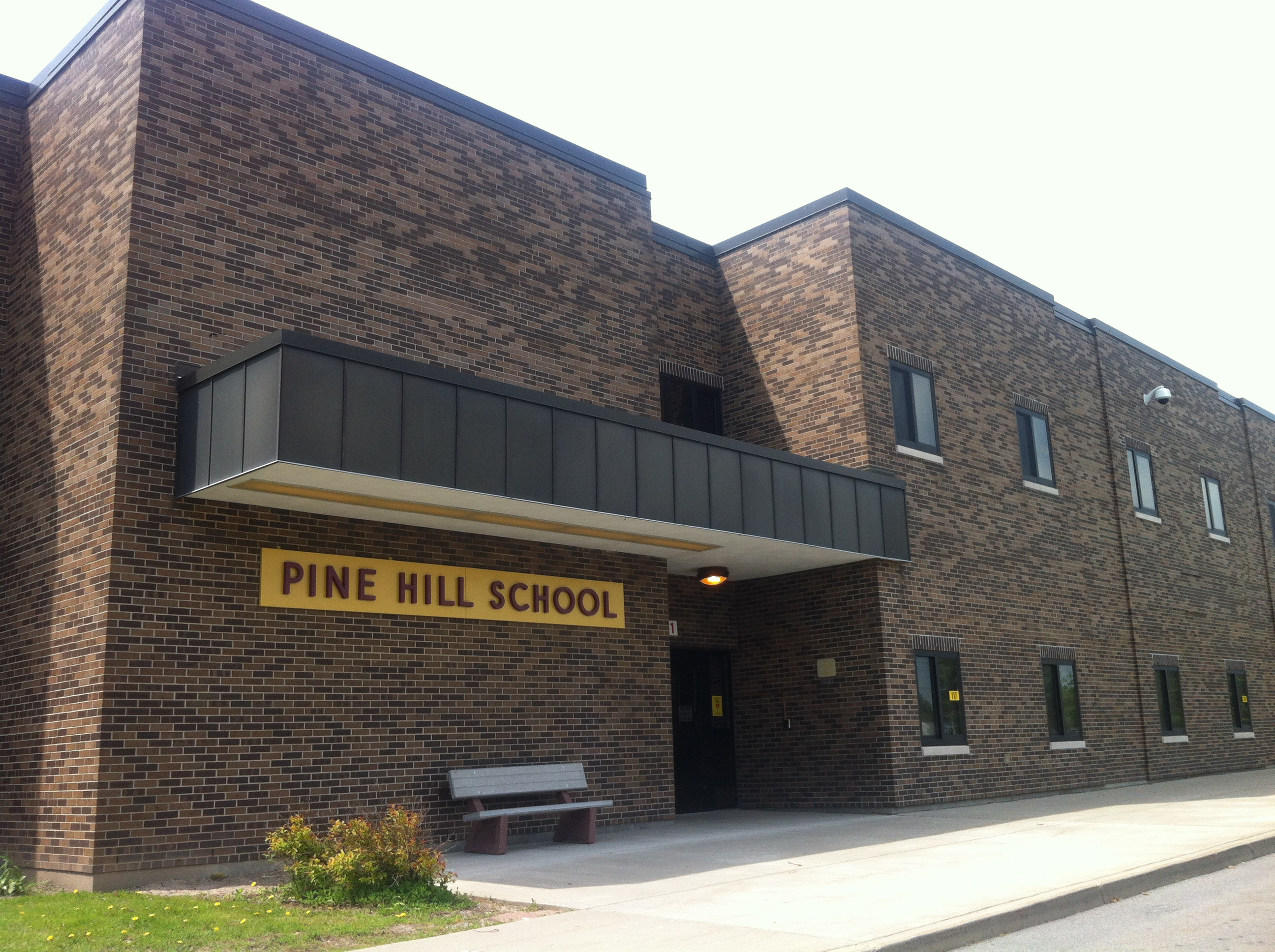

Location
- 1635 East Delavan Avenue; Buffalo, Erie, New York 14215

Information
- Grades: PK-12

Pine Hill Education Center was located at 1635 East Delavan in Buffalo, New York and served grades PK through 12

=== History ===
Pine Hill opened as Pine Hill Elementary School in September 1971. The cornerstone was laid on May 19, 1971 and the school was dedicated on June 1, 1972. The school served elementary Grades K-6 and later a middle school serving grades 5-6. Pine Hill closed as an elementary school in 2011, and was restructured as the district's alternative education program. The alternative program, opened in 2011, served students who were referred from the Cheektowaga Middle and High Schools in need of a smaller, more structured learning environment.

In 2018, the school was closed, and the alternative education program was moved to the high school campus's A-Wing. The building now houses the EDGE Academy from Erie 1 BOCES.

==== Former Principals ====
Previous assignment and reason for departure denoted in parentheses

- Robert J. Schlageter–1960-1986 (Principal - Losson Road School, retired)
- Frank G. Cantie–1986-1993 (4th grade teacher - Union East Elementary School, retired)
- James G. Christmann–1993-1994 (Principal - Cheektowaga High School, named Principal of Royalton-Hartland High School)
- Alison Caputy–1994-1995 (Teacher - Charlotte Cross Elementary School, named Principal of Union East Elementary)
- Kathleen Rudewicz–1995-2000 (Assistant Principal - Union East Elementary, named Principal of Union East Elementary)
- Alison Caputy–2000-2009 (Principal - Union East Elementary, retired)
- Steven Wright–2009-2018 (Director of Pupil Personnel Services - Cheektowaga Central School District, named Chief Technology Officer of Cheektowaga Central School District)
- Patrick Cullinan–2016-2017 (Math teacher - Harriet Ross Tubman School, named Assistant Principal of Union East Elementary School)

== Notable alumni ==
- Ryan Ciminelli (Class of 2004)–PBA bowler
- William J. Hochul Jr. (Class of 1977)–First gentleman of New York State
- Dominick Welch (Class of 2017)–Professional basketball player
