= WLNF =

- Rapids, New York; United States
- Broadcast area: Niagara County
- Frequency: 90.9 MHz
- Branding: WLNF 90.9 FM

Programming
- Format: Variety

Ownership
- Owner: Lockport Community Television

History
- Call sign meaning: Lockport Niagara Falls

Technical information
- Licensing authority: FCC
- Facility ID: 173583
- Class: A
- ERP: 1,800 watts
- HAAT: 28.5 metres (94 ft)
- Transmitter coordinates: 43°05′49″N 78°38′11″W

Links
- Public license information: Public file; LMS
- Webcast: Via LCTV audio feed
- Website: Official Website

WLNF (90.9 FM) is a radio station licensed to serve the community of Rapids, New York. The station is owned by Lockport Community Television, a public, educational and government access service that operates this station, the fifth digital subchannel of low-power television station WBNF-CD and three cable channels. It airs a full-service, gold-based adult contemporary music format.

The station was assigned the WLNF call letters by the Federal Communications Commission on November 27, 2008.
