= New York's 144th State Assembly district =

American legislative district

Assemblymember
Paul Bologna; R–Clarence

New York's 144th State Assembly district is one of the 150 districts in the New York State Assembly. It has been represented by Paul Bologna since 2025, succeeding Michael Norris. In 2024, he announced he would not seek re-election.

== Geography ==
District 144 contains portions of Erie and Niagara counties.

The district overlaps New York's 23rd and 24th congressional districts, as well as the 60th and 62nd districts of the New York State Senate.

=== 2010s ===
District 144 contained portions of Erie, Niagara and Orleans counties.

== Recent election results ==
=== 2026 ===
2026 New York State Assembly election, District 144
Party	Candidate	Votes	%
Republican	Paul Bologna		
Conservative	Paul Bologna		
Total	Paul Bologna (incumbent)		
Democratic	Donna Dye Sholk		
Working Families	Donna Dye Sholk		
Total	Donna Dye Sholk		
Write-in			
Total votes			

=== 2024 ===
Incumbent assemblymember Michael Norris won renomination in the June 25th primary. He, however, ended his campaign after being nominated as a judge for the New York Supreme Court. The Niagara and Erie County Republican Parties nominated Paul Bologna, his chief of staff.

2024 New York State Assembly election, District 144
Party	Candidate	Votes	%
Republican	Paul Bologna	37,526	
Conservative	Paul Bologna	6,824	
Total	Paul Bologna	44,350	61.8
Democratic	Michelle Roman	25,209	
Working Families	Michelle Roman	2,193	
Total	Michelle Roman	27,402	38.2
Write-in		35	0.0
Total votes		71,787	100.0
Republican hold			

=== 2022 ===
2022 New York State Assembly election, District 144
Party	Candidate	Votes	%
Republican	Michael Norris	33,191	
Conservative	Michael Norris	9,628	
Total	Michael Norris (incumbent)	42,819	99.2
Write-in		358	0.8
Total votes		43,177	100.0
Republican hold			

=== 2020 ===
2020 New York State Assembly election, District 144
Party	Candidate	Votes	%
Republican	Michael Norris	40,314	
Conservative	Michael Norris	7,471	
Independence	Michael Norris	5,073	
Libertarian	Michael Norris	1,517	
Total	Michael Norris (incumbent)	54,375	99.3
Write-in		379	0.7
Total votes		54,754	100.0
Republican hold			

=== 2018 ===
2018 New York State Assembly election, District 144
Primary election
Party	Candidate	Votes	%
Reform	Michael Norris (incumbent)	123	99.2
Reform	Joe DiPasquale	1	0.8
Write-in		0	0.0
Total votes		124	100
General election
Republican	Michael Norris	25,482	
Conservative	Michael Norris	5,159	
Independence	Michael Norris	839	
Reform	Michael Norris	208	
Total	Michael Norris (incumbent)	31,688	62.5
Democratic	Joe DiPasquale	17,709	
Working Families	Joe DiPasquale	900	
Women's Equality	Joe DiPasquale	435	
Total	Joe DiPasquale	19,044	37.5
Write-in		14	0.0
Total votes		50,746	100.0
Republican hold			

=== 2016 ===
2016 New York State Assembly election, District 144
Party	Candidate	Votes	%
Republican	Michael Norris	37,747	
Independence	Michael Norris	5,759	
Total	Michael Norris	43,506	99.7
Write-in		112	0.3
Total votes		43,618	100.0
Republican hold			

=== 2014 ===
2014 New York State Assembly election, District 144
Party	Candidate	Votes	%
Republican	Jane Corwin	20,551	
Conservative	Jane Corwin	5,544	
Independence	Jane Corwin	3,366	
Total	Jane Corwin (incumbent)	29,461	99.8
Write-in		60	0.2
Total votes		29,521	100.0
Republican hold			

=== 2012 ===
2012 New York State Assembly election, District 144
Party	Candidate	Votes	%
Republican	Jane Corwin	33,853	
Independence	Jane Corwin	5,323	
Conservative	Jane Corwin	5,274	
Total	Jane Corwin (incumbent)	44,450	99.8
Write-in		105	0.2
Total votes		44,555	100.0
Republican hold			
