= Royalton-Hartland Central School District =

School district in New York, United States

Royalton Hartland School District

Location
- Middleport, NY

District information
- Grades: K-12
- Superintendent: Jill Heck
- Schools: 3

Students and staff
- District mascot: Rams
- Colors: Purple and White

Other information
- Website: www.royhart.org

Royalton Hartland School District (nicknamed "Roy-Hart") is a school district in Middleport, New York, United States and serves the nearby hamlet of Gasport. The superintendent is Jill Heck. The district operates three schools: Royalton-Hartland High School, Royalton-Hartland Middle School, and Royalton-Hartland Elementary School.

Most of the district is in Niagara County. In regards to towns, it includes most of Royalton, southern portions of Hartland, and a small portion of Lockport. The district also includes Middleport village, and Gasport census-designated place. A portion of the district extends to Alabama town, Genesee County; and Shelby town, Orleans County.

== Administration ==
The district offices are located at 54 State Street. The current superintendent is Jill Heck.

=== Selected former superintendents ===
- William Bassett
- Gary Brader–1988-1992 (unknown, named Superintendent of Cheektowaga-Maryvale Union Free School District))
- Larry Shanley–1992-1993 (Assistant Superintendent - Royalton-Hartland Central School District, retired))
- Peter Kachris [interim]–1993-1994
- Judith P. Staples–1994-1997 (Assistant Superintendent - Depew Union Free School District, named Superintendent of Barker Central School District)
- Paul J. Bona–1997-2009 (Superintendent - Elizabethtown Lewis Central School District, retired)
- Kevin M. MacDonald–2009-2013 (Assistant Superintendent - Orleans/Niagara BOCES, named Superintendent of Genesee Valley Educational Partnership)
- Roger Klatt–2013-2018 (Superintendent - Barker Central School District, retired)
- Henry Stopinski

== Royalton-Hartland High School ==
Royalton-Hartland High School

Location
- 54 State Street; Middleport, Niagara, New York 14105

Information
- Principal: Gary R. Bell
- Grades: 9-12
- Website: Royalton-Hartland High School

Royalton Hartland High School is located at 54 State Street and serves grades 9 through 12. The current principal isGary Bell.

=== History ===
Until 2005, Royalton Hartland High School housed grades 7-12 and was known as Royalton-Hartland Junior/Senior High School. In 2005, the school district was reconsolidated, and the High School was reconfigured to house solely grades 9-12.

==== Selected former principals ====
Previous assignment and previous assignment denoted in parentheses

- Edward Sanderson
- John H. George
- Thomas Abraham–?-1993 (unknown, named Superintendent of Hartford Central Schools)
- Robert Farkas [interim]–1993-1994
- James Christmann–1994-1995 (Principal - Pine Hill Middle School, named Principal of Pioneer High School)
- Dennis A. Priore–1995-1998 (unknown, named Principal of Cleveland Hill Middle School)
- Kevin MacDonald–1998-2001 (Assistant Principal - Lewiston-Porter High School, named Director of Alternative Education at Erie 1 BOCES)
- Gary McNunn [interim]–2001-2002
- Kevin L. Shanley–2002-2009 (Principal - Gasport Elementary School, named Superintendent of Cuba-Rushford Central School District)
- Michael J. Murray–2009-2011 (Principal - Mount Morris Elementary School, named director of athletics of Mount Morris Central School District)

== Royalton Hartland Middle School ==
Royalton-Hartland Middle School

Location
- 78 State Street; Middleport, Niagara, New York 14105

Information
- Type: Public, Coeducational
- Principal: Danielle E. Alterio
- Grades: 5-8
- Website: Royalton Hartland Middle School

Royalton Hartland Middle School (formerly Middleport Elementary School) is located at 78 State Street in Middleport and serves grades 5 through 8. The current principal is Danielle Alterio.

=== History ===
Until 2005, Royalton Hartland Middle School housed grades K-6 and was known as Middleport Elementary School. The school was reconfigured in 2005, and began housing grades 5-8.

== Royalton-Hartland Elementary School ==
Royalton-Hartland Elementary

Location
- 4500 Orchard Place; Gasport, Niagara, New York 14067

Information
- Type: Public, Coeducational
- Principal: Donna VanSlyke
- Grades: K-4
- Website: Royalton Hartland Elementary

Royalton Hartland Elementary School is located at 4500 Orchard Place in Gasport and serves grades K through 4. The current principal is Dan Mault

=== History ===
Royalton Hartland Elementary was known as Gasport Elementary School and housed Grades K-6 until 2005. The school was reconfigured to house Grades K-4 and became the district's sole elementary school in 2005.
