= Lockport High School =

Location
- 250 Lincoln Avenue; Lockport, New York; USA; 43.1529°N 78.6877°W

Information
- Type: Public Secondary
- Motto: "We are Lions. We all belong."
- School district: Lockport City School District
- Staff: 107.23 (FTE)
- Faculty: 131
- Grades: 9-12
- Enrollment: 1,353 (2023-2024)
- Student to teacher ratio: 12.62
- Campus: City
- Color
- Mascot: Lion
- Website: https://www.lockportschools.org/o/lhs

Lockport City High School (also LHS) is a comprehensive public high school located on Lincoln Avenue in Lockport, New York, United States, east of the city of Niagara Falls in the Lockport City School District, serving ninth to twelfth grade students. It is the only high school within the district, and is the successor to Aaron Mossell Junior High School. The school is governed under the authority of the New York State Education Department, whose standardized examinations are designed and administered by the Board of Regents of the University of the State of New York. The high school was established in 1954.

== Campus ==
Lockport High School is a 9th through 12th grade institution that includes one building on one campus. The main building, named Lockport High School (LHS), houses grades 9 through 12. Lockport High School went through a remodeling state through the years of 2009-2012, it now has a brand-new modern style. The building sits on a corner plot of land on Lincoln Avenue and Locust Street. The campus has also one of each baseball, softball, lacrosse/soccer, and 4 tennis courts.

=== Administration ===
The Lockport High School complex is currently (2025 - 26 School Year) administered by a main principal and three assistant principals:

- Mrs. Dawn Wylke, Principal
- Mrs. Amanda Schaus, Assistant Principal
- Mr. Anthony Molinaro, Assistant Principal
- Mr. Michael Pickreign, Assistant Principal

== Academics ==
=== Curriculum ===
Lockport High School offers more than 150 different courses in English, Social Studies, Mathematics, Science, Languages Other Than English, Art, Music, Family & Consumer Science, Health, Business, Technology, and Physical Education. Technical career courses are available through Orleans-Niagara Board of Cooperative Education (BOCES). The school focuses on graduating all students with the minimum of a Regents Diploma, but some may also graduate with a less advanced local diploma. The Regents Diploma with Advanced Designation may be achieved with extended studies in a foreign language.

Though the curriculum is developed and sanctioned by the New York State Department of Education, and classes are developed to prepare students to achieve success on the required Regents Examinations, most core courses offer one or two components that explore more advanced topics. The school not only offers standard level Regents courses (Academic level), but also offers more advanced Advanced Placement (AP), College-credit (College), and Honors (H) courses. The criteria used in placing students in the instructional levels are classroom performance, teacher and counselor recommendations, standardized test scores, and individual student preferences. Advanced students may begin earning high school credits in middle school through an accelerated program in mathematics and/ or foreign language.

The school uses a 100 grade point scale, as opposed to the much more common 4.0 scale. The rank in class is established by placing students in descending order from highest to lowest according to their weighted grade point average. The weighted grade point average is calculated with Advanced Placement (AP) courses and College Level courses weighted at 1.1 and Honors Level courses weighted at 1.05.

== Athletics and extracurriculars ==
=== Athletics ===
Lockport High School's 30 varsity athletic teams the American Division of the CNYCL, Section VI of the New York State Public High School Athletic Association (NYSPHSAA) . Lockport has 30 varsity teams and over 40 other teams that provide a range of team and individual sports. A wide variety of teams claim CNYCL and Section IV championships every year, and the vast majority of athletes are honored with NYS Scholar Athlete Awards. The school has won state titles in multiple individual and team sports including boys and girls cross country, golf, tennis, soccer, swimming, track, wrestling, and football. Many teams also have modified, freshman and junior varsity components. The varsity teams include:

Lockport Varsity Sports Teams
Season:	Girls:	Boys:
Fall	Cheerleading, Cross Country, Soccer, Swimming, Tennis, Volleyball	Cross Country, Football, Golf, Soccer, Volleyball
Winter	Basketball, Bowling, Cheerleading, Indoor Track	Basketball, Bowling, Cheerleading, Ice Hockey, Indoor Track, Swimming, Wrestling
Spring	Flag Football, Lacrosse, Softball, Track	Baseball, Lacrosse, Tennis, Track

All varsity teams practice and compete on the high school campus, with a few exceptions. The hockey team practices and competes at the Cornerstone CFCU Arena in Lockport, New York. Also, the indoor track teams compete at various colleges and venues.

==== Stadium ====
Lockport High School currently competes at Max D. Lederer field at the Emmett Belknap Middle School at 491 High Street in Lockport, New York. Lockport's Football and Track and Field teams compete here. Lockport's Lacrosse and Soccer teams compete on the fields behind Lockport High School.

== Notable alumni ==
- Kim Alexis - Model and actress
- David Fluellen - NFL running back who currently plays for the Titans
- William G. Gregory - American retired NASA astronaut and United States Air Force lieutenant colonel
- Warren Hull - Actor, radio and television personality
- William E. Miller - U.S. Congressman
- Michael Norris - Former assembly member in the 144th District of the New York State assembly.
- Chris Sacca - Billionaire investor in Twitter, Uber, Instagram, Kickstarter and a guest shark on Shark Tank
- Daren Stone - NFL linebacker
