= Michael Norris (politician) =

American politician (born 1976)

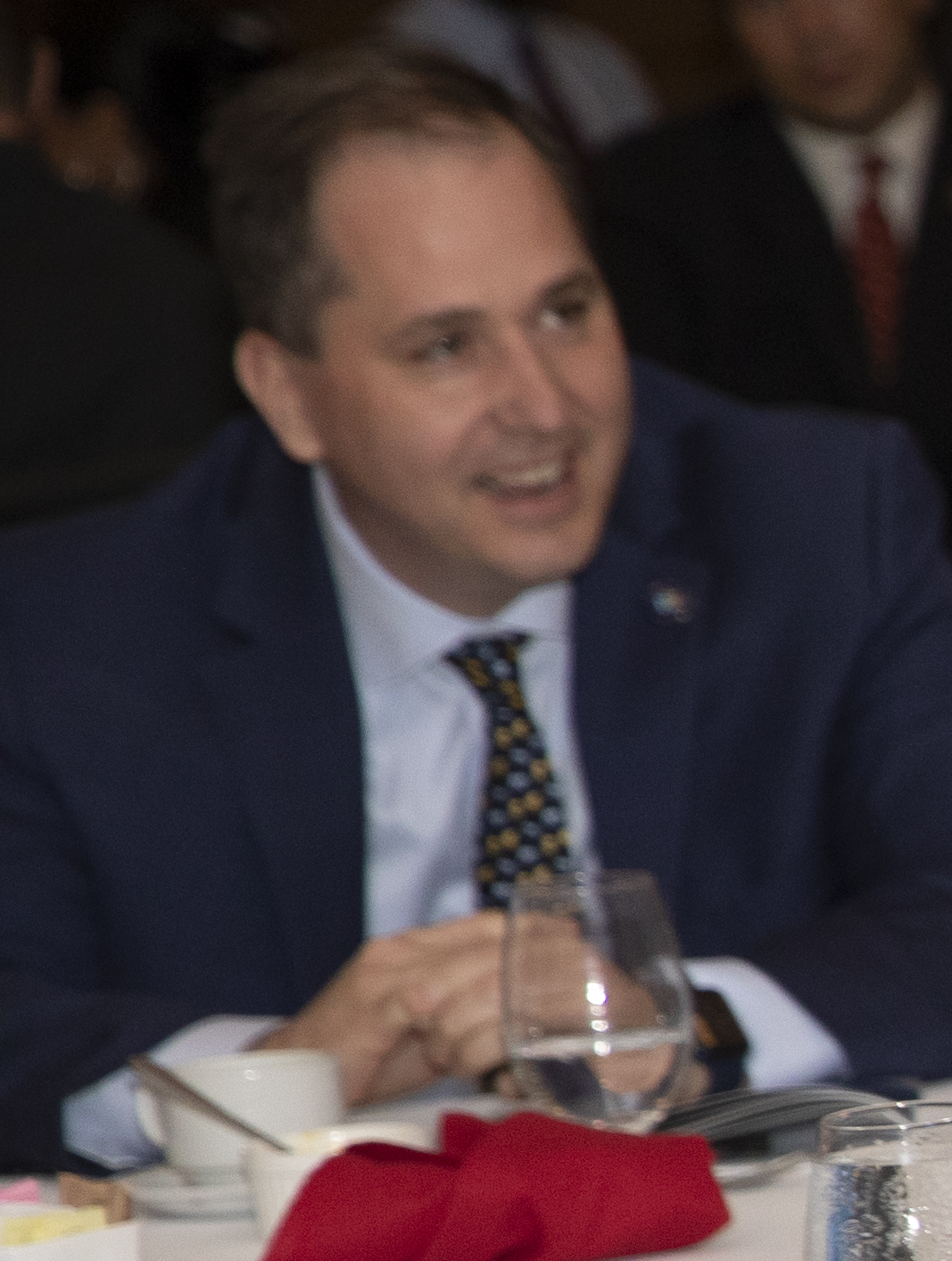

Justice of the New York State Supreme Court from the 8th Judicial district
- Incumbent
- Assumed office January 1, 2025

Member of the New York State Assembly from the 144th district
- In office January 1, 2017 – December 31, 2024
- Preceded by: Jane Corwin
- Succeeded by: Paul Bologna

Chair of the Niagara County, New York Republican Party
- In office November 2009 – April 2013
- Preceded by: Henry Wojtaszek
- Succeeded by: Scott P. Kiedrowski

Republican Commissioner of the Niagara County, New York Board of Elections
- In office 1998–2002
- Preceded by: Lucille L. Britt
- Succeeded by: Scott P. Kiedrowski

Personal details
- Born: April 12, 1976 (age 50)
- Party: Republican
- Education: Niagara University (B.A.); Albany Law School (J.D.)
- Website: Official website

Michael J. Norris (born April 12, 1976) is an American politician. He was the Assembly member for the 144th District of the New York State Assembly from 2017 to 2024 as a Republican. The district includes portions of Erie and Niagara counties in Western New York.

== Life and career ==
Norris was born and raised in Lockport, New York and attended Lockport High School. He is a graduate of Niagara University and Albany Law School. He was admitted to the New York State Bar in 2006. As an attorney, Norris focused on real estate, contracts and estate planning. He has served as the attorney for numerous towns in Niagara County, as well as a town prosecutor.

Norris also worked for the New York State Senate and Assembly, served as a Niagara County Election Commissioner and interned in the City of Lockport Mayor's Office.

== New York State Assembly ==
In 2016, Assemblywoman Jane Corwin announced that she would not seek re-election after four terms. The 144th district, a reliably Republican district, had its three counties, Erie, Niagara and Orleans choosing Norris to replace her through their county Republican organizations. He was unopposed for the Republican nomination, as well as for the general election.

Norris was elected four times to two-year terms and assumed office on January 1, 2017. Norris served as Chairman of the Minority Conference, the Ranking Minority Member of the Election Law and Transportation Committees and also a member of the Rules, Ways and Means, Judiciary, Aging, Cities, Health, Higher Education and Tourism, Parks, Arts and Sports Development Committees over various periods during his Assembly tenure.

In 2024, Norris announced on social media that he would not be seeking re-election to the New York State Assembly. He instead would be pursuing a seat for the New York State Supreme Court. He was endorsed on the Republican, Democratic, and Conservative lines, and was elected to become a Justice for the Eighth District Court.

His term ended on December 31, 2024. He was succeeded by his former Chief of Staff, Paul Bologna.

Political offices
Preceded by Jane Corwin	New York Assembly, 144th District; 2017–2024	Succeeded by Paul Bologna
