= Shawn Regent =

American football player (born 1963)

No. 62
- Position: Center

Personal information
- Born: April 14, 1963 (age 63); Buffalo, New York, U.S.
- Listed height: 6 ft 5 in (1.96 m)
- Listed weight: 280 lb (127 kg)

Career information
- High school: Cheektowaga (Cheektowaga, New York)
- College: Boston College
- NFL draft: 1986: undrafted

Career history
- Green Bay Packers (1986)*; Los Angeles Raiders (1987)
- * Offseason or practice squad member only

Career NFL statistics
- Games played: 3
- Games started: 3
- Stats at Pro Football Reference

Shawn Michael Regent (born April 14, 1963) is an American former professional football player who was a center for the Los Angeles Raiders of the National Football League (NFL). He played college football for the Boston College Eagles.
