= Mike Cole (politician) =

American politician

Michael W. Cole

Member of the New York State Assembly from the 142nd district
- In office May 2006 – December 2008
- Preceded by: Sandra Lee Wirth
- Succeeded by: Jane L. Corwin

Personal details
- Born: 1971 or 1972 (age 54–55)
- Party: Republican
- Spouse: Lori (Kolodziej) Cole
- Children: Emily, Allison
- Education: SUNY Brockport; University at Buffalo Law School
- Profession: Lawyer, Politician

Michael W. Cole (born 1971/1972) was a Republican member of the New York State Assembly representing the 142nd Assembly District, covering portions of Erie and Niagara Counties, from 2006 to 2008. He served on the Assembly Committees for Tourism, Arts and Sports Development, Higher Education, Local Governments, and Government Operations. He was also the ranking member of the Ethics and Guidance Committee. He is an attorney in Alden, New York, where he lives with his family.

== Early life ==
Cole was raised in Alden, New York; and has lived his entire life in Erie County, New York.

== Education and early career ==
Cole is a graduate of Alden Central High School. He received a Bachelor of Science degree from the State University of New York College at Brockport in 1994, and a Juris Doctor degree from the University at Buffalo Law School. He was admitted to the bar in February 2001.

== Political career ==
For former Congress Member Jack Quinn, Cole served as General Counsel and Senior Field Representative. He worked with Quinn's constituents in Western New York State each day, as well as businesses and non-profits. Cole's focus was on issues such as crime, seniors, education, youth and families, community development, and agriculture. Cole was also Quinn’s liaison for issues that affected Western New York veterans.

Additionally, Cole was a New York State Senate legislative assistant for the late Senator John B. Daly.

Cole's first elected office was as Alden Town Councilman in 1998, and he later served as the Town Supervisor.

=== As New York State Assembly Member ===
==== Elections ====
Cole was first elected to the Assembly during a special election in May 2006, gaining close to 70 percent of the vote. He was elected to his first full term as an Assemblyman on November 7, 2006, defeating Democratic challenger Laura Monte with nearly 57 percent of the vote.

Cole won a Republican nominating convention for his Assembly District in May 2008, but was defeated in the September 2008 Republican primary election by challenger Jane Corwin.

==== Electoral history ====
- May 2006 Special Election, NYS Assembly, 142nd AD

Michael W. Cole (REP - IND - CON - STR)	...	5,915
Jeffery A. Bono, III (DEM - WOR)	...	2,650

- November 2006 General Election, NYS Assembly, 142nd AD

Michael W. Cole (REP - IND - CON - STR)	...	25,035
Laura Monte (DEM - WOR)	...	19,917

- September 2008 Republican Primary Election, NYS Assembly, 142nd AD

Jane L. Corwin	...	3,951
Michael W. Cole	...	3,063
Leonard A. Roberto	...	1,481
Jeffrey A. Bono, III	...	255

==== Assembly censure ====
In 2007, Cole was formally censured by New York State Assembly Speaker Sheldon Silver. He admitted to drinking excessively with a student intern at a hockey party in Albany that was hosted by former Assemblyman Sam Hoyt, walked her home, and then spent the night in the woman's apartment with her. These actions were direct violations of the Assembly policy against fraternization with student interns.

Cole was quoted in an April 30, 2007 New York Times article by Danny Hakim regarding the incident, stating:

I ended up spending the night on her floor. As wrong as it sounds now, at the time I didn't think it was such a bad decision to sleep there, being that I was incapable of driving. But it was. I should have taken a cab home...At no point in time did anything inappropriate occur, nor has anything been alleged.

Additionally, Cole was removed as the ranking Republican on the Alcoholism and Drug Abuse Committee, was barred from the Assembly Intern Program, and lost the rights and privileges otherwise due to him per his seniority.

== Post-political career ==
Cole maintains a private law practice in Alden.

== Personal life ==
Cole resides in Alden with his wife Lori (née Kolodziej). They have two daughters Emily and Allison; and attend St. John’s Roman Catholic Church in Alden. Cole is the son of Wayne and Dorothy Cole, and has two brothers, Daniel and Dennis.

== See also ==
- List of New York State Legislature members expelled or censured

Preceded by Sandra Lee Wirth	New York State Assembly, 142nd District; 2006–2008	Succeeded by Jane Corwin
