= Lockport Station =

Lockport Station may refer to:

- Lockport station (Illinois), a station on Metra's Heritage Corridor in Lockport, Illinois
- Union Station (Lockport, New York), a historic train station located at Lockport in Niagara County, New York
- Lockport Air Force Station, a closed US Air Force radar station near Shawnee, New York

== See also ==
- Lockport (disambiguation)
