= Dominick Welch =

American basketball player and rapper (born 1998)

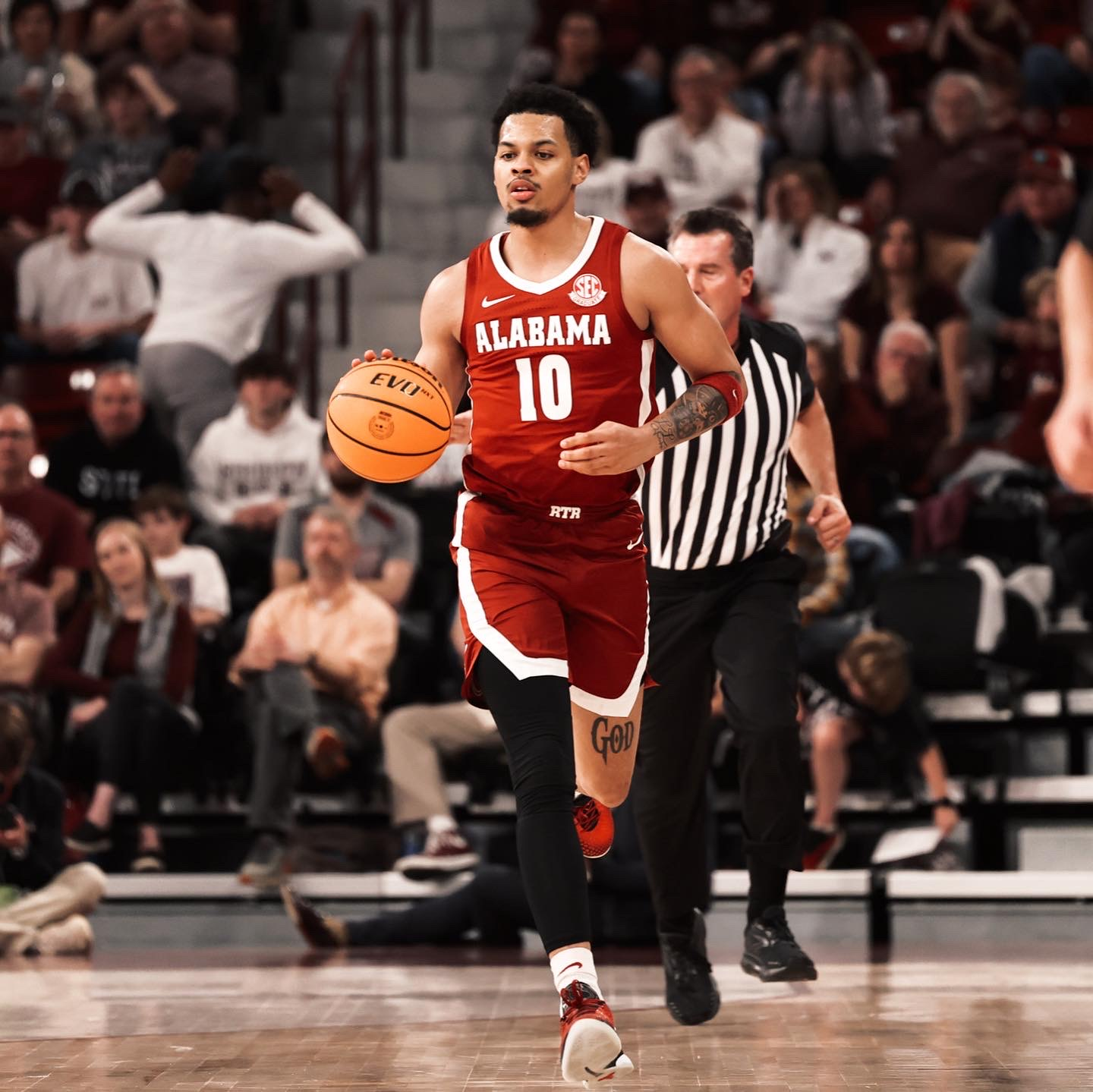
- Welch in 2023

No. 8 – KW Titans
- Position: Shooting guard
- League: BSL

Personal information
- Born: August 27, 1998 (age 27) Buffalo, New York, US
- Listed height: 6 ft 5 in (1.96 m)

Career information
- High school: Cheektowaga Central (2013–2017); SPIRE Institute (2017–2018)
- College: St. Bonaventure (2018–2022); Alabama (2022–2023)
- NBA draft: 2023: undrafted
- Playing career: 2023–present

Career history
- 2023: UBSC Graz
- 2024: Buffalo eXtreme
- 2024: Montréal Toundra
- 2024–2025: KW Titans
- 2025: Team FOG Næstved
- 2026: Windsor Express
- 2026–present: KW Titans

Career highlights
- NIT All-Tournament Team (2022); WNY Player of the Year (2017)

Dominick Welch (born August 27, 1998) is an American professional basketball player who plays for the KW Titans of Basketball Super League. He played college basketball for St. Bonaventure University and later the University of Alabama.

Welch is also a rapper who writes and records music as Domo D.

== History ==
=== High school career ===
Dominick Welch was born in Buffalo, New York to Brandon and Angelo Welch.

Welch was promoted to the varsity team at Cheektowaga Central High School in eighth grade, leading them to their first-ever Section VI championship. Following his senior campaign in 2017, he was named Buffalo News Player of the Year. He set the all-time record for scoring in Western New York, accumulating 2,376 points in his high school career.

Welch spent a year at SPIRE Institute in Geneva, Ohio, leading his prep school team to a 24–8 record. After a run in the national playoffs, he was named Power-5 Prep Conference Player of the Year.

=== Collegiate career ===
Welch committed to St. Bonaventure University in April 2018. He played in 110 games over four seasons, and was named team captain. In his senior season, he was awarded 2022 NIT All-Tournament honors after leading his team to the semifinals.

After graduating from St. Bonaventure with a degree in video production, Welch entered the transfer portal and was signed by the University of Alabama as a graduate student in May 2022. Following the 2022 Buffalo shooting, Welch insisted on changing his jersey number from #1 to #10 in honor of the ten victims who lost their lives.

His 2022–23 season with Alabama was plagued by injuries, but he saw action in 20 games.

=== Professional career ===
Welch went undrafted in the 2023 NBA draft, and started his professional career by signing with UBSC Graz in August 2023.

He tried out for the Memphis Hustle of the NBA G League in October 2023, but was waived.

Welch was signed by the Buffalo eXtreme of the American Basketball Association (ABA) in January 2024, averaging 30.3 points in his three games with the team.

He was signed by the Montréal Toundra of the Basketball Super League (BSL) in February 2024, averaging 14.1 points per game.

Welch was signed by the KW Titans of the Basketball Super League (BSL) in October 2024.

He played thirteen games for Team FOG Næstved of Basketligaen before being released by the team in December 2025.

Welch signed for the Windsor Express of the Basketball Super League (BSL), where he played two games before being released in March 2026.

He was signed by the KW Titans of the Basketball Super League (BSL) in March 2026.

== Personal life ==
Welch has written and recorded music under the alias of Domo D since 2019.
