= Paul Bologna =

New York politician

Member of the New York State Assembly from the 144th district
- Incumbent
- Assumed office January 1, 2025
- Preceded by: Michael Norris

Personal details
- Party: Republican
- Education: Canisius University
- Website: Official website

Paul Bologna is an American politician who is a member of the New York State Assembly for the 144th district, which comprises Erie and Niagara counties.

He was chief of staff to his predecessor, Assemblyman Michael Norris. He worked for Norris as a legislative assistant starting in 2009, then became his chief of staff in 2011. Norris decided to run for New York Supreme Court in 2024.

Bologna was elected in the 2024 election, running as the Republican and Conservative candidate against former (2019–2023) Lockport mayor Michelle Roman, the Democratic and Working Families Party candidate. He describes his priorities as public safety, affordability, local control of energy infrastructure projects, and the "ongoing migrant crisis". He supports repealing the Humane Alternatives to Long-Term Solitary Confinement (HALT) Act.
