= David Fluellen =

American football player (born 1992)

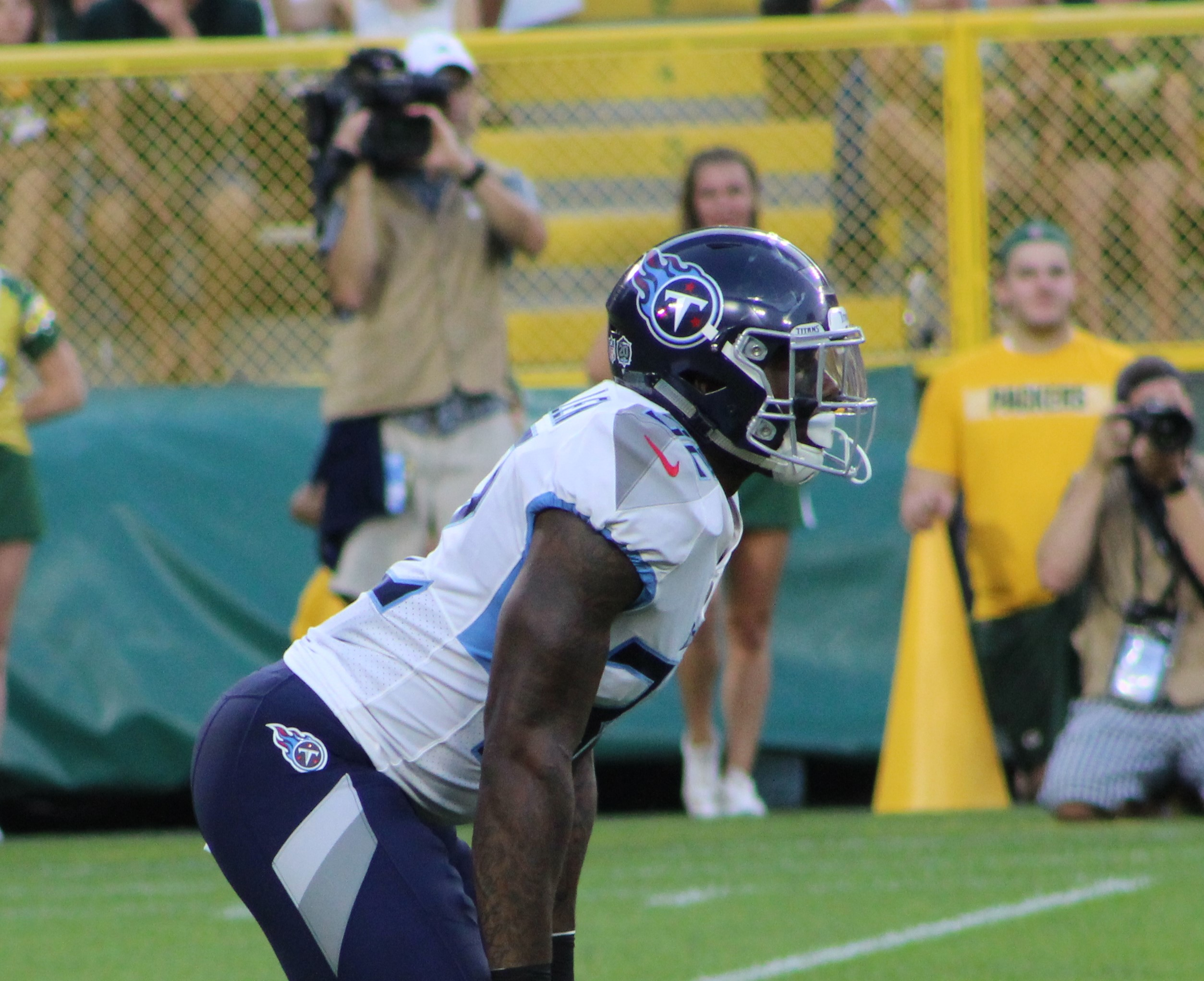
- Fluellen with the Tennessee Titans in 2018

No. 32
- Position: Running back

Personal information
- Born: January 29, 1992 (age 34); Lockport, New York, U.S.
- Listed height: 5 ft 11 in (1.80 m)
- Listed weight: 224 lb (102 kg)

Career information
- High school: Lockport
- College: Toledo
- NFL draft: 2014: undrafted

Career history
- Philadelphia Eagles (2014)*; Indianapolis Colts (2014)*; Tennessee Titans (2015–2019)
- * Offseason or practice squad member only

Awards and highlights
- 2× First-team All-MAC (2012, 2013)

Career NFL statistics
- Rushing attempts: 8
- Rushing yards: 37
- Stats at Pro Football Reference

David Augusta Fluellen Jr. (born January 29, 1992) is an American former professional football player who was a running back in the National Football League (NFL). He played college football for the Toledo Rockets and was signed as an undrafted free agent by the Philadelphia Eagles after the 2014 NFL draft.

== Early life ==
Fluellen attended and played high school football at Lockport High School in Lockport, New York.

== College career ==
Fluellen attended and played college football at the University of Toledo. As a freshman in 2010, he had 38 carries for 224 yards and a touchdown. As a sophomore in 2011, Fluellen had 97 carries for 493 yards and four touchdowns to go along with 16 receptions for 155 yards and two touchdowns. As a junior in 2012, he had 259 carries for 1,498 yards and 13 touchdowns to go along with 32 receptions for 246 yards. As a senior in 2013, Fluellen had 167 carries for 1,121 yards and 10 touchdowns to go along with 27 receptions for 222 yards.

=== Collegiate statistics ===
Season	Team	Class	Pos	GP	Rushing				Receiving			
Season	Team	Class	Pos	GP	Att	Yds	Avg	TD	Rec	Yds	Avg	TD
2010	Toledo	FR	RB	9	38	224	5.9	1	5	39	7.8	0
2011	Toledo	SO	RB	13	97	493	5.1	4	16	155	9.7	2
2012	Toledo	JR	RB	12	259	1,498	5.8	13	32	246	7.7	0
2013	Toledo	SR	RB	9	167	1,121	6.7	10	27	222	8.2	0
Career				43	561	3,336	5.9	28	80	662	8.3	2

== Professional career ==
=== Philadelphia Eagles ===
Following the 2014 NFL draft, Fluellen was signed by the Philadelphia Eagles. He was traded to the Indianapolis Colts for placekicker Cody Parkey on August 20, 2014.

=== Indianapolis Colts ===
Fluellen was waived by the Colts on August 30, 2014.

=== Tennessee Titans ===
On July 29, 2015, Fluellen signed with the Tennessee Titans. He was released at the end of roster cuts and was added to the Titans' practice squad where he spent the entire 2015 season.

On September 2, 2016, Fluellen was released by the Titans as part of final roster cuts. The next day, he was signed to the Titans' practice squad. Fluellen was promoted to the active roster on November 7, 2016. He was waived by the Titans on December 12, 2016, and was signed to the practice squad the next day. He signed a reserve/future contract with the Titans on January 2, 2017.

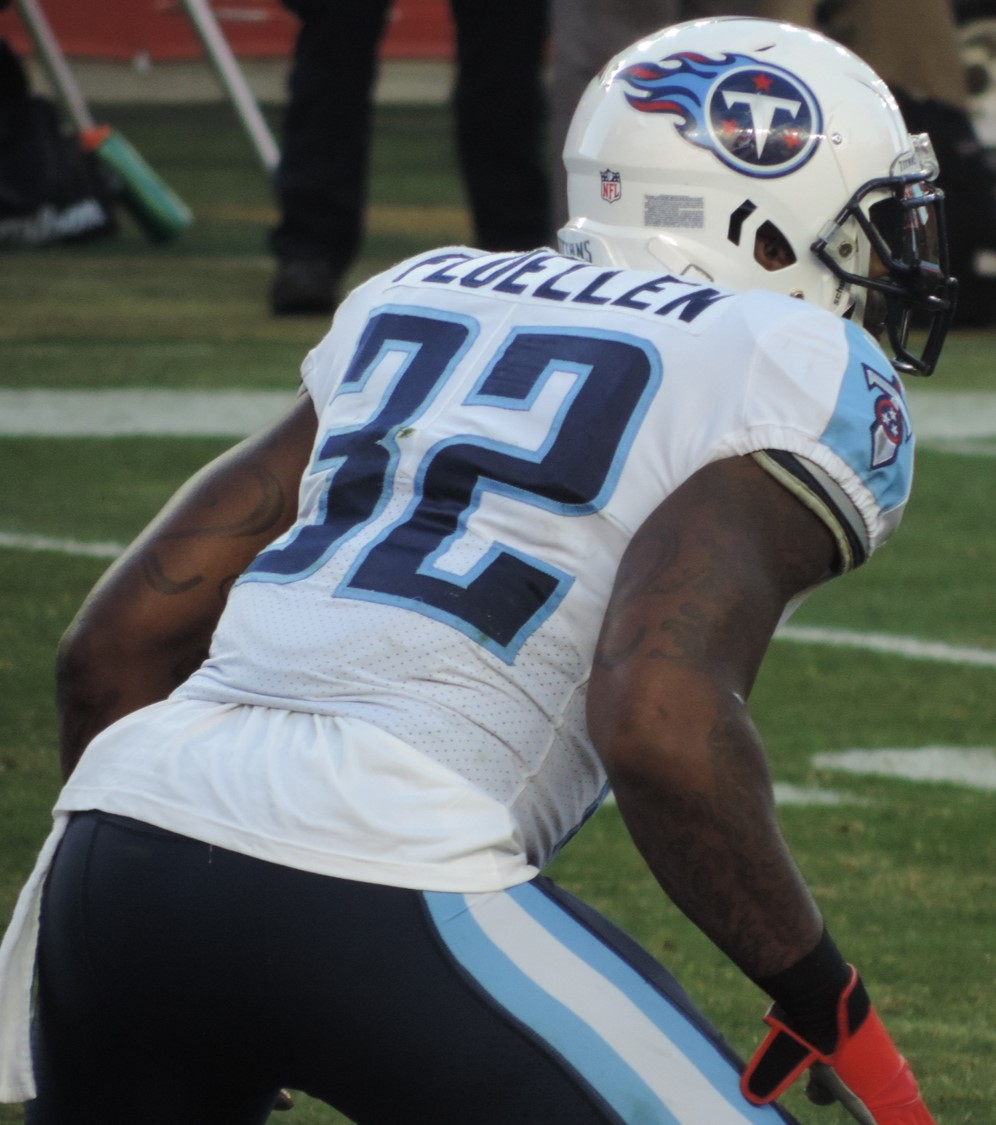
Fluellen in 2017

On September 17, 2017, in Week 2, Fluellen had the first three rushes of his career, which went for 18 yards, in a 37–16 road victory over the Jacksonville Jaguars. Overall, Fluellen finished the 2017 season with four carries for 21 yards. The Titans finished second in the AFC South with a 9–7 record and made the playoffs as a Wild Card team. In the Wild Card Round against the Kansas City Chiefs, Fluellen returned a kickoff for 12 yards right before halftime. The Titans narrowly won on the road by a score of 22–21.

In 2018, Fluellen made his first rush of the season, a two-yarder, in Week 7 during a narrow 20–19 loss against the Los Angeles Chargers. Three weeks later against the New England Patriots, Fluellen rushed three times for 14 yards before exiting the 34–10 victory with a knee injury. He missed the next five games before being placed on injured reserve on December 20, 2018. In seven games, Fluellen had four carries for 16 yards on the season.

On March 11, 2019, Fluellen re-signed with the Titans. He was placed on injured reserve with a knee injury on October 4.

== Personal life ==
Fluellen, a native of Lockport, New York, is married to KSAZ-TV anchor/reporter Desiree Wiley. His brother, Jhamal, was a running back at Syracuse and Maine. Fluellen hosted the first annual David Fluellen Football Camp in June 2018 at his high school alma mater in New York, Lockport High School.
