= Lockport (town), New York =

Lockport, New York Seneca: Jodö:sho:t
- Town
- Town of Lockport
- Flag Logo

- Location in Niagara County and the state of New York
- Coordinates: 43°9′2″N 78°40′37″W
- Country: United States
- State: New York
- County: Niagara

Government
  - Type: Town Council
  - Town Supervisor: Mark C. Crocker (R)
  - Town Council: Members' List: • Tom Keough (R); • Darlene DiCarlo (R); • Pat Dufour (R); • Paul Siejak (R)

Area
  - Total: 44.90 sq mi (116.28 km^{2})
  - Land: 44.84 sq mi (116.14 km^{2})
  - Water: 0.050 sq mi (0.13 km^{2})
- Elevation: 630 ft (192 m)

Population (2010)
  - Total: 20,529
  - Estimate (2016): 20,094
  - Density: 448.1/sq mi (173.01/km^{2})
- Time zone: UTC-5 (Eastern (EST))
  - Summer (DST): UTC-4 (EDT)
- ZIP codes: 14094-14095 (Lockport); 14067 (Gasport)
- Area code: 716
- FIPS code: 36-43093
- GNIS feature ID: 0979165
- Website: elockport.gov

Lockport (Seneca: Jodö:sho:t) is a town in Niagara County, New York, United States. The population was 20,529 at the 2010 census. The name is derived from the series of canal locks on the Erie Canal. The locks lift boats from the lowland of Lake Ontario past the Niagara Escarpment.

The Town of Lockport is in the south-central part of the county and surrounds the City of Lockport.

== History ==
The indigenous Seneca people know the site of Lockport as Jodö:sho:t, literally 'springs there'.

Many early settlers were Quakers and helped make the area a bastion of anti-slavery. The Town of Lockport was established in 1824 from Cambria and Royalton, the same year the canal was completed up to the City of Lockport.

Cold Springs Cemetery was listed on the National Register of Historic Places in 2004.

== Geography ==
According to the United States Census Bureau, the town has a total area of 44.7 square miles (115.8 km^{2}), of which 44.6 square miles (115.6 km^{2}) is land and 0.1 square mile (0.2 km^{2}) (0.18%) is water.

The south border of the town is formed by Tonawanda Creek. The Erie Canal passes through the north part of the town and the City of Lockport. New York State Route 78 marks the west town line of Lockport.

=== Adjacent cities and towns ===
- Town of Cambria – west
- Erie County, Town of Clarence – south
- Town of Pendleton – southwest
- Town of Royalton – east
- Town of Newfane – north
- Town of Hartland – northeast
- City of Lockport – Town surrounds the City of Lockport.

=== Major highways in the Town of Lockport ===
- New York State Route 31 (Saunders Settlement Rd., Chesnut Ridge Rd., Rochester Rd.), east–west highway through the town from the Cambria town line through the City of Lockport to the Royalton town line.
- New York State Route 77 (Chesnut Ridge Rd.), north–south roadway that begins at Chesnut Ridge Rd./Rochester Rd. intersection just outside the City of Lockport and continues through the town for a short distance before entering the Town of Royalton.
- New York State Route 78 (Transit Rd., Lake Ave.), north-south Highway through the town from the Amherst town line through the City of Lockport north to the Newfane town line.
- New York State Route 93 (Dysinger Rd., Robinson Rd., Lockport Bypass, Saunders Settlement Rd., Town Line Rd.), east–west roadway from the Royalton town line, through the town south of the city. The route then travels north on the western outskirts of the City of Lockport by the way of the Lockport Bypass onto Saunders Settlement Rd. (NY 31). The route then runs concurrently with NY 31 until NY 31's intersection with NY 270 where that route has its northern terminus. NY 93 then travels north at that intersection and onward into the Town of Cambria when NY 93 reaches NY 104.

== Demographics ==
Historical population
Census	Pop.	Note	%±
1830	3,823		—
1840	9,125		138.7%
1850	12,323		35.0%
1860	13,523		9.7%
1870	3,032		−77.6%
1880	2,847		−6.1%
1890	2,773		−2.6%
1900	2,585		−6.8%
1910	2,399		−7.2%
1920	1,833		−23.6%
1930	2,720		48.4%
1940	3,160		16.2%
1950	3,945		24.8%
1960	6,492		64.6%
1970	8,177		26.0%
1980	12,942		58.3%
1990	16,596		28.2%
2000	19,655		18.4%
2010	20,529		4.4%
2020	20,563		0.2%
U.S. Decennial Census

As of the census of 2010, there were 20,529 people, 8,293 households, and 5,482 families residing in the town. There were 8,680 housing units. The racial makeup of the town was 91.1% White, 4.8% Black or African American, 0.4% Native American, 1.0% Asian, 0.01% Pacific Islander, 0.6% from other races, and 2.1% from two or more races. Hispanic or Latino people of any race were 2.6% of the population.

(2000 Census) There were 7,537 households, out of which 33.3% had children under the age of 18 living with them, 55.4% were married couples living together, 10.7% had a female householder with no husband present, and 30.3% were non-families. 25.3% of all households were made up of individuals, and 8.3% had someone living alone who was 65 years of age or older. The average household size was 2.52 and the average family size was 3.03.

In the town, the population was spread out, with 25.3% under the age of 18, 8.3% from 18 to 24, 30.4% from 25 to 44, 24.2% from 45 to 64, and 11.9% who were 65 years of age or older. The median age was 37 years. For every 100 females, there were 96.6 males. For every 100 females age 18 and over, there were 94.6 males.

The median income for a household in the town was $45,977, and the median income for a family was $55,414. Males had a median income of $41,166 versus $25,810 for females. The per capita income for the town was $22,194. About 6.5% of families and 7.7% of the population were below the poverty line, including 10.8% of those under age 18 and 2.8% of those age 65 or over.

== Education ==
Most of Lockport Town is in the Lockport City School District. Small portions of the town are in Akron Central School District, Newfane Central School District, Royalton-Hartland Central School District, and Starpoint Central School District.

== Notable natives ==
See City of Lockport

== Communities and locations in the Town of Lockport ==
- Carlisle Gardens (43°10′45″N 78°39′21″W) – A community bordering the east side of Lockport; primarily a residential neighborhood of detached, single family homes built in the 1920s. A typical neighborhood home is about 3 bedrooms, 1-1/2 baths approximately 1,500 sq. ft. Median age ca. 1925. Entry into the neighborhood is from Chestnut Ridge Road or Davison Road onto Windermere Road.
- County Fair Grounds – North of the City of Lockport
- Highland Park – A location north of the City of Lockport, next to the fair grounds
- Nottingham Estates – A location east of the City of Lockport, and north of Route 31
- Rapids – A hamlet on the south border of the town
- Raymond (43°06′25″N 78°40′02″W) – A location northwest of Rapids
- Ridge Lea – A location north of the City of Lockport
- Shooktown (43°09′34″N 78°39′47″W) – A location east of the City of Lockport. The stretch of Akron Road from Lincoln Avenue northwest to the Lockport city line was settled by the Shook family approximately in the 1830s. The name began appearing on local maps in 1927, long after the last Shook owned property there, and was printed as late as 1978.
- South Lockport – A community bordering the south side of the City of Lockport
- Wrights Corners (43°13′21″N 78°40′37″W) – A hamlet on the north town line, located at the junction of NY 78 (Lockport-Olcott Road / Lake Avenue) and NY 104 (Ridge Road), partly in the Town of Newfane
- City of Lockport – Located in the north-central part of the town
- Lockport Mall – A former shopping mall located on Transit Road in South Lockport. As of 2007, the mall was all but vacant, and demolition began in April 2011. Demolition had been mostly completed but was halted on June 9, 2011, after finding a number of federally protected baby seagulls had been nesting the roof. All that remains of the former mall is The Bon-Ton department store building, which was turned into a VA Clinic and storage cubes. A new Walmart supercenter now lies on part of the former footprint of the mall.
