= Boards of Cooperative Educational Services =

Education program in New York State

The Boards of Cooperative Educational Services (BOCES /BOH-seez/) is a program of shared educational services provided to school districts by the New York State Legislature.

== History ==
BOCES owes its origin to a state legislative enactment authorizing the formation of intermediate school districts. Passed in 1948, the act was aimed at enabling small rural school districts to combine their resources to provide services that otherwise would have been uneconomical, inefficient, or unavailable.

BOCES was to be the temporary means by which careful transitions could be made to an intermediate district framework. Though its purposes were similar to those of the proposed intermediate districts, BOCES was conceived and written into the Education Law in its own separate sections (1950 and 1951). Simpler in structure and less autonomous than projected intermediate districts, the BOCES proved itself worthy of being both means and end. Not one intermediate district was ever formed, and cooperative boards proliferated rapidly, especially during the mid-1950s, reaching 82 by 1958.

In 1972 the Intermediate School District Act was repealed. Laws pertaining to BOCES, however, have remained on the books. Thus BOCES has developed from a special-purpose, interim agency into a formally recognized middle or intermediate unit in New York State's public education system. There are currently 37 BOCES incorporating all but 9 of the 697 school districts in New York State.

Moreover, other states have moved toward regional educational configurations like BOCES. At least 30 state legislatures have mandated or passed legislation, as educational service agencies study the idea.

== Membership ==
The total area under supervision of a district superintendent is called a supervisory district.

BOCES membership is not available to the so-called Big Five city school districts: New York City, Buffalo, Rochester, Yonkers, and Syracuse.

Once a district has joined a BOCES, it cannot withdraw and is obligated to pay its annual share of administrative, rental, or facilities expenses. BOCES services are, however, optional. They may be purchased or not purchased as the district's Board of Education (BOE) sees fit. The decision to purchase or not purchase BOCES services is made each school year by district BOEs.

== Operations ==
BOCES services are created when two or more school districts decide they have similar needs that can be met by a shared program. BOCES helps school districts save money by providing opportunities to pool resources and share costs.

Sharing is an economical way for districts to provide programs and services that they might not be able to afford otherwise. It is often more efficient and less costly to operate one central service than it is to have separate programs in each school district. BOCES services are often customized offering districts the flexibility to meet their individual needs.

BOCES is governed just as local districts are governed by a Board of Education, which is made up of representatives from component districts. Board members are responsible for curricular, financial, and other policy decisions, just as they are at the local level.

Members are elected by component school board members. BOCES board members do not need to be local school board members, but they must be eligible voters in component school districts of that BOCES.

Election to BOCES boards occurs at an annual BOCES meeting, which by law is held in April.

The duties and powers of BOCES boards, as specified in 1950 of the Education Law of the State of New York, include the following:

- Appointment of a district superintendent, subject to the approval of the Commissioner of Education;
- Provision of cooperative educational services—with the commissioner's approval and on a contract basis—to component school districts;
- Needs assessment and long-range planning for cooperative educational services in the supervisory district;
- Employment of teachers and other support personnel to carry out BOCES programs;
- Preparation of an adjustable budget for the supervisory district program and its administration;
- Administration of payments for and costs of provided educational services;
- Borrowing of money in anticipation of revenue due;
- Entering into contracts with a variety of public agencies as well as non-public schools in order to arrange or provide services under specified conditions;
- Renting, purchasing, or selling of property or facilities under specified conditions;
- Making reports to the commissioner of education as required.

=== District Superintendent ===
A BOCES board appoints its own chief executive officer, contingent upon approval of the commissioner of education. As a BOCES executive, the district superintendent serves local districts and is responsible to the board of education representing the component districts of the BOCES.

The district superintendent also serves as a representative of the commissioner of education, providing educational leadership to local school districts in matters of law, policy, and practice.

Based on these responsibilities, the district superintendent has at least three important roles:

- Educational change agent
- Regional planner and coordinator
- Field representative for the New York State Education Department, a consultative capacity designed to improve two-way communication between state and local levels

== Services ==
=== Structure and procedures for providing services ===
The facilities, professional personnel, and services of a BOCES are available to every local school district within the district superintendent's supervisory district. Because the BOCES board must develop its offerings to fulfill local demands and needs, levels of accountability and flexibility are maintained.

Under New York State Education Law, a BOCES must furnish any educational service that is requested by two or more component districts and approved by the commissioner of education according to need and practicality in a regional context.

By January of each year, the Boards of Education in component school districts specify their potential service needs for the following school year. These needs, developed by the BOCES into annual operating plans, are submitted to the New York State Education Department and the commissioner of education for approval. BOCES boards then notify component districts of the approved services, asking for a firm commitment to participate by May 1 of each year.

The BOCES and the component districts then enter into formal contracts. Specified in each contract are the number and types of services to be furnished by the BOCES, the number of people to be served, and the amount to be paid to the BOCES.

Signed by the BOCES and component board presidents, and then approved by the commissioner, these contracts are effective for one year, after which they may be renewed, changed, or canceled at the component districts' option. Because districts' needs change every year, decisions about BOCES services may also change every year. If the district doesn't need a BOCES service, it doesn't request it and it doesn't pay for it.

Districts may also authorize multi-year service requests from BOCES.

=== Reasons for participation ===
Because BOCES services are shared by two or more school districts, they often cost much less than if districts provided the services on their own. Districts pool their resources and share the savings.

In addition, New York State gives a financial incentive to participate in shared services by offering school districts state aid for BOCES services. Here is how BOCES state aid works:

- Each district's Board of Education selects BOCES services for the current year.
- The following school year, a portion of the cost of BOCES services is returned to the district as BOCES aid.
- The amount returned is based on a formula that takes into account the districts' financial resources.
- Money not spent on a cooperative service is returned to the district at the end of each fiscal year by the BOCES.

=== Funding ===
A BOCES has no taxing authority. Instead, the sources of BOCES funds are primarily taxes levied by its component districts, state aid, and a relatively small amount of federal aid.

These funds support an administrative budget (covering administrative salaries, equipment, and services) and a program budget (covering other BOCES programs and services which districts select from the Service Directory, an annual listing of available services). In addition, BOCES may receive and manage funding from outside sources (e.g., state and federal) to cover special projects.

The component district's share of BOCES administrative, lease and capital costs are based either on the Resident Weighted Average Daily Attendance (RWADA) or on real property valuation.

Program costs are proportional to the amount of use each component district requires.

Through BOCES state aid, component districts receive financial support for their participation in BOCES. The cost charged to a component district for its BOCES participation serves as the basis for the district's BOCES state aid.

=== Programs ===
The programs and services offered by each BOCES may vary somewhat, and are developed based on the needs of a given BOCES' local school districts.

A large percentage of BOCES programs and services are instructional; that is to say, they serve students with classroom programs and services. Examples of instructional programs are vocational-technical programs for high school students, physical, speech and occupational therapy for students with disabilities, and literacy programs for adults.

Often support staff are broken into on-site, related, or itinerant staff positions. Related personnel often support the program and are housed at the on-site location while Itinerant staff provide services to component districts on an individual or case-by-case basis.

The remaining programs are called support services. They are not classroom programs, support services still relate to the education of students, and because they help school districts save money. This frees up resources to better serve students directly. Examples of support services are staff development, central bus maintenance, central business offices, and Regional Information Centers.

An example of programs that BOCES might offer are Academics Support, Auto Body Repair, Auto Technology, Aviation, Aviation Mechanical Technician, Building Maintenance, Business Computer Technology, Carpentry, Computer Repair and Networking, Cosmetology, Criminal Justice, Culinary Arts, Early Childhood Education, Electrical Wiring Technology, Forestry & Conservation, Gas/Diesel Mechanics, Life Skills, Medical Careers, New Vision Health, New Visions: Law & Government, Nursing Assistant, Practical Nursing, Small Animal Care, Welding, and Visual Communications.

== See also ==
- List of BOCES
- Lists of school districts in New York
