= Starpoint Central School District =

School district in New York, United States

Location
- 4363 Mapleton Road; Lockport, New York 14094 United States

District information
- Type: Public
- Motto: Empowering students to reach their maximum potential
- Grades: Pre-K–12
- Superintendent: Sean M. Croft
- Schools: Fricano Primary School (K–2); Douglas J. Regan Intermediate School (3–5); Starpoint Middle School (6–8); Starpoint High School (9–12)
- Budget: $49,400,852 (2015–16)

Other information
- Website: starpointcsd.org

Starpoint Central District is a public schooling system consisting of elementary, intermediate, middle, and high school institutions. The district also offers Universal Pre-Kindergarten through funding from the New York State Education Department. It is located in Pendleton, New York. The district mascot is the Spartan, and the school colors are garnet and gray. Boys sports include hockey, golf, football, cross country, indoor/outdoor track and field, basketball, lacrosse, baseball, tennis, and swimming. Girls include basketball, cheerleading, cross country, field hockey, soccer, softball, swimming and diving, tennis, indoor/outdoor track and field, and volleyball.

In 2017 Starpoint CSD was ranked 6th out of 98 school districts according to Business First. They also received a Five Star Science Award for exceptional performance in ELA, Math, Science, and Social Studies across grades K-12 in 2013.

The district includes sections of the following towns: almost all of Pendleton, most of Cambria, and sections of Lockport and Wheatfield. It includes the following census-designated places: all of Rapids, most of Sanborn, and a portion of South Lockport.
