= Lockport Township =

Lockport Township may refer to the following places in the United States:

- Lockport Township, Will County, Illinois
- Lockport Township, Haskell County, Kansas
- Lockport Township, St. Joseph County, Michigan

== See also ==
- Lockport (disambiguation)
