= Jane Corwin =

American politician and businesswoman (born 1964)

Commissioner at International Joint Commission
- United States Section Chair
- Assumed office May 16, 2019 Serving with Rob Sisson and Lance Yohe
- Appointed by: Donald Trump

Member of the New York State Assembly from the 144th district
- In office January 1, 2009 – December 31, 2016
- Preceded by: Mike Cole
- Succeeded by: Michael Norris

Personal details
- Born: Jane Louise Lewis; February 29, 1964 (age 62) Tonawanda, New York
- Party: Republican
- Spouse: Philip M. Corwin (m. 1990)
- Children: 3
- Education: SUNY Albany (B.A.); Pace University (M.B.A.)
- Profession: Businessperson, politician
- Assets: $58–$158 million
- Website: Official campaign website

Jane Louise Corwin (née Lewis) born February 29, 1964) is an American politician and businesswoman who currently serves a Commissioner of the International Joint Commission for United States and Canada. She previously served as a Republican Party member of the New York State Assembly from 2009 to 2016. She represented the 144th Assembly District which covers parts of Erie and Niagara counties. Corwin was also the Republican Party nominee in the special election held on May 24, 2011, to fill Western New York's 26th district seat in the U.S. House of Representatives previously held by Republican Chris Lee. She faced three other candidates in the election, losing to Democrat Kathy Hochul 47 percent to 42 percent.

Before entering politics, Corwin was on the board of directors of the family business, and worked at a financial firm while earning her master's degree in business administration.

In 2019, she was confirmed by the Senate as a Commissioner of the International Joint Commission for United States and Canada.

== Early life and education and business career ==
Corwin has said she spent 36 years working in the private sector, beginning her business career at age eight by delivering phone books for The Talking Phone Book, the family business that had been founded by her father, Wilbur Lewis, a former salesman. During her teen years, she proof-read the company's publications, and while in college, she was vice president of marketing. Corwin has stressed she did not grow up wealthy, noting that in the 1980s, her family almost lost their home.

She began college at the private Ithaca College and had to transfer to the State University of New York at Albany because of cost concerns. She earned a B.A. degree in psychology from SUNY in 1985, and then attended Pace University earning an M.B.A. in finance in 1990.

She worked on Wall Street from 1987 to 1990 as a research director for Henry Ansbacher, Inc., a British financial firm that helped large media conglomerates acquire small, locally owned newspapers. She also served on the board of directors of the Talking Phone Book as Secretary-Treasurer beginning in 1987, making strategic decisions for the company. After completing her education in 1990, she returned to Western New York State to marry Philip M. Corwin II whom she had met in graduate school. The couple worked at The Talking Phone Book with Philip serving as chief financial officer. She also began a family, and has said of this time, "I didn't go into the office every day ... We had more board discussions over the kitchen table than the board room." The business was sold to Hearst Corporation in 2004 for $400 million, making Corwin and her siblings wealthy, according to the Buffalo News. Campaign disclosure forms have indicated Corwin's personal assets is between $58 and $158 million, mainly derived from her family's business.

== Community activities ==
Since 2004, Corwin has been President of the Philip M. and Jane Lewis Corwin Foundation to provide direct funding to educational, medical and religious charities that benefit children. A review of the foundation's financials by the Buffalo News indicated that more than half of its distributions have gone to Boston College, Philip Corwin's alma mater; the second largest recipient has been a school the Corwin children attended. In recent years, she has given $500 college scholarships to local public high school students, and has indicated she has not taken any tax benefits for her donations. She has also been a community volunteer, serving as president of a committee of the Women and Children's Hospital of Buffalo, as confirmation leader at her church, and as a member of a committee of the Community Foundation for Greater Buffalo. She served on the board of directors of Brookfield Country Club Women's Association and became a private sector protégé of Erie County Executive Christopher Collins serving as an assistant treasurer for his campaign from 2007 to 2008, according to the Buffalo News.

== State Assembly ==
Corwin has said she entered politics in 2008 because she "could not stand idly by and watch state government spend away our children's future." During her first campaign for the Assembly, she said the State needed to adopt a business-like approach, cut spending, cut taxes, end "unfunded mandates" and improve the business environment. She won the primary for the 142nd Assembly District seat against three other Republican candidates including incumbent Assemblyman Mike Cole, who had the Republican party endorsement, but who had been censured for fraternizing with an intern one year earlier. Corwin went on to defeat Working Families Party candidate Jeffrey Bono in the November 2008 general election, receiving 89 percent of the vote. She ran uncontested in the November 2010 general election, receiving endorsements from the Conservative and Independence parties of New York State.

While in the State Assembly, Corwin was appointed chair of the Assembly Minority Manufacturing Task Force and became ranking minority member of the Corporations, Authorities and Commissions Committee. She opposed a bill that would legalize gay marriage. She also opposed a loosening of state drug laws that would reduce long prison terms and give judges more leeway in sentencing, and voted "no" on a bill that required the unshackling of prisoners while giving birth. Based on her Assembly voting record on fiscal matters, the state Conservative Party placed her near the top in its 2009 and 2010 annual rankings of Assembly members.

== U.S. Congressional run ==
In February 2011, U.S. Representative Chris Lee resigned abruptly after reports surfaced that he had been flirting with a woman on Craigslist. Later that month, Corwin was unanimously chosen by Republican Party leaders to be the Party's nominee in the special election to fill the seat. (State law does not provide for primary elections prior to special elections.) Corwin also received the endorsements of the New York Conservative Party and the Independence Party of New York. She vied for the congressional seat against local businessman Jack Davis, an independent candidate running on the Tea Party ballot line; Erie County Clerk Kathy Hochul, a Democrat; and writer Ian Murphy the Green Party candidate. The election was held on May 24.

=== Political positions ===
Corwin said that if elected, she would work to cut federal government spending, reduce taxes and repeal the health care overhaul that was enacted by the Democratic majority Congress in 2010. She signed a tax pledge, promising to oppose all efforts to increase marginal tax rates on individuals and businesses, and to oppose reductions of tax credits or deductions that are not matched by reductions in tax rates.

She strongly supported U.S. Representative Paul Ryan's proposal to reform the Medicare program for senior citizens by turning it into a program that would give seniors vouchers to purchase private health insurance coverage. Corwin said the plan would protect Medicare for future generations by putting it on solid financial ground. On May 17, Corwin's campaign announced that Corwin would consider alternatives to the Ryan voucher plan, if they would help keep Medicare solvent. Corwin called her Democratic opponent's proposals to raise taxes on the wealthy an attack on those "who help our jobs grow and who will keep Medicare from going into bankruptcy", and has said that the Democrats, including Hochul, have offered no alternative to the Republicans' voucher plan.

When answering Project Vote Smart's "Political Courage" survey in 2008, Corwin replied that she believes abortion should be legal in the first trimester of pregnancy and in cases of rape, incest and when the life of the mother is endangered. When interviewed toward the end of her 2011 campaign for Congress, Corwin stated she would vote for any bill that restricted taxpayer funding of abortion, but indicated that abortion was "a woman's decision in the first trimester."

=== Campaign ===
The special election was initially thought to be a "certain victory" for the Republican candidate, but became "fiercely competitive", according to The New York Times, because of a U.S. House Republican plan to privatize Medicare. The Times has also cited the candidacy of third-party candidate Davis as a factor which is "siphoning support" from Corwin. The Hill said the Medicare issue seemed to be boosting Hochul's campaign, though it was difficult to handicap the race because of the presence of the third-party candidate.

A late April poll by Siena College had Corwin in the lead with 36 percent, followed by Hochul with 31 percent and Davis with 23 percent of the vote. An early May poll by the Democratic-leaning Public Policy Institute showed Hochul at 35 percent, Corwin at 31 percent and Davis at 24 percent. The non-partisan Rothenberg Political Report called the race a "toss-up" but tilting Democratic as of May 16. Additional polling by Siena and PPP in the days immediately preceding the election had Hochul leading by four and six point margins. Corwin ultimately lost to Hochul 47 to 43 percent in the special election. Independent candidate Jack Davis received 9 percent, and Green Party candidate Ian Murphy received 1 percent of the vote.

National media attention was given to a 15-second video clip that appeared to show Corwin's Assembly chief of staff, Michael Mallia, repeatedly asking the 78-year-old Davis why he had skipped a campaign debate, followed by Mallia shrieking as Davis apparently shoved him or flapped at the camera. The video clip was circulated by local and national Republican organizations and prompted bipartisan criticism of both Davis and Mallia. Requests to see a longer tape and a tape made by second camera were refused by Corwin and her campaign. In an interview with the National Journal, Corwin said she thought the video was self-explanatory, and indicated that Mallia had been acting on his own free time, and not as her employee while he was tracking and taping her opponent, Davis. In response to Davis' complaints that he had been harassed, Corwin said, "I've had cameras on me for two months now, and I've never hit anybody ... and I think that's the difference is how you handle a situation like that." One week after the election, Mallia resigned his position as Corwin's chief of staff as a result of the controversy.

Corwin responded to attacks that she basically wants to eliminate Medicare, by airing an ad claiming her opponent Hochul wanted to cut Social Security and Medicare. Corwin's ad was based on Hochul's debate statement that budget talks should put everything on the table. A FactCheck.org representative called Corwin's ad, "bogus"; Corwin's campaign responded that Hochul also supports Obama's health care law which includes $500 billion in reductions in payments to Medicare Advantage private insurers.

American Crossroads endorsed and provided support to Corwin's campaign, reflecting the national importance of the contest. The Rochester Business alliance endorsed Corwin, as did the FreedomWorks PAC. The Tea Party Express and TEA New York also endorsed Corwin with their leaders visiting Buffalo and Rochester to make it clear that Corwin was favored by the Tea Party, and to criticize Davis' use of the moniker.

Roll Call reported that Corwin had invested nearly $2.5 million of her own funds in the campaign as of May 13; Davis had promised to spend as much as $3 million of his own funds; and outside funds coming from both liberal and conservative groups had already "turned the Buffalo and Rochester airwaves into a steady stream of campaign ads."

On election day morning, Corwin obtained a court order from a Justice of the New York Supreme Court that took effect when the polls closed. The order would impound all voting equipment, temporarily enjoin the canvas of paper ballots and bar the certification of the winner pending further court proceedings. Corwin's campaign said such orders are usual in close elections. According to The Buffalo News, however, the order was likely rendered moot by Corwin's concession, also on May 24, 2011.

== Electoral history ==
Primary election September 9, 2008, N.Y. State Assembly, 142nd Assembly District
Party	Candidate	Votes	%
Republican	Jane L. Corwin	3,951	46
Republican	Michael W. Cole (incumbent)	3,063	36
Republican	Leonard A. Roberto	1,481	17
Republican	Jeffrey A. Bono, III	255	1
Total votes		8,570	100
Turnout			21

General election November 4, 2008, N.Y. State Assembly, 142nd Assembly District
Party	Candidate	Votes	%
Republican	Jane L. Corwin	25,929	72
Conservative	Jane L. Corwin	3,300	9
Independence	Jane L. Corwin	3,064	8
Working Families	Jeffrey A. Bono, III	4,084	11
Total votes		36,377	100
Turnout			39

General election November 2, 2010, N.Y. State Assembly, 142nd Assembly District
Party	Candidate	Votes	%
Republican	Jane L. Corwin	28,440	76
Conservative	Jane L. Corwin	5,004	13
Independence	Jane L. Corwin	4,225	11
Total votes		37,669	100
Turnout			39

Special election May 24, 2011, U.S. House of Representatives, NY-26
Party	Candidate	Votes	%
Democratic	Kathy Hochul	47,519	42.58
Working Families	Kathy Hochul	5,194	4.65
Republican	Jane Corwin	35,721	32.01
Conservative	Jane Corwin	9,090	8.15
Independence	Jane Corwin	2,376	2.13
Tea Party	Jack Davis	10,029	8.99
Green	Ian Murphy	1,177	1.05
Total votes		111,597	100.0
Turnout			25

== Personal life ==
Corwin and her husband Philip have been married for 21 years. The couple have three children and reside in Clarence, New York. Philip was previously the chief financial officer of the Talking Phone Book and has been active in Erie County politics. He is vice chair of Erie County Industrial Development Agency, Erie County director of economic development, and a member of board of Buffalo Niagara Enterprise which gives economic development assistance to companies in Western New York State.

New York State Assembly
Preceded by Michael W. Cole	New York State Assembly, 142nd District; January 1, 2009 – December 31, 2012	Succeeded by Michael P. Kearns
Preceded by Sean M. Ryan	New York State Assembly, 144th District; January 1, 2013 – 2016	Succeeded by Michael Norris
