= Daren Stone =

American football player (born 1985)

No. 39
- Position: Linebacker

Personal information
- Born: August 21, 1985 (age 41); St. James Parish, Jamaica
- Listed height: 6 ft 3 in (1.91 m)
- Listed weight: 211 lb (96 kg)

Career information
- High school: Lockport (Lockport, New York, U.S.)
- College: Maine
- NFL draft: 2007: 6th round, 203rd overall pick

Career history
- Atlanta Falcons (2007); Dallas Cowboys (2008); Baltimore Ravens (2008); Calgary Stampeders (2011); Saskatchewan Roughriders (2012)

Career NFL statistics
- Total tackles: 14
- Fumble recoveries: 1
- Pass deflections: 1
- Stats at Pro Football Reference

Daren Stone (born August 21, 1985) is an American former professional football player who was a safety in the National Football League (NFL) and Canadian Football League (CFL). He was selected by the Atlanta Falcons in the sixth round of the 2007 NFL draft. He played college football for the Maine Black Bears.

Stone was also a member of the Dallas Cowboys, Baltimore Ravens, Calgary Stampeders, and Saskatchewan Roughriders.

== Early life ==
Stone attended Lockport High School in Lockport, New York, and was a student and a letterman in football, basketball, and track. In football, as a senior, he was named the team's Defensive Player of the Year, was a first-team All-League selection, and was a second-team All-Western New York selection. In basketball, he was a second-team All-League selection. In track, he was a first-team All-Western New York selection. Daren Stone graduated from Lockport Senior High School in 2003.

== Professional career ==
=== Atlanta Falcons ===
As a rookie in 2007, Stone made the Atlanta Falcons' active roster. In his debut against the Buffalo Bills, he sacked quarterback J. P. Losman. Stone was released by the Falcons for Drunk Driving Arrest on August 30, 2008, during final cuts.

=== Dallas Cowboys ===
Stone was signed by the Dallas Cowboys on October 21, 2008, after safety Roy Williams was placed on injured reserve. Stone was released a week later on October 28 when the team re-signed cornerback Quincy Butler.

=== Baltimore Ravens ===
Stone was signed by the Baltimore Ravens on November 5, 2008, after the team waived cornerback Anwar Phillips. He contributed on special teams for the remainder of the season. In the 2009 AFC Championship Game versus the Pittsburgh Steelers, Stone committed an unnecessary roughness penalty that cost the Ravens field position (moving them from near midfield to their own 14) at a critical time in the game. Stone had suffered a concussion on the opening kickoff of the game.

An exclusive-rights free agent in the 2009 offseason, Stone was not tendered a contract offer by the Ravens.

=== Calgary Stampeders ===
On May 27, 2011, the Calgary Stampeders signed Stone as a free agent.

=== Saskatchewan Roughriders ===
On May 18, 2012, the Saskatchewan Roughriders signed Stone.
