= New Visions: Law & Government =

New York State vocational program

New Visions: Law & Government is an academic career-exploration program for high school seniors from the state of New York. The program is located at the New York State Education Department Building in Albany, New York. Offered through the Capital Region Board of Cooperative Educational Services (BOCES), New Visions: Law & Government integrates Advanced Placement United States Government and Politics with English, Law and Economics. The program offers college credit through the University at Albany, SUNY's University in the High School Program (UHS) and is the only high school program to offer college credit in Criminal Justice through UHS.

In the program, students are also placed in internships in places such as the New York Attorney General's office, various state courts, the New York State Legislature, and various public and private interest or advocacy organizations. Students participate in mock trials, mock congressional hearings and visit with many judges and lawyers over the course of the year. The Advanced Placement United States Government and Politics component emphasizes critical thinking, analysis and writing. The works read include: The Merchant of Venice, Crime and Punishment, Democracy in America, The Federalist Papers, The Brethren, All the President's Men, and One L, as well as many works of short fiction and newspaper and magazine articles. The program culminates with a week in Washington, D.C. where the class typically attends a session of the Supreme Court, meet with a Justice or his or her law clerks, meet with the students' Representatives, Senators, and Congressional staff, and attend a White House Press Briefing.

On February 7, 2015, the New Visions Law & Government class won the New York "We The People: The Citizen and the Constitution” State Finals and advanced to the National championship, marking the first time in the "We The People" program's 28-year history that an upstate team has won the State championship. At the 2015 "We The People: The Citizen and the Constitution” National Finals, the New Visions Law & Government class won an award for the highest score in Unit 3 (of six units), “How has the Constitution been changed to further the ideals contained in the Declaration of Independence?" On February 27, 2016, the New Visions Law & Government class won the New York "We The People: The Citizen and the Constitution” State Finals and advanced to the National championship for a second consecutive year."We the People: The Citizen and Constitution" is an intensive curriculum that provides students with a fundamental understanding of the Constitution and the Bill of Rights. Competing students act as experts testifying on constitutional issues in a simulated congressional hearing, demonstrating their knowledge and understanding of constitutional principles and have opportunities to evaluate, take, and defend positions on relevant historical and contemporary issues. Constitutional scholars, lawyers and government leaders from throughout the state, acting as congressional committee members, judge the student performances.
