= Lockport, Ohio =

Ghost town in Ohio, United States

Coordinates: 40.054°N 82.419°W

Lockport is a ghost town in Licking County, in the U.S. state of Ohio.

== History ==
Canal locks were located near the town site.
