= Lockport Mall =

Former shopping mall in New York State

- Location: South Lockport, New York, United States
- Coordinates: 43°08′51″N 78°41′38″W
- Opened: 1971
- Closed: 2006
- Demolished: 2011
- Developer: Saperston Real Estate
- Num. of stores: 1
- Num. of anchor tenants: 3
- Floor area: 340,000 sq ft (32,000 m^{2})
- Floors: 1

Lockport Mall was an enclosed shopping mall in South Lockport, New York, located on Transit Road (NY 78). It opened in 1971 and included three anchor stores as well as a movie theater. The mall closed in 2006 except for the Bon-Ton department store. First announced in 2007, plans for a Walmart supercenter would displace the rest of the former mall building. The mall's demolition began in April 2011.

== History ==
Lockport Mall opened in 1971 and was acquired by General Growth Properties seven years later. A 1984 expansion added Hills Department Store. The Sample closed in 1991, while AM&A's sold to The Bon-Ton in 1995. Hills became Ames in 1999; the same year, Montgomery Ward closed and became Rosa's Furniture. Due to the closing of Montgomery Ward, the mall started to decline. Ames closed in 2002, followed by many other mall stores.

Plans were first announced in 2003 to demolish everything but the Bon-Ton building and replace the mall structure with a Walmart supercenter. By late 2004, only nine stores remained operational at the mall, which at that point was slated for closure. Rosas closed in 2005. The theaters closed in January 2006.

The mall sat for several years until 2011, when it was finally demolished except for The Bon-Ton. Construction of the Walmart was repeatedly halted due to seagulls nesting on the site. In October 2013, construction finally continued on the site, and Walmart opened in 2015. The Bon-Ton announced its closure in 2018.
