= Rapids, New York =

- Census-designated place
- Location in Niagara County and the state of New York.

- Location within New York Location within the United States
- Coordinates: 43°6′5″N 78°38′28″W
- Country: United States
- State: New York
- County: Niagara

Area
  - Total: 3.64 sq mi (9.44 km^{2})
  - Land: 3.64 sq mi (9.44 km^{2})
  - Water: 0 sq mi (0.00 km^{2})
- Elevation: 590 ft (180 m)

Population (2020)
  - Total: 1,584
  - Density: 434.7/sq mi (167.83/km^{2})
- Time zone: UTC-5 (Eastern (EST))
  - Summer (DST): UTC-4 (EDT)
- ZIP Code: 14094 (Lockport)
- FIPS code: 36-60609
- GNIS feature ID: 0962191

Rapids is a hamlet (also a census-designated place) located in the Town of Lockport in Niagara County, New York, United States. As of the 2020 census, Rapids had a population of 1,584. The ZIP code for Rapids is 14094.

Rapids is located on the south edge of both the town and the county so that a small part of the community is in the Town of Clarence in Erie County. The hamlet lies at the junction of Tonawanda Creek Road, Rapids Road, and Goodrich Road. The community consists of a fire hall, a church, a few businesses, and many residences, primarily in Niagara County. It is part of the Buffalo–Niagara Falls Metropolitan Statistical Area.

== Geography ==
Rapids is located at 43°6′5″N 78°38′28″W (43.101324, -78.641134). The community is on the north side of the Tonawanda Creek, which forms the boundary between Niagara and Erie County.

According to the United States Census Bureau, the village has a total area of 3.7 square miles (9.6 km^{2}), all land.

Tonawanda Creek flows through the community.

== Demographics ==
Historical population
| Census | Pop. | Note | %± |
|---|---|---|---|
| 2020 | 1,584 | | — |
U.S. Decennial Census

According to the census of 2000, there were 1,356 people, 538 households, and 373 families residing in the village. The population density was 369.8 inhabitants per square mile (142.8/km^{2}). There were 582 housing units at an average density of 158.7 per square mile (61.3/km^{2}). The racial makeup of the CDP was 97.57% White, 1.25% African American, 0.44% Native American, 0.22% from other races, and 0.52% from two or more races. Hispanic or Latino people of any race comprised 0.44% of the population.

There were 538 households, out of which 35.9% had children under the age of 18 living with them, 51.7% were married couples living together, 11.7% had a female householder with no husband present, and 30.5% were non-families. 24.9% of all households were made up of individuals, and 8.0% had someone living alone who was 65 years of age or older. The average household size was 2.52 and the average family size was 3.02.

In the community, the population was spread out, with 27.5% under the age of 18, 6.7% from 18 to 24, 36.4% from 25 to 44, 20.0% from 45 to 64, and 9.4% who were 65 years of age or older. The median age was 34 years. For every 100 females, there were 101.5 males. For every 100 females age 18 and over, there were 101.8 males.

The median income for a household in the CDP was $38,813, and the median income for a family was $42,067. Males had a median income of $35,859 versus $24,844 for females. The per capita income for the CDP was $19,485. About 6.5% of families and 7.0% of the population lived below the poverty line, including 8.3% of those under age of 18 and none of those aged 65 or over.
