= South Lockport, New York =

- Census-designated place
- Location in Niagara County and the state of New York.

- Location within New York Location within the United States
- Coordinates: 43°8′3″N 78°41′10″W
- Country: United States
- State: New York
- County: Niagara

Area
  - Total: 6.21 sq mi (16.09 km^{2})
  - Land: 6.20 sq mi (16.05 km^{2})
  - Water: 0.015 sq mi (0.04 km^{2})
- Elevation: 633 ft (193 m)

Population (2020)
  - Total: 9,355
  - Density: 1,509.3/sq mi (582.76/km^{2})
- Time zone: UTC-5 (Eastern (EST))
  - Summer (DST): UTC-4 (EDT)
- ZIP Code: 14094 (Lockport)
- FIPS code: 36-69386
- GNIS feature ID: 0965810

South Lockport is a hamlet (and census-designated place) located in the Town of Lockport in Niagara County, New York, United States. As of the 2020 census, South Lockport had a population of 9,355. It is part of the Buffalo–Niagara Falls Metropolitan Statistical Area.

South Lockport is south of the City of Lockport on New York State Route 78.

== Geography ==
South Lockport is located at 43°8′3″N 78°41′10″W (43.134057, -78.686132).

According to the United States Census Bureau, the region has a total area of 5.8 square miles (15 km^{2}), of which 5.8 square miles (15 km^{2}) is land and 0.04 square miles (0.10 km^{2}) (0.35%) is water.

== Demographics ==
Historical population
Census	Pop.	Note	%±
2020	9,355		—
U.S. Decennial Census

As of the census of 2000, there were 8,552 people, 3,544 households, and 2,317 families residing in the community. The population density was 1,488.4 inhabitants per square mile (574.7/km^{2}). There were 3,816 housing units at an average density of 664.1 per square mile (256.4/km^{2}). The racial makeup of the CDP was 91.36% White, 4.89% African American, 0.48% Native American, 1.06% Asian, 0.01% Pacific Islander, 0.54% from other races, and 1.66% from two or more races. Hispanic or Latino of any race were 1.77% of the population.

There were 3,544 households, out of which 33.1% had children under the age of 18 living with them, 46.7% were married couples living together, 15.1% had a female householder with no husband present, and 34.6% were non-families. 29.4% of all households were made up of individuals, and 9.6% had someone living alone who was 65 years of age or older. The average household size was 2.41 and the average family size was 2.98.

In the community, the population was spread out, with 26.3% under the age of 18, 9.1% from 18 to 24, 30.4% from 25 to 44, 23.0% from 45 to 64, and 11.2% who were 65 years of age or older. The median age was 35 years. For every 100 females, there were 89.9 males. For every 100 females age 18 and over, there were 86.5 males.

The median income for a household in the region was $36,410, and the median income for a family was $45,370. Males had a median income of $34,840 versus $24,162 for females. The per capita income for the CDP was $18,945. About 11.0% of families and 12.5% of the population were below the poverty line, including 17.4% of those under age 18 and 6.4% of those age 65 or over.

== Education ==
Most of the CDP is in the Lockport City School District, while a portion is in the Starpoint Central School District.
