= Cheektowaga Central High School =

Cheektowaga High School
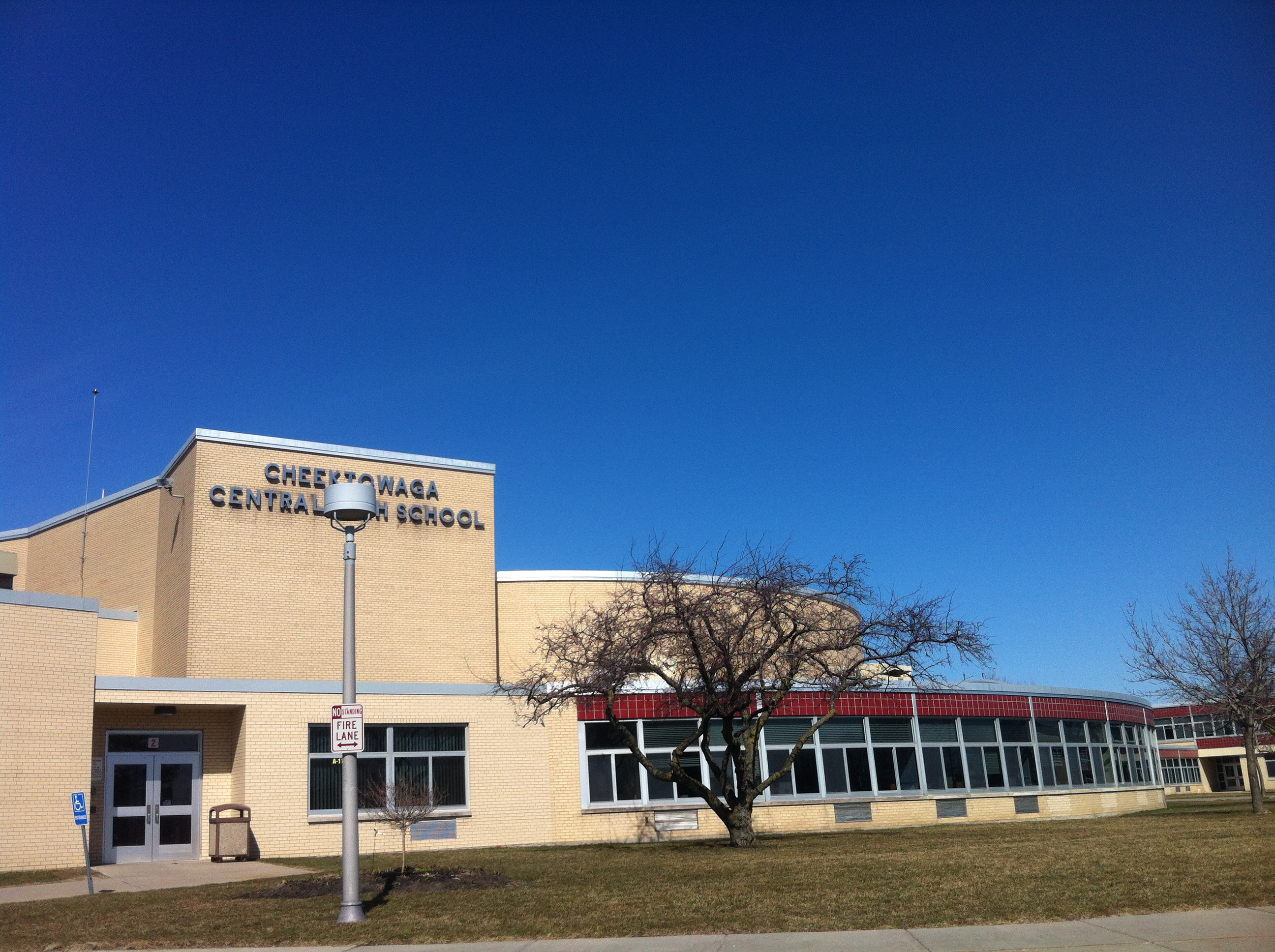

Location
- 3600 Union Road; Cheektowaga, Erie, New York 14225; 42.911°N 78.757°W

Information
- Principal: Karin Cyganovich
- Teaching staff: 67.29 (FTE)
- Grades: 9-12
- Student to teacher ratio: 10.21
- Color
- Team name: Chargers
- Yearbook: Centorial
- Website: Cheektowaga High School

Cheektowaga Central High School is a high school in Cheektowaga, New York located at 3600 Union Road and serves grades 9 through 12. It is part of the Cheektowaga Central School District.

== History ==
Cheektowaga Central High School opened on September 7, 1960, and was dedicated on April 23, 1961.
