= Lockport City School District =

School district in New York, United States

Address
- 130 Beattie Avenue Lockport, New York, 14094; United States

District information
- Type: Public
- Grades: K–12
- NCES District ID: 3617670

Students and staff
- Students: 4,384
- Teachers: 336.0
- Staff: 298.6
- Student–teacher ratio: 13.05

Other information
- Website: www.lockportschools.org

Lockport City School District is a school district headquartered in Lockport, New York.

The district includes all of the City of Lockport, most of the Town of Lockport, and portions of the following towns: Cambria and Pendleton. It also includes almost all of the South Lockport census-designated place.

== Schools ==
Secondary schools:

- Lockport High School (Built in 1954)
- Lockport High School West (Built in 1931) Opened on September 8, 1930 and dedicated on January 21, 1931 as Charlotte S. Cross Elementary School
- Aaron Mossell Junior High School (Built in 1940) Opened on March 11, 1940 and dedicated on April 26, 1940

Primary schools:

- Emmet Belknap Intermediate School (Built in 1925) Dedicated on November 17, 1925. Addition constructed in 1940 (dedicated on April 25, 1940) for a combination elementary-junior high school.
- Anna Merritt Elementary School (Opened on September 9, 1959)
- Charles Upson Elementary School (Dedicated on November 15, 1956)
- George M. Southard Elementary School (Built in 1965)
- Roy B. Kelley Elementary School (Opened on September 9, 1959)
