= List of BOCES =

The following is a list of boards of cooperative educational services (BOCES) in the United States.

== State of New York ==
- Broome-Delaware-Tioga
- Capital Region
- Cattaraugus-Allegany-Erie-Wyoming
- Cayuga-Onondaga
- Champlain Valley Educational Services
- Delaware-Chenango-Madison-Otsego
- Dutchess
- Erie 1
- Erie 2 Chautauqua-Cattaraugus
- Franklin-Essex-Hamilton
- Genesee Valley
- Hamilton-Fulton-Montgomery
- Herkimer-Fulton-Hamilton-Otsego
- Jefferson-Lewis-Hamilton-Herkimer-Oneida
- Madison-Oneida
- Monroe #1
- Monroe 2 – Orleans
- Nassau
- Oneida-Herkimer-Madison
- Onondaga-Cortland-Madison
- Orange-Ulster
- Orleans-Niagara
- Oswego
- Otsego-Delaware-Schoharie-Greene
- Putnam-Northern Westchester
- Questar III (Rensselaer-Columbia-Greene)
- Rockland
- St. Lawrence-Lewis
- Schuyler-Steuben-Chemung-Tioga-Allegany (Greater Southern Tier)
- Eastern Suffolk
- Western Suffolk
- Sullivan
- Tompkins-Seneca-Tioga
- Ulster
- Washington-Saratoga-Warren-Hamilton-Essex
- Wayne-Finger Lakes
- Southern Westchester

== See also ==
- Board of cooperative educational services (New York)
- List of school districts in Colorado
- Lists of school districts in New York
