= Niagara County, New York =

County in New York, United States

- County
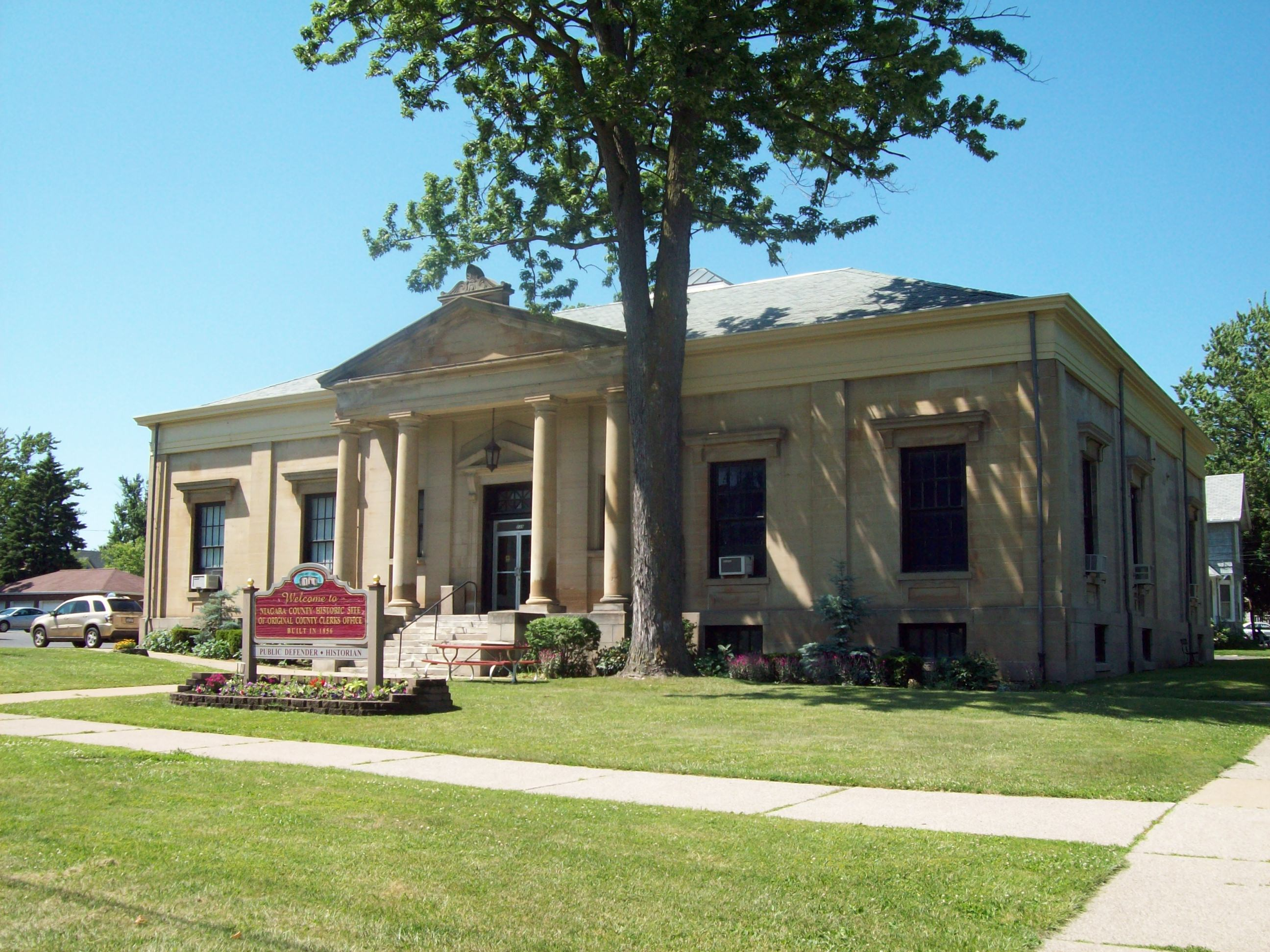
- Niagara County Clerks Office

- Seal

- Location within the U.S. state of New York
- Coordinates: 43°19′N 78°47′W
- Country: United States
- State: New York
- Founded: March 11, 1808
- Seat: Lockport
- Largest city: Niagara Falls

Area
  - Total: 1,140 sq mi (3,000 km^{2})
  - Land: 522 sq mi (1,350 km^{2})
  - Water: 617 sq mi (1,600 km^{2}) 54%

Population (2020)
  - Total: 212,666
  - Estimate (2025): 208,912 ▼
  - Density: 407/sq mi (157/km^{2})
- Time zone: UTC−5 (Eastern)
  - Summer (DST): UTC−4 (EDT)
- Congressional districts: 23rd, 24th, 26th
- Website: www.niagaracounty.com

Niagara County is in the U.S. state of New York. As of the 2020 United States census, the population was 212,666. The county seat is Lockport. The county name is from the Iroquois word Onguiaahra; meaning the strait or thunder of waters. The county is part of the Western New York region of the state.

Niagara County is part of the Buffalo–Niagara Falls metropolitan area, and across the Canada–US border is the province of Ontario.

It is the location of Niagara Falls and Fort Niagara, and has many parks and lake shore recreation communities. In the summer of 2008, Niagara County celebrated its 200th birthday with the first settlement of the county, of Niagara Falls.

== History ==
When western New York became part of the New York colony in 1763, the present Niagara County was part of Albany County. Prior to the British, the area was part of New France.

Albany was an enormous county, including the northern part of New York State as well as all of the present State of Vermont and, in theory, extending westward to the Pacific Ocean. This county was reduced in size on July 3, 1766, by the creation of Cumberland County, and further on March 16, 1770, by the creation of Gloucester County, both containing territory now in Vermont.

On March 12, 1772, what was left of Albany County was split into three parts, one remaining under the name Albany County. One of the other pieces, Tryon County, contained the western portion (and thus, since no western boundary was specified, theoretically still extended west to the Pacific). The eastern boundary of Tryon County was approximately five miles west of the present city of Schenectady, and the county included the western part of the Adirondack Mountains and the area west of the West Branch of the Delaware River. The area then designated as Tryon County now includes 37 counties of New York State. The county was named for William Tryon, colonial governor of New York.

In the years prior to 1776, most of the Loyalists in Tryon County fled to Canada including the likes of local judge John Butler and militia commander Sir John Johnson. In 1784, following the peace treaty that ended the American Revolutionary War, the name of Tryon County was changed to honor the general, Richard Montgomery, who had captured several places in Canada and died attempting to capture the city of Quebec, replacing the name of the hated British governor.

In 1789, Ontario County was split off from Montgomery. In turn, Genesee County was created from Ontario County in 1802.

Niagara County was created from Genesee County in 1808. It was, however, larger than the present Niagara County even though it consisted of only the Town of Cambria.

From 1814 to 1817, records of Cattaraugus County were divided between Belmont (the seat of Allegany County) and Buffalo (then in Niagara County). Niagara County governed the western portion of Cattaraugus County, then known as the town of Perry.

In 1821, Erie County was created from Niagara County.

The county has a number of properties on the National Register of Historic Places.

== Geography ==
According to the U.S. Census Bureau, the county has a total area of 1,139 square miles, of which 522 square miles (1,350 km^{2}) is land and 617 square miles (1,600 km^{2}) (54%) is water.

Niagara County is in the most western part of New York State, just north of the city Buffalo and1,140 square miles (3,000 km^{2}) bordering Lake Ontario on its northern border, and the Niagara River Canada on its western border.

The county's primary geographic feature is Niagara Falls, the riverbed of which has eroded seven miles south over the past 12,000 years since the last ice age. The Niagara River and Niagara Falls, are in effect, the drainage ditch for four of the Great Lakes which constitute the world's largest supply of fresh water. The water flows north from Lake Erie, then through the Niagara River, goes over Niagara Falls, and then on to Lake Ontario and the St. Lawrence River, eventually emptying into the North Atlantic Ocean. Today, tourists and visitors to the Falls see a diminished flow of water over the Falls, since a portion of the flow has been diverted for hydroelectric power purposes. Both the American and Canadian side of the Niagara River have massive electrical power plants.

The Niagara Gorge is the path Niagara Falls has taken over thousands of years as it continues to erode. Niagara Falls started at the Niagara Escarpment which cuts Niagara County in half in an east–west direction. North of the Escarpment lies the Lake Plain, which is a fertile flatland used to grow grapes, apples, peaches and other fruits and vegetables. The grape variety Niagara, source of most American white grape juice but not esteemed for wine, was first grown in the county, in 1868. Viticulture, or wine culture has begun to take place, with several wineries below the escarpment. This has helped to improve the depressed economy of the region.

=== Adjacent counties and areas ===
- Orleans County - east
- Genesee County - southeast
- Erie County - south
- Regional Municipality of Niagara, Ontario, Canada - west

=== Major highways ===
- Interstate 190 (Niagara Thruway)
- U.S. Route 62
- US 62 Business
- New York State Route 18
- New York State Route 31
- New York State Route 78
- New York State Route 93
- New York State Route 104
- New York State Route 265
- New York State Route 384
- New York State Route 425
- Niagara Scenic Parkway
- LaSalle Expressway

=== State protected areas ===
- De Veaux Woods State Park, north of the City of Niagara Falls.
- Devil's Hole State Park, immediately north of the City of Niagara Falls.
- Fort Niagara State Park, located at the mouth of the Niagara River.
- Earl W. Brydges Artpark State Park, in the Town of Lewiston.
- Four Mile Creek State Park, on the shore of Lake Ontario.
- Golden Hill State Park, on the shore of Lake Ontario.
- Hartland Swamp Wildlife Management Area—a conservation area in the Town of Hartland.
- Joseph Davis State Park, along the Niagara River.
- Niagara Reservation State Park, in the City of Niagara Falls.
- Reservoir State Park, south of the power reservoir.
- Tonawanda Wildlife Management Area, partly in the Town of Royalton.
- Wilson-Tuscarora State Park, on the shore of Lake Ontario.

== Government and politics ==
United States presidential election results for Niagara County, New York
Year	Republican / Whig		Democratic		Third party(ies)	
Year	No.	%	No.	%	No.	%
1828	1,759	67.78%	836	32.22%	0	0.00%
1832	2,167	62.34%	1,309	37.66%	0	0.00%
1836	2,267	51.41%	2,143	48.59%	0	0.00%
1840	2,964	56.40%	2,219	42.23%	72	1.37%
1844	3,100	52.55%	2,589	43.89%	210	3.56%
1848	2,828	45.28%	1,313	21.02%	2,104	33.69%
1852	3,413	46.55%	2,863	39.05%	1,056	14.40%
1856	3,906	50.37%	1,864	24.04%	1,985	25.60%
1860	4,992	57.16%	3,741	42.84%	0	0.00%
1864	4,839	53.02%	4,287	46.98%	0	0.00%
1868	5,118	52.16%	4,695	47.84%	0	0.00%
1872	5,404	54.99%	4,396	44.73%	27	0.27%
1876	5,575	48.26%	5,890	50.98%	88	0.76%
1880	6,478	51.75%	5,937	47.42%	104	0.83%
1884	5,875	46.49%	6,193	49.01%	569	4.50%
1888	6,886	49.19%	6,429	45.92%	684	4.89%
1892	6,663	45.83%	6,850	47.12%	1,024	7.04%
1896	8,626	55.69%	6,441	41.58%	423	2.73%
1900	9,352	53.13%	7,726	43.90%	523	2.97%
1904	10,881	56.81%	7,550	39.42%	724	3.78%
1908	11,145	54.75%	8,574	42.12%	637	3.13%
1912	5,654	30.06%	7,647	40.66%	5,507	29.28%
1916	12,212	57.54%	8,367	39.42%	645	3.04%
1920	21,193	68.29%	7,416	23.90%	2,423	7.81%
1924	25,874	67.98%	7,993	21.00%	4,195	11.02%
1928	33,229	63.35%	16,881	32.18%	2,343	4.47%
1932	30,852	58.33%	20,765	39.26%	1,274	2.41%
1936	30,144	49.08%	29,207	47.56%	2,064	3.36%
1940	36,729	52.39%	33,207	47.37%	165	0.24%
1944	37,614	51.76%	34,850	47.96%	202	0.28%
1948	35,858	49.65%	34,119	47.24%	2,242	3.10%
1952	54,843	59.97%	36,504	39.91%	108	0.12%
1956	62,433	67.43%	30,161	32.57%	0	0.00%
1960	50,001	49.13%	51,680	50.78%	84	0.08%
1964	28,663	29.86%	67,260	70.07%	62	0.06%
1968	38,796	44.12%	41,999	47.77%	7,130	8.11%
1972	54,777	58.22%	38,991	41.44%	323	0.34%
1976	46,101	51.09%	43,667	48.39%	471	0.52%
1980	38,760	44.86%	40,405	46.77%	7,229	8.37%
1984	51,289	55.23%	41,368	44.55%	201	0.22%
1988	42,537	48.97%	43,801	50.42%	530	0.61%
1992	30,401	31.48%	35,649	36.91%	30,534	31.61%
1996	31,438	35.15%	44,203	49.42%	13,803	15.43%
2000	40,952	43.91%	47,781	51.23%	4,537	4.86%
2004	47,111	48.78%	47,602	49.29%	1,867	1.93%
2008	46,348	48.65%	47,303	49.65%	1,621	1.70%
2012	43,240	48.58%	43,986	49.42%	1,787	2.01%
2016	51,961	56.23%	35,559	38.48%	4,882	5.28%
2020	56,068	53.85%	46,029	44.21%	2,026	1.95%
2024	58,678	57.01%	43,438	42.21%	802	0.78%

=== Structure ===
Niagara County is governed by a 15-member Legislature, with the Chairman of the Legislature as the de facto head of county government. The 2024 Legislature, consists of 12 members of the Republican-led Majority Caucus and three members of the Democratic-led Minority Caucus. The Legislature formerly consisted of 19 members, but was downsized to 15 seats effective January 1, 2012, based on the results of a public referendum.

A subordinate county manager reports to the County Legislature. Governing functions of the Legislature rely on a committee system. There are five standing committees and one long-term ad hoc committee: Administration; Community Services; Community Safety and Security; Economic Development; Public Works; and the ad hoc Refuse Disposal District Committee.

The dominant political party in the Niagara County Legislature is currently the Republican Party, which is ancestrally the dominant party in Niagara County.

=== 2024 Legislature ===
Chairman: Rebecca J. Wydysh
Vice Chairman: Anthony J. Nemi
Majority Leader: Randy R. Bradt
Minority Leader: Christopher A. Robins

1st District: Irene M. Myers
2nd District: Rebecca J. Wydysh
3rd District: Christopher J. McKimmie
4th District: Jeffrey Elder
5th District: Christopher A. Robins
6th District: Christopher Voccio
7th District: Jesse P. Gooch
8th District: Richard L. Andres
9th District: Randy R. Bradt
10th District: David E. Godfrey
11th District: Anthony J. Nemi
12th District: Carla L. Speranza
13th District: Richard E. Abbott
14th District: Shawn A. Foti
15th District: Michael A. Hill

=== Other entities ===
In addition to the areas mentioned above, much of Niagara County is serviced by a Water District and a Sewer District. Both bodies are subordinate to the County Legislature; the former has a direct relationship, while the latter is currently under limited oversight of the town supervisors within the district.

=== State and federal government ===
Office	District	Area of the county	Officeholder	Party	First took office	Residence
Congressman	New York's 23rd congressional district	Lockport (part of both city and town), Pendleton, Wheatfield (part)	Nick Langworthy	Republican	2023	Pendleton, Niagara County
Congressman	New York's 24th congressional district	Baker, Cambria, Hartland, Lewiston (both city and town), Lockport (part of both city and town), Middleport, Newfane, Porter, Royalton, Somerset, Wilson (town), Youngstown	Claudia Tenney	Republican	2021	Canadaigua, Ontario County
Congressman	New York's 26th congressional district	North Tonawanda, Niagara, Niagara Falls, Wheatfield (part)	Tim Kennedy	Democratic	2024	Buffalo, Erie County
State Senator	62nd State Senate District	All	Robert G. Ortt	Republican	2015	Newfane, Niagara County
State Assemblyman	140th State Assembly District	North Tonawanda	William Conrad III	Democratic	2021	Kenmore, Erie County
State Assemblyman	144th State Assembly District	Roughly the north and east parts of the county (Towns of Hartland, Lockport, Newfane, Porter, Royalton, Somerset, Wilson)	Paul Bologna	Republican	2025	Clarence, Erie County
State Assemblyman	145th State Assembly District	Roughly the west part of the county (Towns of Cambria, Lewiston, Niagara, Wheatfield, City of Niagara Falls, Tuscarora Reservation)	Angelo Morinello	Republican	2017	Niagara Falls, Niagara County
State Assemblyman	146th State Assembly District	Pendleton	Karen McMahon	Democratic	2019	East Amherst, Erie County

Niagara County is part of:

- The 8th Judicial District of the New York Supreme Court
- The 4th Division of the New York Supreme Court, Appellate Division

== Demographics ==
Historical population
Census	Pop.	Note	%±
1810	8,971		—
1820	22,990		156.3%
1830	18,482		−19.6%
1840	31,132		68.4%
1850	42,276		35.8%
1860	50,399		19.2%
1870	50,437		0.1%
1880	54,173		7.4%
1890	62,491		15.4%
1900	74,961		20.0%
1910	92,036		22.8%
1920	118,705		29.0%
1930	149,329		25.8%
1940	160,110		7.2%
1950	189,992		18.7%
1960	242,269		27.5%
1970	235,720		−2.7%
1980	227,354		−3.5%
1990	220,756		−2.9%
2000	219,846		−0.4%
2010	216,469		−1.5%
2020	212,666		−1.8%
2025 (est.)	208,912	▼	−1.8%
U.S. Decennial Census; 1790-1960 1900-1990; 1990-2000 2010-2019

=== 2020 census ===
Niagara County, New York – Racial and ethnic composition Note: the US Census treats Hispanic/Latino as an ethnic category. This table excludes Latinos from the racial categories and assigns them to a separate category. Hispanics/Latinos may be of any race.
Race / Ethnicity (NH = Non-Hispanic)	Pop 1980	Pop 1990	Pop 2000	Pop 2010	Pop 2020	% 1980	% 1990	% 2000	% 2010	% 2020
White alone (NH)	211,478	203,818	197,757	188,907	173,691	93.02%	92.33%	89.95%	87.27%	81.67%
Black or African American alone (NH)	10,926	11,973	13,356	14,511	16,206	4.81%	5.42%	6.08%	6.70%	7.62%
Native American or Alaska Native alone (NH)	2,329	1,969	1,996	2,135	2,294	1.02%	0.89%	0.91%	0.99%	1.08%
Asian alone (NH)	486	779	1,248	1,807	2,439	0.21%	0.35%	0.57%	0.83%	1.15%
Native Hawaiian or Pacific Islander alone (NH)	x	x	42	55	45	x	x	0.02%	0.03%	0.02%
Other race alone (NH)	319	119	171	185	737	0.14%	0.05%	0.08%	0.09%	0.35%
Mixed race or Multiracial (NH)	x	x	2,363	4,175	9,436	x	x	1.07%	1.93%	4.44%
Hispanic or Latino (any race)	1,816	2,098	2,913	4,694	7,818	0.80%	0.95%	1.33%	2.17%	3.68%
Total	227,354	220,756	219,846	216,469	212,666	100.00%	100.00%	100.00%	100.00%	100.00%

=== 2000 census ===
As of the census of 2010, there were 216,469 people, 87,846 households, and 58,593 families residing in the county. The population density was 420 inhabitants per square mile (160/km^{2}). There were 95,715 housing units at an average density of 183 units per square mile (71/km^{2}). The racial makeup of the county was 90.70% White, 6.15% Black or African American, 0.94% Native American, 0.58% Asian, 0.02% Pacific Islander, 0.40% from other races, and 1.21% from two or more races. 1.33% of the population were Hispanic or Latino of any race. 23.6% were of German, 18.1% Italian, 11.3% Irish, 11.2% Polish and 8.3% English ancestry. 94.5% spoke English, 1.6% Spanish and 1.0% Italian as their first language.

There were 87,846 households, out of which 30.90% had children under the age of 18 living with them, 50.30% were married couples living together, 12.30% had a female householder with no husband present, and 33.30% were non-families. 28.60% of all households were made up of individuals, and 12.00% had someone living alone who was 65 years of age or older. The average household size was 2.45 and the average family size was 3.03.

In the county, the population was spread out, with 24.70% under the age of 18, 8.50% from 18 to 24, 28.40% from 25 to 44, 23.10% from 45 to 64, and 15.40% who were 65 years of age or older. The median age was 38 years. For every 100 females there were 93.30 males. For every 100 females age 18 and over, there were 89.50 males.

The median income for a household in the county was $38,136, and the median income for a family was $47,817. Males had a median income of $37,468 versus $24,668 for females. The per capita income for the county was $19,219. About 8.20% of families and 10.60% of the population were below the poverty line, including 15.00% of those under age 18 and 7.30% of those age 65 or over.

== Education ==
Niagara University is located in Lewiston, New York. SUNY Niagara is located in Sanborn, New York. Many Niagara County residents also attend Erie and other Western New York County Schools. In the Buffalo Metro area there are more than 20 public and private colleges and universities offering programs in technical and vocational training, graduate, and professional studies.

=== K-12 school districts ===
School districts include:

- Barker Central School District
- Lewiston-Porter Central School District
- Lockport City School District
- Newfane Central School District
- Niagara Falls City School District
- Niagara-Wheatfield Central School District
- North Tonawanda City School District
- Royalton-Hartland Central School District
- Starpoint Central School District
- Wilson Central School District

== Communities ==
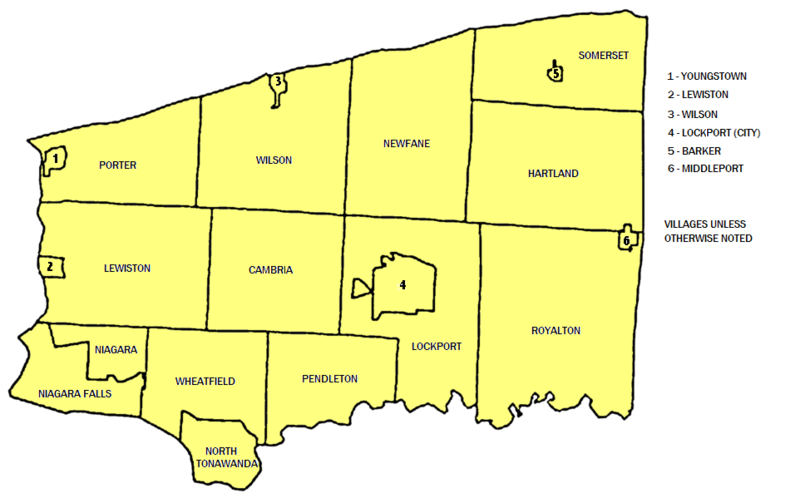
Map of Niagara County's municipalities

=== Larger settlements ===
#	Location	Population	Type	Area
1	Niagara Falls	50,193	City	Greater Niagara
2	North Tonawanda	31,568	City	Greater Niagara
3	Lockport	21,165	City	Southeast
4	South Lockport	8,234	CDP	Southeast
5	Newfane	3,822	CDP	Lake Shore
6	Lewiston	2,701	Village	Greater Niagara
7	Youngstown	1,935	Village	Greater Niagara
8	Middleport	1,840	Village	Southeast
9	Sanborn	1,645	CDP	Greater Niagara
10	Rapids	1,636	CDP	Southeast
11	Ransomville	1,419	CDP	Lake Shore
12	Wilson	1,264	Village	Lake Shore
13	Gasport	1,248	CDP/Hamlet	Southeast
14	Olcott	1,241	CDP	Lake Shore
15	Niagara University	940	CDP	Greater Niagara
16	Barker	533	Village	Lake Shore

=== Towns ===
- Cambria
- Hartland
- Lewiston
- Lockport
- Newfane
- Niagara
- Pendleton
- Porter
- Royalton
- Somerset
- Wheatfield
- Wilson

=== Hamlets ===
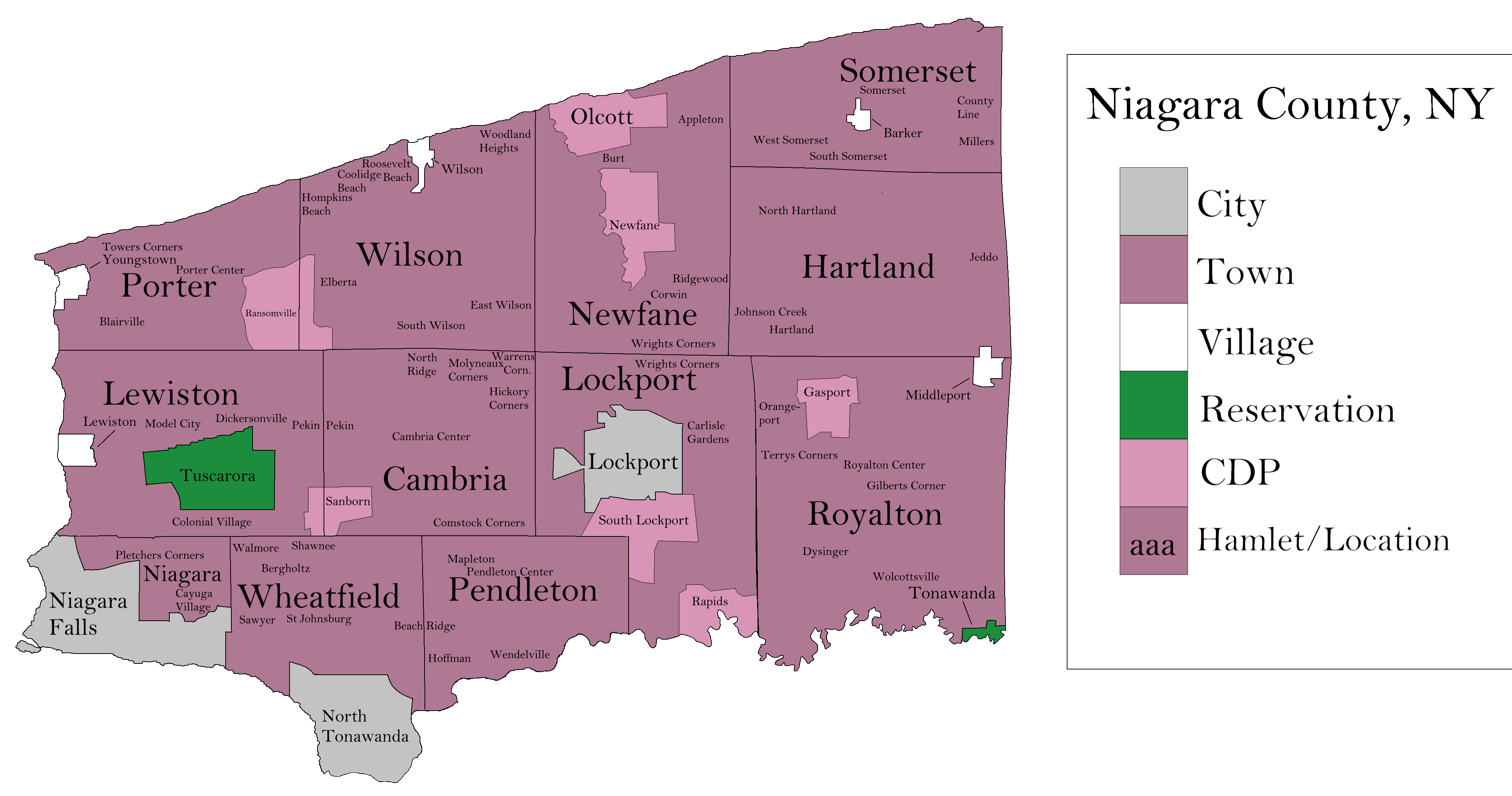
Also a map showing Niagara County's municipalities, but with Census Designated Places and Hamlets

- Nashville
- Orangeport
- Pekin

=== CDPs ===
- Newfane
- Niagara University
- Olcott
- Ransomville
- Rapids
- Sanborn
- South Lockport

=== Indian reservations ===
- Tuscarora Reservation
- Tonawanda Reservation

== See also ==
- List of counties in New York
- National Register of Historic Places listings in Niagara County, New York
- Niagara County Tribune/Sentinel
