= List of places in New York: E =

This list of current cities, towns, unincorporated communities, counties, and other recognized places in the U.S. state of New York also includes information on the number and names of counties in which the place lies, and its lower and upper zip code bounds, if applicable.

List of places in New York: A | B | C | D | E | F | G | H | I | J | K | L | M | N | O | P | Q | R | S | T | U | V | W | X | Y | Z

Name of place	Counties	Principal county	Lower zip code	Upper zip code
Eagle	1	Wyoming County	14009	
Eagle Bay	1	Herkimer County	13331	
Eagle Bridge	1	Rensselaer County	12057	
Eagle Center	1	Wyoming County	14024	
Eagle Harbor	1	Orleans County	14442	
Eagle Lake	1	Essex County	12883	
Eagle Mills	1	Rensselaer County	12180	
Eagle Nest	1	Hamilton County		
Eagle Point	1	Livingston County	14454	
Eagle Valley	1	Orange County	10974	
Eagle Village	1	Onondaga County	13104	
Eagleville	1	Madison County		
Eagleville	1	Washington County	12873	
Earlton	1	Greene County	12058	
Earlville	1	Franklin County	12920	
Earlville	2	Chenango County	13332	
Earlville	1	Madison County	13332	
Earlville	2	Madison County	13332	
East	1	Westchester County	10704	
East Afton	1	Chenango County		
East Alexander	1	Genesee County		
East Amboy	1	Oswego County		
East Amherst	1	Erie County	14051	
East Arcade	1	Wyoming County	14009	
East Atlantic Beach	1	Nassau County	11561	
East Aurora	1	Erie County	14052	
East Avon	1	Livingston County	14414	
East Barre	1	Orleans County		
East Bay	1	Wayne County	14590	
East Bay Park	1	Wayne County		
East Beekmantown	1	Clinton County	12901	
East Bend Park	1	Dutchess County	12603	
East Bennington	1	Wyoming County	14040	
East Bergen	1	Genesee County		
East Berkshire	1	Tioga County	13736	
East Berne	1	Albany County	12059	
East Bethany	1	Genesee County	14054	
East Bloomfield	1	Ontario County	14443	
East Boston	1	Madison County		
East Boylston	1	Oswego County		
East Branch	1	Delaware County	13756	
East Brentwood	1	Suffolk County	11717	
East Buffalo	1	Erie County		
East Buskirk	1	Rensselaer County		
East Campbell	1	Steuben County	14870	
East Cayuga Heights	1	Tompkins County	14850	
East Chatham	1	Columbia County	12060	
Eastchester	1	Bronx County		
East Chester	1	Orange County	10918	
Eastchester	1	Westchester County	10709	
Eastchester	1	Westchester County		
East Clarence	1	Erie County		
East Cobleskill	1	Schoharie County	12157	
East Cochecton	1	Sullivan County		
East Coldenham	1	Orange County	12550	
East Concord	1	Erie County	14055	
East Corning	1	Steuben County	14830	
East Creek	1	Herkimer County		
East Cutchogue	1	Suffolk County	11935	
East De Kalb	1	St. Lawrence County	13630	
East Delhi	1	Delaware County		
East Dickinson	1	Franklin County	12930	
East Durham	1	Greene County	12423	
East Eden	1	Erie County	14057	
East Elba	1	Genesee County		
East Elma	1	Erie County	14052	
East Elmhurst	1	Queens County	11369	
East Elmira	1	Chemung County		
Eastern Parkway	1	Kings County		
East Farmingdale	1	Suffolk County	11735	
East Fishkill	1	Dutchess County	12533	
East Fishkill	1	Dutchess County		
East Flatbush	1	Kings County		
East Floyd	1	Oneida County	13354	
East Frankfort	1	Herkimer County	13340	
East Freetown	1	Cortland County	13055	
East Gaines	1	Orleans County	14411	
East Galway	1	Saratoga County	12850	
East Garden City	1	Nassau County		
East Geneva	1	Seneca County		
East Genoa	1	Cayuga County	13092	
East Glenville	1	Schenectady County	12302	
East Grafton	1	Rensselaer County		
East Greenbush	1	Rensselaer County	12061	
East Greenbush	1	Rensselaer County		
East Greenville	1	Greene County		
East Greenwich	1	Washington County	12826	
East Groveland	1	Livingston County		
East Guilford	1	Chenango County		
East Half Hollow Hills	1	Suffolk County	11746	
East Hamburg	1	Erie County		
East Hamilton	1	Madison County	13355	
East Hampton	1	Suffolk County	11937	
East Hampton	1	Suffolk County		
East Hampton North	1	Suffolk County		
East Hartford	1	Washington County	12832	
East Hauppauge	1	Suffolk County		
East Hebron	1	Washington County	12865	
East Hempstead	1	Nassau County	11553	
East Herkimer	1	Herkimer County	13350	
East Hill	1	Tompkins County	14850	
East Hills	1	Nassau County	11576	
East Hillsdale	1	Columbia County		
East Homer	1	Cortland County	13056	
East Hoosick	1	Rensselaer County		
East Hounsfield	1	Jefferson County	13610	
East Huntington	1	Suffolk County	11743	
East Irvington	1	Westchester County	10533	
East Islip	1	Suffolk County	11730	
East Ithaca	1	Tompkins County	14850	
East Java	1	Wyoming County		
East Jefferson	1	Schoharie County	12093	
East Jewett	1	Greene County	12424	
East Kilns	1	Clinton County		
East Kingston	1	Ulster County	12401	
East Koy	1	Wyoming County	14536	
East Lake Ronkonkoma	1	Suffolk County	11779	
East Lancaster	1	Erie County		
East Lansing	1	Tompkins County	13073	
East Leon	1	Cattaraugus County	14719	
East Lindley	1	Steuben County		
East Line	1	Saratoga County	12020	
East McDonough	1	Chenango County	13830	
East Maine	1	Broome County	13790	
East Marion	1	Suffolk County	11939	
East Martinsburg	1	Lewis County	13367	
East Masonville	1	Delaware County	13839	
East Massapequa	1	Nassau County	11758	
East Meadow	1	Nassau County	11554	
East Meredith	1	Delaware County	13757	
East Middletown	1	Orange County		
Eastmor	1	Rensselaer County	12180	
East Moriches	1	Suffolk County	11940	
East Nassau	1	Rensselaer County	12062	
East Neck	1	Suffolk County	11743	
East Neck	1	Suffolk County	11743	
East Newark	1	Tioga County		
East New York	1	Kings County	11207	
East Nichols	1	Tioga County	13812	
East Northport	1	Suffolk County	11731	
East Norwich	1	Nassau County	11732	
East Oakfield	1	Genesee County	14125	
East Olean	1	Cattaraugus County	14760	
Easton	1	Washington County	12834	
Easton	1	Washington County		
East Otto	1	Cattaraugus County	14729	
East Otto	1	Cattaraugus County		
East Palermo	1	Oswego County	13036	
East Palmyra	1	Wayne County	14444	
East Park	1	Dutchess County	12538	
East Part	1	St. Lawrence County	13697	
East Patchogue	1	Suffolk County	11772	
East Pembroke	1	Genesee County	14056	
East Penfield	1	Monroe County	14450	
East Pharsalia	1	Chenango County	13758	
East Pitcairn	1	St. Lawrence County	13648	
East Pittstown	1	Rensselaer County	12028	
East Poestenkill	1	Rensselaer County	12018	
Eastport	1	Suffolk County	11941	
East Potter	1	Yates County	14527	
East Quogue	1	Suffolk County	11942	
East Randolph	1	Cattaraugus County	14730	
East Richford	1	Tioga County		
East Ripley	1	Chautauqua County	14775	
East River	1	Cortland County		
East Rochester	1	Monroe County	14445	
East Rochester	1	Monroe County		
East Rockaway	1	Nassau County	11518	
East Rodman	1	Jefferson County	13601	
East Salamanca	1	Cattaraugus County	14779	
East Salem	1	Washington County		
East Schodack	1	Rensselaer County	12063	
East Schuyler	1	Herkimer County	13340	
East Scott	1	Cortland County	13077	
East Seneca	1	Erie County	14224	
East Setauket	1	Suffolk County	11733	
East Shelby	1	Orleans County	14103	
East Shoreham	1	Suffolk County		
East Side	1	Broome County	13904	
Eastside	1	Suffolk County	11937	
East Sidney	1	Delaware County	13775	
East Springfield	1	Otsego County	13333	
East Steamburg	1	Schuyler County	14886	
East Steuben	1	Oneida County		
East Stone Arabia	1	Montgomery County	13428	
East Syracuse	1	Onondaga County	13057	
East Taghkanic	1	Columbia County		
East Township	1	Albany County		
East Tremont	1	Bronx County		
East Union	1	Steuben County		
East Varick	1	Seneca County	14541	
East Venice	1	Cayuga County	13071	
East Verona	1	Oneida County		
East Vestal	1	Broome County	13903	
East Vestal	1	Broome County	13902	
East Victor	1	Ontario County	14564	
Eastview	1	Westchester County	10595	
East Virgil	1	Cortland County		
East Walden	1	Orange County	12586	
East Watertown	1	Jefferson County	13601	
East Waverly	1	Tioga County		
East Wawarsing	1	Ulster County	12489	
East Whitehall	1	Washington County	12887	
East White Plains	1	Westchester County	10604	
East Williamson	1	Wayne County	14449	
East Williston	1	Nassau County	11596	
East Wilson	1	Niagara County	14108	
East Windham	1	Greene County	12439	
East Windsor	1	Broome County	13865	
East Winfield	1	Herkimer County	13491	
Eastwood	1	Onondaga County	13206	
East Woodhull	1	Steuben County		
East Woods	1	Westchester County		
East Worcester	1	Otsego County	12064	
Eaton	1	Madison County	13334	
Eaton	1	Madison County		
Eaton Corners	1	Madison County		
Eaton Corners	1	Schenectady County		
Eatons Neck	1	Suffolk County	11768	
Eatonville	1	Herkimer County		
Eavesport	1	Ulster County	12490	
Eben	1	St. Lawrence County	13676	
Ebenezer	1	Erie County	14224	
Ebenezer Junction	1	Erie County	14224	
Echota	1	Niagara County		
Eddy	1	St. Lawrence County	13617	
Eddy Corners	1	Saratoga County		
Eddyville	1	Cattaraugus County	14755	
Eddyville	1	Ulster County	12401	
Eden	1	Erie County	14057	
Eden	1	Erie County		
Eden	1	Orange County		
Eden Center	1	Erie County		
Eden Valley	1	Erie County		
Edenville	1	Orange County	10990	
Edenwald	1	Bronx County		
Edgemere	1	Queens County	11690	
Edgemont	1	Westchester County	10583	
Edgewater	1	Cayuga County		
Edgewater	1	Erie County		
Edgewater Beach	1	Oneida County	13308	
Edgewater Park	1	Onondaga County	13152	
Edgewater Park	1	St. Lawrence County	13669	
Edgewood	1	Greene County	12450	
Edgewood	1	Suffolk County	11717	
Edgewood Garden	1	Onondaga County	13164	
Edgewood Park	1	Jefferson County	13607	
Edicks	1	Herkimer County		
Edinburg	1	Saratoga County	12134	
Edinburg	1	Saratoga County		
Edmeston	1	Otsego County	13335	
Edmeston	1	Otsego County		
Edson	1	Broome County	13865	
Edwards	1	St. Lawrence County	13635	
Edwards	1	St. Lawrence County		
Edwards Hill	1	Warren County	12811	
Edwards Park	1	Columbia County	12029	
Edwardsville	1	St. Lawrence County	13646	
Edwin A. Link Field-Broome County Airport	1	Broome County	13902	
Egbertville	1	Richmond County	10306	
Eggertsville	1	Erie County	14226	
Egypt	1	Monroe County	14450	
Eighmyville	1	Dutchess County		
Einstein	1	Bronx County	10475	
Eisenhower College	1	Seneca County	13148	
Elayne Meadows	1	Saratoga County	12188	
Elba	1	Genesee County	14058	
Elba	1	Genesee County		
Elberta	1	Niagara County		
Elbow	1	Washington County	12887	
Elbridge	1	Onondaga County	13060	
Elbridge	1	Onondaga County		
Eldred	1	Sullivan County	12732	
Eleanor Roosevelt National Historic Site	1	Dutchess County	12538	
Elgin	1	Cattaraugus County		
Elizabethtown	1	Essex County	12932	
Elizabethtown	1	Essex County		
Elizabethtown	1	Herkimer County		
Elizaville	1	Columbia County	12523	
Elka Park	1	Greene County	12427	
Elk Brook	1	Delaware County	12776	
Elk Creek	1	Otsego County	12155	
Elkdale	1	Cattaraugus County	14779	
Elko	1	Cattaraugus County		
Ellenburg	1	Clinton County	12933	
Ellenburg	1	Clinton County		
Ellenburg	1	Clinton County		
Ellenburg Center	1	Clinton County	12934	
Ellenburg Depot	1	Clinton County	12935	
Ellenville	1	Ulster County	12428	
Ellery	1	Chautauqua County		
Ellery Center	1	Chautauqua County	14712	
Ellicott	1	Chautauqua County		
Ellicott	1	Erie County	14203	
Ellicottville	1	Cattaraugus County	14731	
Ellicottville	1	Cattaraugus County		
Ellington	1	Chautauqua County	14732	
Ellington	1	Chautauqua County		
Elliott	1	Chautauqua County	14733	
Ellis	1	Tompkins County		
Ellisburg	1	Jefferson County	13636	
Ellisburg	1	Jefferson County		
Ellis Hollow	1	Tompkins County	14850	
Ellistown	1	Tioga County	14892	
Ellwood Park	1	Erie County		
Elma	1	Erie County	14059	
Elma	1	Erie County		
Elma Center	1	Erie County		
Elm Beach	1	Seneca County		
Elmbois	1	Steuben County		
Elmcrest	1	Onondaga County		
Elmdale	1	St. Lawrence County	13642	
Elmer Hill	1	Oneida County	13440	
Elmgrove	1	Monroe County		
Elm Grove	1	Otsego County	13808	
Elmhurst	1	Chautauqua County	14701	
Elmhurst	1	Queens County	11373	
Elmhurst-A	1	Queens County	11373	
Elmira	1	Chemung County	14901	99
Elmira	1	Chemung County		
Elmira Heights	1	Chemung County	14903	
Elmira Heights North	1	Chemung County	14903	
Elmont	1	Nassau County	11003	
Elm Park	1	Richmond County	10303	
Elmsford	1	Westchester County	10523	
Elmsmere	1	Westchester County		
Elm Tree	1	Chautauqua County		
Elm Valley	1	Allegany County	14895	
Elmwood	1	Cayuga County		
Elnora	1	Saratoga County	12065	
Elpis	1	Oneida County		
Elsinore	1	Clinton County		
Elsmere	1	Albany County	12054	
Elsmere	1	Westchester County		
Elting Corners	1	Ulster County		
Eltingville	1	Richmond County	10312	
Elton	1	Cattaraugus County	14042	
Elwood	1	Suffolk County	11731	
Elwood	1	Suffolk County	11731	
Elwood Farms	1	Suffolk County	11731	
Embarkation	1	Kings County	11250	
Embogcht	1	Greene County	12414	
Emerald Green	1	Sullivan County		
Emerson	1	Cayuga County	13140	
Emerson Hill	1	Richmond County		
Emeryville	1	St. Lawrence County	13642	
Eminence	1	Schoharie County	12175	
Emmons	1	Otsego County	13820	
Emmonsburg	1	Fulton County		
Empeyville	1	Oneida County	13316	
Empire State	1	New York County	10118	
Empire State Plaza	1	Albany County	12220	
Endicott	1	Broome County	13760	
Endwell	1	Broome County	13760	
Enfield	1	Tompkins County	14850	
Enfield	1	Tompkins County		
Enfield Center	1	Tompkins County		
Engleville	1	Schoharie County		
Englewood	1	Erie County	14223	
Ennerdale	1	Ontario County		
Ensenore	1	Cayuga County	13118	
Ephratah	1	Fulton County	13339	
Ephratah	1	Fulton County		
Eppie Corners	1	Fulton County		
Erieville	1	Madison County	13061	
Erin	1	Chemung County	14838	
Erin	1	Chemung County		
Erwin	1	Steuben County		
Erwins	1	Steuben County	14870	
Escarpment	1	Niagara County	14092	
Esopus	1	Ulster County	12429	
Esopus	1	Ulster County		
Esperance	1	Schenectady County		
Esperance	1	Schoharie County	12066	
Esperance	1	Schoharie County		
Esplanade	1	Bronx County	10469	
Essex	1	Essex County		
Essex	1	Essex County	12936	
Essex	1	Essex County		
Etna	1	Tompkins County	13062	
Euclid	1	Onondaga County	13041	
Evans	1	Erie County		
Evans Center	1	Erie County	14006	
Evans Mills	1	Jefferson County	13637	
Evergreen	1	Queens County		
Excelsior Springs	1	Livingston County		
Exeter	1	Otsego County		
Exeter Center	1	Otsego County	13315	
Exeter Corner	1	Otsego County		
