= Steve Geltz =

American baseball player (born 1987)

Steven Geltz
- Pitcher
- Born: November 1, 1987 (age 37); Wilson, New York, U.S.
- Batted: Right Threw: Right

MLB debut
- August 16, 2012, for the Los Angeles Angels of Anaheim

Last MLB appearance
- September 27, 2016, for the Tampa Bay Rays

MLB statistics
- Win–loss record: 2–9
- Earned run average: 4.23
- Strikeouts: 99
- Stats at Baseball Reference

Teams
- Los Angeles Angels of Anaheim (2012); Tampa Bay Rays (2014–2016)

Steven Andrew Geltz (born November 1, 1987) is an American former professional baseball pitcher. He played in Major League Baseball (MLB) for the Los Angeles Angels of Anaheim and Tampa Bay Rays.

== Amateur career ==
Geltz was born in Newfane, New York to Roxanne, a registered nurse, and John, an electrician. As a child growing up in Western New York, Geltz practiced his pitching motion and releases by throwing hockey pucks. He was raised in Ransomville, New York and attended Wilson High School in Wilson, New York. Only 5'9" as a senior in high school, Geltz was overlooked by most college baseball programs and all Major League Baseball clubs despite his talents as a pitcher, and attended nearby University at Buffalo. As a freshman in 2006, Geltz set a school record with six saves in a single season.

== Professional career ==
=== Los Angeles Angels ===
Geltz was not drafted out of college but caught the attention of scouts in 2008 while pitching for the Torrington Twisters of the New England Collegiate Baseball League, a collegiate summer baseball league, in a blowout loss against the United States national collegiate baseball team. Geltz signed with the Los Angeles Angels of Anaheim and was assigned to the Orem Owlz.

Geltz was called up to the majors for the first time on August 10, 2012.

=== Tampa Bay Rays ===
Before the 2013 season, the Angels traded Geltz to the Tampa Bay Rays for pitcher Dane De La Rosa. Geltz spent all of 2013 in the International League with the Durham Bulls.

In May 2014, Geltz received a 50-game suspension without pay after testing positive for a drug of abuse for the second time in his career in violation of the Minor League Drug Prevention and Treatment Program. The positive test was a result of recreational marijuana use during the offseason.

Geltz pitched his first full Major League season in 2015. On April 14, Geltz faced four Toronto Blue Jays batters and got four outs for his first Major League win. On April 22 against the Boston Red Sox, Geltz picked up his first save in the Major Leagues. Geltz set a Rays franchise record later in the season by retiring 32 batters in a row. He lost the streak on June 24 by allowing an extra-inning single to Ezequiel Carrera.

=== Los Angeles Dodgers ===
Geltz was claimed off waivers by the Milwaukee Brewers on November 28, 2016. He was removed from the 40-man roster and sent outright to the Triple-A Nashville Sounds to the minors on December 3, but rejected the assignment and elected free agency.

On January 3, 2017, Geltz signed a minor league contract with the Los Angeles Dodgers organization. He was assigned to the Triple-A Oklahoma City Dodgers to begin the season. In 23 games, he was 2–2 with a 2.67 ERA. He elected free agency following the season on November 6.

=== Philadelphia Phillies ===
On January 2, 2018, Geltz signed a minor league contract with the Philadelphia Phillies. Before the season, he was suspended 100 games for his third positive test for a drug of abuse. Geltz was released by the organization on August 15.
