= Wilson (village), New York =

Wilson
- Village
- Village of Wilson
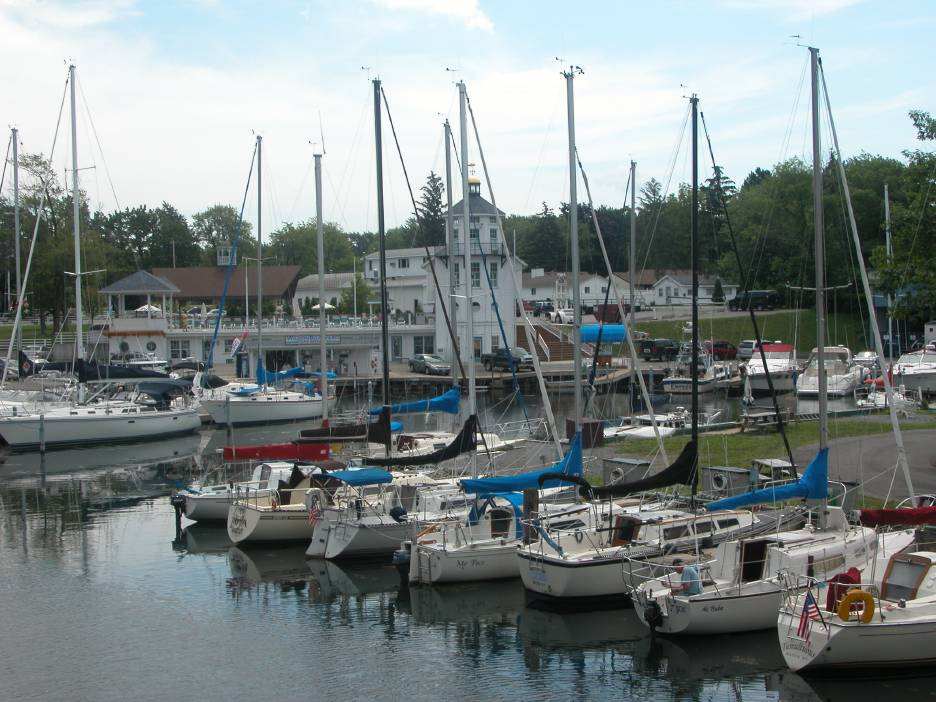

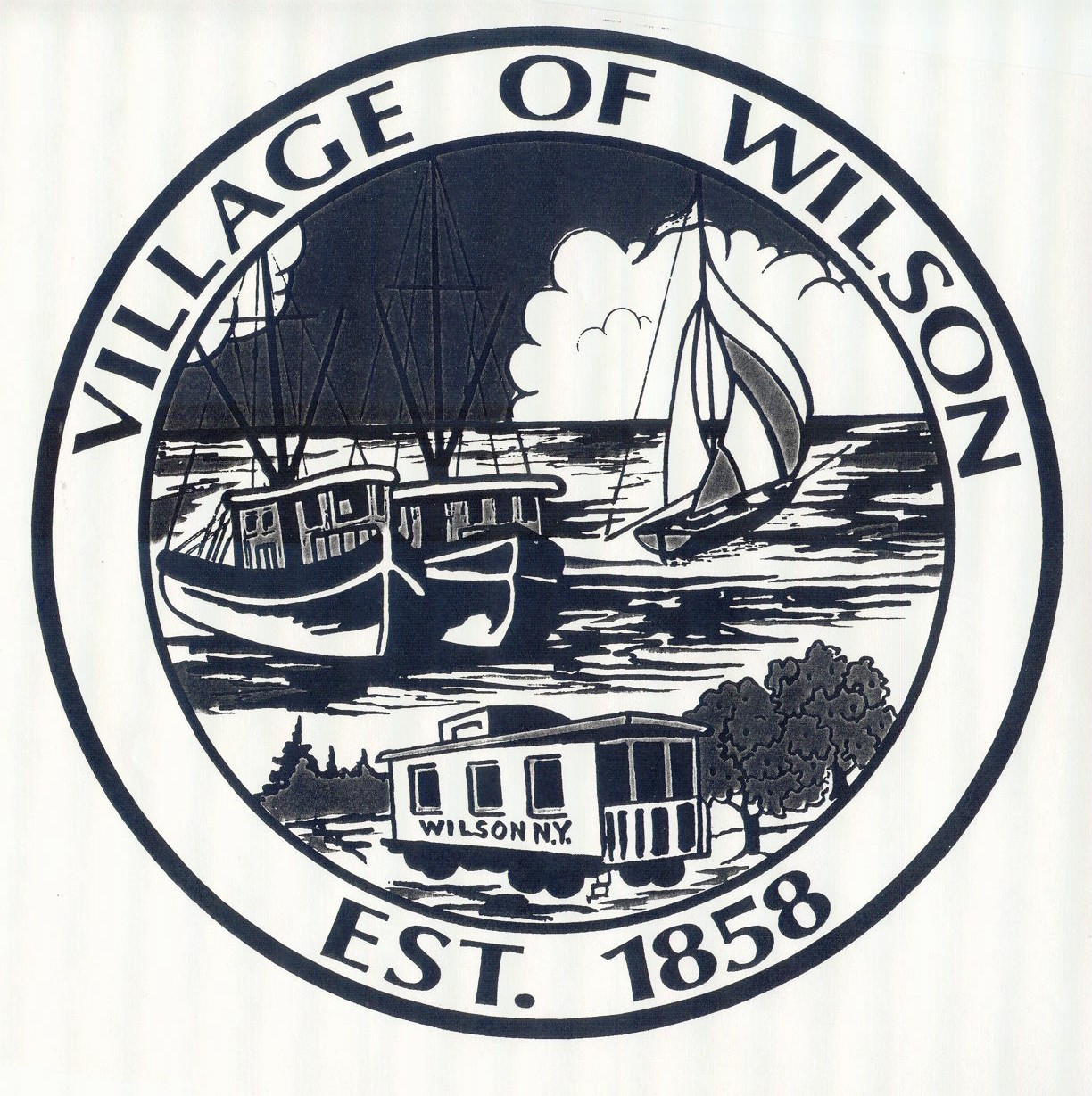
- Seal
- Motto: Let Each Live in Harmony with Earth, Sea, and One Another
- Location in Niagara County and the state of New York.

- Location within New York
- Coordinates: 43°17′36″N 78°50′32″W
- Country: United States
- State: New York
- County: Niagara
- Named for: Luther Wilson

Area
  - Total: 1.00 sq mi (2.60 km^{2})
  - Land: 0.81 sq mi (2.11 km^{2})
  - Water: 0.19 sq mi (0.49 km^{2})
- Elevation: 344 ft (105 m)

Population (2020)
  - Total: 1,247
  - Density: 1,533.6/sq mi (592.14/km^{2})
- Time zone: UTC-5 (Eastern (EST))
  - Summer (DST): UTC-4 (EDT)
- ZIP code: 14172
- Area code: 716
- FIPS code: 36-82359
- GNIS feature ID: 971408
- Website: Village of Wilson

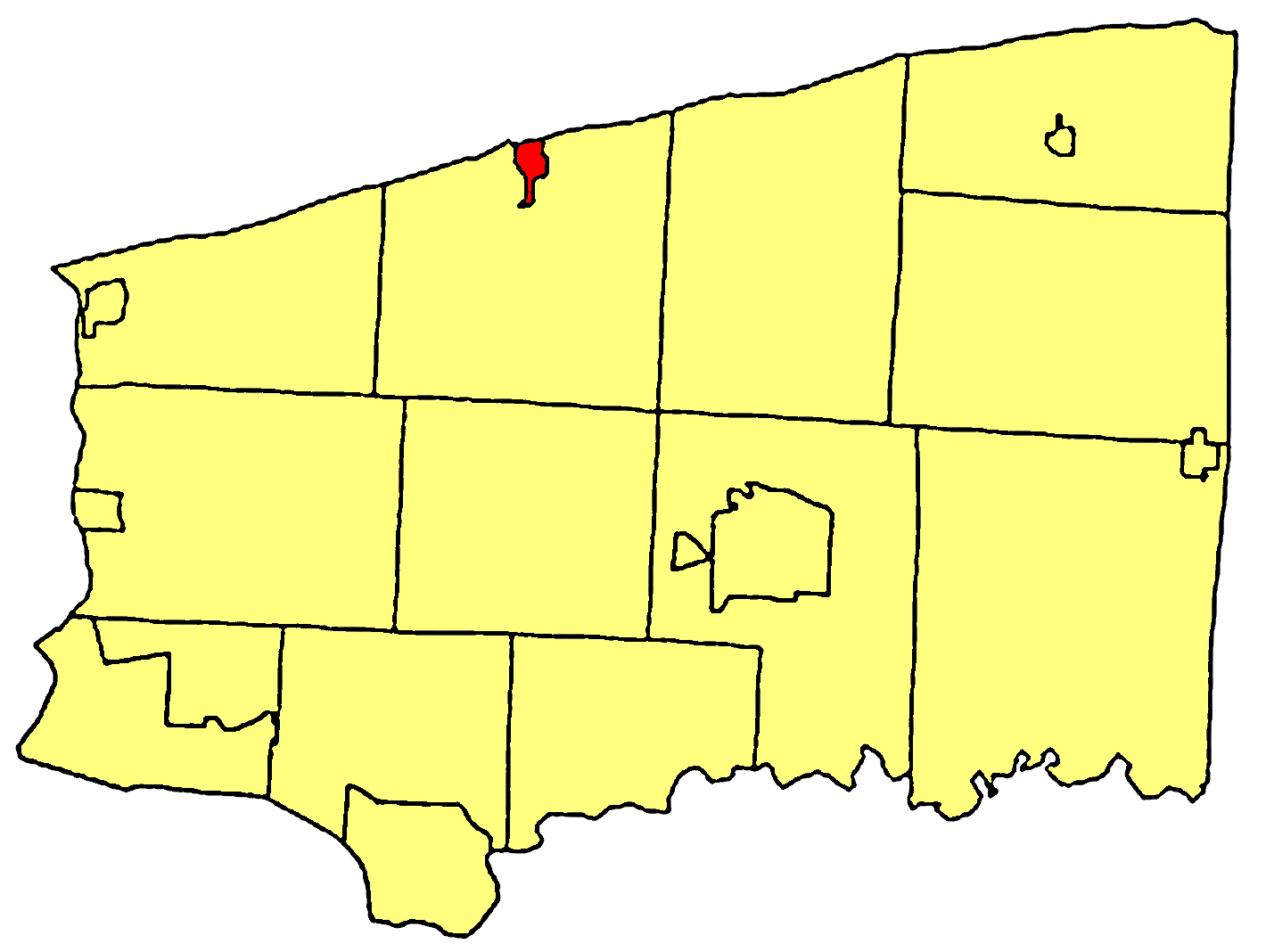
Location within Niagara County.

Wilson is a village in Niagara County, New York, United States. The population was 1,264 at the 2010 census. The village is said to be named after Luther Wilson. It is part of the Buffalo–Niagara Falls Metropolitan Statistical Area.

The Village of Wilson is within the Town of Wilson in the northern part of the county. It was incorporated on May 11, 1858. The village has a small boat harbor for Lake Ontario that includes several marinas and boat launching facilities. Wilson Harbor and its surrounding area boasts some of the best bass, trout, and salmon fishing in Western New York.

== History ==
The Village of Wilson was incorporated in 1858. It was named for Luther Wilson, the son of Reuben Wilson, who was the founder of the town of Wilson. Luther Wilson's first claim to ingenuity may have occurred during the War of 1812 when he was only 14 years of age. According to early accounts, George Ash, who lived west of the Wilson settlement, warned the settlers that the British were coming, thus giving them time to gather their things and flee. About 25 head of cattle were rounded up, and Luther Wilson was given the responsibility of driving them eastward along the lake, some had cow bells around their necks, so in order to keep invaders from hearing them, he stuffed dry leaves in the bells. He was then able to drive the cattle five miles (8.0 km) beyond Van Horne's Mill where they remained undetected. After the British burned down the mill and retreated, Luther drove the cattle back to Wilson. When Luther reached maturity, he became a business man, and started most of the public improvements in town.

In 1827, he started the hamlet of Wilson, NY by laying out a single tier of lots along the north side of Young Street from Lake Street to the Creek. In 1829, a tavern was added to his father's store and post office at the west end of Young Street which was often visited by the early settlers and soldiers from Old Fort Niagara. In 1834, Luther and his father built the cobblestone "Ontario House" on the southwest corner of Young and Lake streets, and up to 1894 (when it was destroyed by fire), it was considered one of Wilson's oldest and best known hostelries. On December 28, 1835, Luther was elected one of the trustees of the first Methodist-Episcopal Society in the town of Wilson at a meeting held to incorporate it. In 1838, a new frame church was built at the corner of Lake and High streets on land acquired from Andrew Brown. Up to 1837, Luther helped his father as a merchant and miller, and in that same year, enlarged the grist mill by adding steam power and two more run of stones. In 1844–45, Luther built a cobblestone home on the site of the first log school-house built in the village in 1820. This historic home is today known as the "Wilson House." It was during this year that Luther was elected to a term in the state assembly.

In 1846, Luther Wilson established the harbor and obtained permission from the Secretary of War to build two 200-foot (61 m) piers into the lake at the mouth of 12-mile (19 km) creek. For the next 20 years, at his own expense, he dredged the channel by the use of horsepower, and continued to make improvements until 1867 when the Wilson Harbor Company was incorporated. Other improvements included a large store house where he began buying and shipping grain and fruit. He also built a new shipyard where he built the schooner, Reuben F. Wilson, which he named for his son. That was the start of a new industry in Wilson. Up to 1875, about 20 two-and-three-masted schooners were built at the harbor by itinerant contractors. Luther was also responsible for having Congress declare Wilson a Port of Entry in 1848 and Abram Vosburgh was named the first collector.

The village of Wilson was incorporated May 11, 1858, by an act of the state legislature. At the time, it included 416 acres (1.68 km^{2}) within its borders and a population of 715 persons. Luther was elected to serve as the first president of the board of directors. When the R.W. & O. Railroad came through Wilson in 1875, it was surveyed through the center of Wilson's former cemetery which was located directly east of present depot-museum. Luther donated 8 acres (32,000 m^{2}) of land near 12-mile (19 km) creek for a new cemetery. When his remains, among others were removed from the burial site, they were placed in the new "Greenwood Cemetery." Luther was interested in the military, and for a number of years served as a captain of the Wilson Artillery Company of the 66th regiment, New York State Militia.

He was associated with the work of the Methodist-Episcopal church in Wilson, but also gave land on which the first frame Presbyterian Church, first Baptist Church and North Ridge Methodist-Episcopal churches were built. Luther Wilson was said to be loved and respected by all. He died in Wilson in 1890 at the age of 92. He was interred in the cemetery that he started - Greenwood.

In the American Civil War, a Wilson native, Ira S. Pettit, enlisted for the Union Army. He died in 1864 in the Andersonville Prison of scurvy. His personal diary was given to his father after his death and eventually published.

Since 1818 many Wilson men from the Town and Village have given their lives in defense of their country. Wilson lost 50 men in the Civil War, 6 in World War I; 28 in World War II; 3 in the Korean War, and 5 in the Vietnam War.

== Geography ==
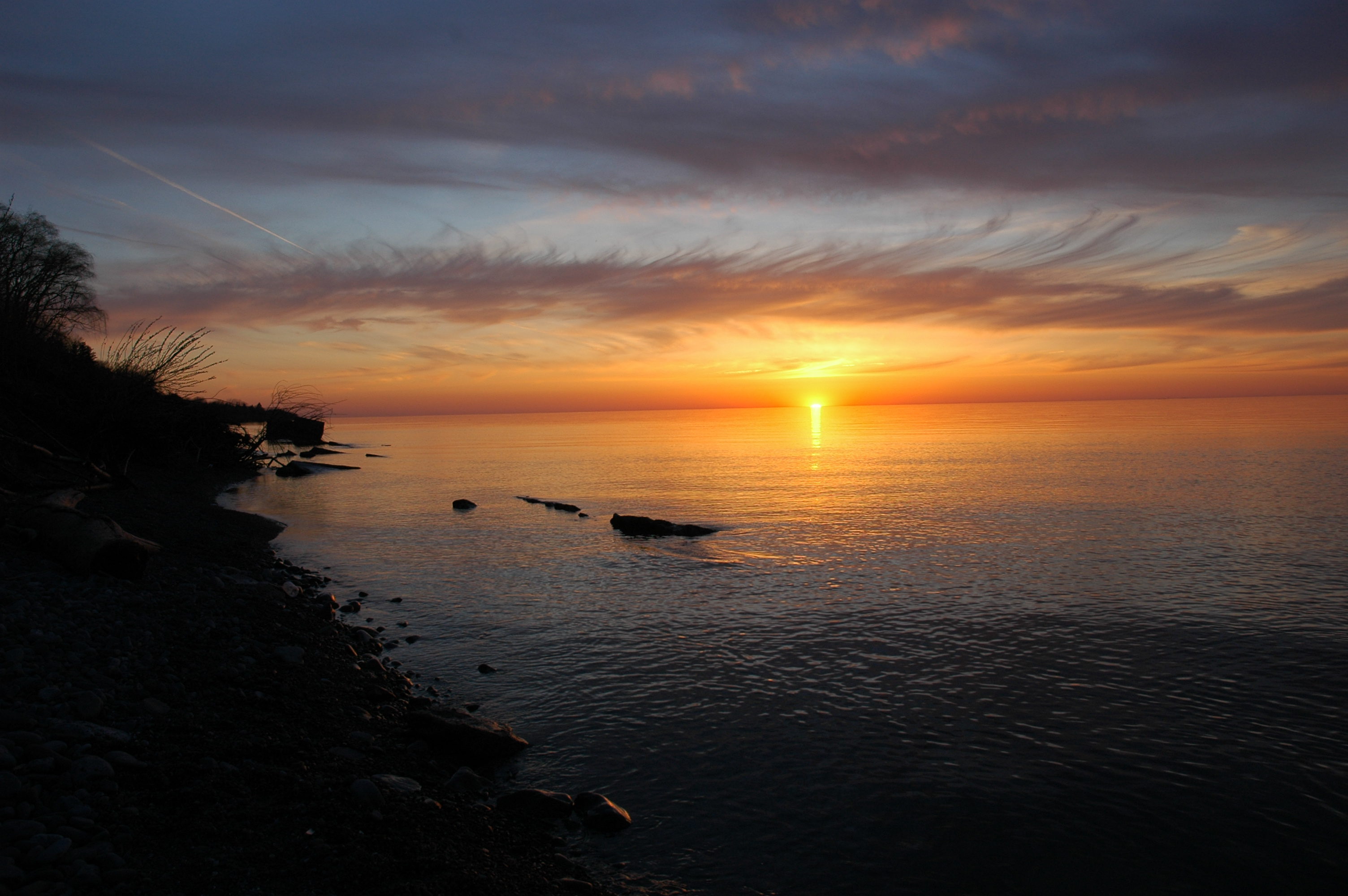
Wilson-Tuscarora State Park

According to the United States Census Bureau, the village has a total area of 1.0 square mile (2.6 km^{2}), of which 0.8 square miles (2.1 km^{2}) is land and 0.2 square miles (0.52 km^{2}) (18.00%) is water.

Wilson is located at the junction of New York State Route 18 (Harbor Street/Sunset Street/Ontario Street) and New York State Route 425 (Lake Street) and is east of the mouth of Twelve Mile Creek. Wilson-Tuscarora State Park is on the western side of the village. This park offers picnicking, canoeing, swimming, playgrounds, and hiking trails.

The village is located on the south shore of Lake Ontario. On a clear day, it is possible to see the skyscrapers of Toronto across the lake in Canada, including the CN Tower, just over 30 miles away.

=== Sunset Island ===
Sunset Island forms the northern border of Wilson Harbor and is only seasonally inhabited. The island is primarily accessible by boat. At the eastern wider end of the island is a large common area for games or picnics. There is an unmanned mini store / library, called the "Fire House" because it also houses the fire alarm, fire fighting equipment and defibrillator. There is also one large round building known as the "Colony Hall", which is used for meetings and parties.

Sunset Island is not an island but actually two islands connected by a narrow spit of land. This spit, between the smaller western island and its larger sister to the east, has on occasion been washed away by lake storms isolating East Sunset Island. The western smaller island is connected to the mainland and accessible through Tuscarora State Park by a path, hence boat access is the primary means of access. In recent times, some lakeside homes had to be moved inward because of erosion. In the late 1800s and early 1900s there were some hotels on the island which have long since been lost to fire, storms and time".

== Demographics ==
Historical population
Census	Pop.	Note	%±
1870	661		—
1880	662		0.2%
1890	683		3.2%
1900	612		−10.4%
1910	655		7.0%
1920	631		−3.7%
1930	660		4.6%
1940	849		28.6%
1950	962		13.3%
1960	1,320		37.2%
1970	1,284		−2.7%
1980	1,259		−1.9%
1990	1,307		3.8%
2000	1,213		−7.2%
2010	1,264		4.2%
2020	1,247		−1.3%
U.S. Decennial Census

As of the census of 2000, there were 1,213 people, 505 households, and 348 families residing in the village. The population density was 1,474.5 inhabitants per square mile (569.3/km^{2}). There were 537 housing units at an average density of 252.8 persons per square kilometre (655 persons/mi^{2}). The racial makeup of the village was 98.93% White, 0.33% African American, 0.08% Native American, 0.08% Asian, 0.08% Pacific Islander, 0.08% from other races, and 0.41% from two or more races. 0.49% of the population were Hispanic or Latino of any race.

There were 505 households, out of which 31.5% had children under the age of 18 living with them, 57.6% were married couples living together, 7.1% have a woman whose husband does not live with her, and 30.9% were non-families. 28.1% of all households were made up of individuals, and 14.5% had someone living alone who was 65 years of age or older. The average household size was 2.40 and the average family size was 2.95.

In the village, the population was spread out, with 24.1% under the age of 18, 5.5% from 18 to 24, 25.1% from 25 to 44, 27.9% from 45 to 64, and 17.3% who were 65 years of age or older. The median age was 41 years. For every 100 females, there were 92.8 males. For every 100 females age 18 and over, there were 87.6 males.

The median income for a household in the village was $36,534, and the median income for a family was $42,656. Males had a median income of $37,692 versus $22,419 for females. The per capita income for the village was $19,175. 4.6% of the population and 3.7% of families were below the poverty line. Out of the total people living in poverty, 5.2% are under the age of 18 and 1.4% are 65 or older.

== Education ==
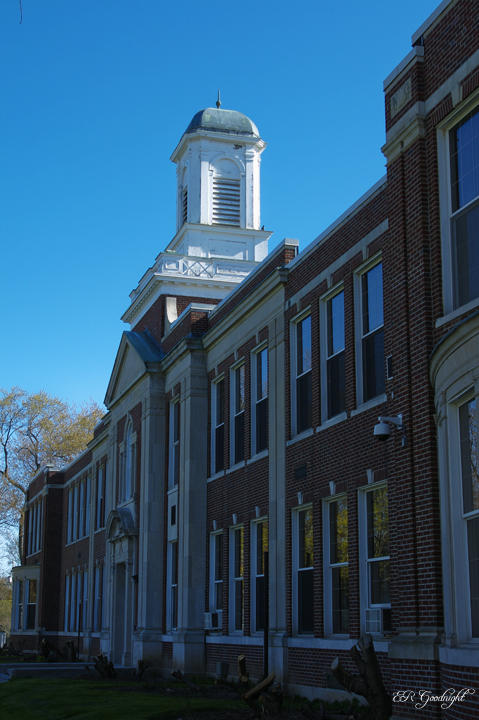
Wilson High School

A Collegiate Institute was started in Wilson in 1845 and incorporated on February 19, 1846. It was decided that circulars would be sent out to advertise the new school, and they proved very successful. When the doors opened in the fall of 1846, 339 applicants had applied for admission. Over 60% of those applicants were non-residents. Applications came from Mississippi, Kentucky, Ohio, Illinois, Massachusetts, Pennsylvania, Michigan and Canada. Moral standards were very high at the school, and all pupils were required to attend church every Sunday and to be in their rooms at 7:30 pm except on Fridays evenings which were reserved for social activities.

As other schools were built, attendance dropped off in Wilson, and by 1869, tuition money was inadequate to maintain the school and it became necessary to apply to the State for aid. A proposal was made to unite four districts to form a Wilson Union Free School, but it met with great objections—especially from the outlying districts. In fact, feelings ran so high many people would not trade with merchants that advocated "such an asinine project that would allow persons to be taxed to support a free school". When it came time to vote, it resulted in a tie, so one enterprising gentleman, Reuben F. Wilson, asked Elder Garfield (who loved to talk) to get up and make a speech in favor of the free school. While Garfield rambled on and on, Mr. Wilson hitched up his horse and buggy and raced to the harbor and asked Captain Bunn to get off his boat and accompany him back to the school. Captain Bunn voted "yes" and the Wilson Union Free School was born. The Union Free School was transformed into Wilson High School in around 1900. The Union Free School's use was greatly reduced in 1935, when the current high school building was built across the street. The school was used to hold a few classes until 1956; it was destroyed by fire in 1957. Today, the Wilson Town Hall stands where the Union Free school once did.

Today, Wilson is a centralized public school system with a total student population of approximately 1700. The system is composed of Wilson Elementary, Wilson Central Middle School, and Wilson High School. It is located in a rural area approximately 30 miles (48 km) north of Buffalo, 25 miles (40 km) northeast of Niagara Falls, and adjacent to the city of Lockport. The District encompasses an area of 144 square miles (370 km^{2}) including Wilson and portions of Ransomville, Youngstown, Newfane, Cambria, Lockport and Porter.

== Notable people ==
- DeWitt Bristol Brace (1859–1905), physicist, born in Wilson.
- Earl Brydges, former New York State Senator; lived in Wilson.
- Frank A. Cipolla, Brigadier General, born in Wilson.
- Virginia Dox (1851–1941), frontier educator and lecturer, born in Wilson.
- Rexford Guy Tugwell (1891–1979), member of FDR's "Brains Trust", later Governor of Puerto Rico, grew up in Wilson.
