= Milo Goodrich =

American politician

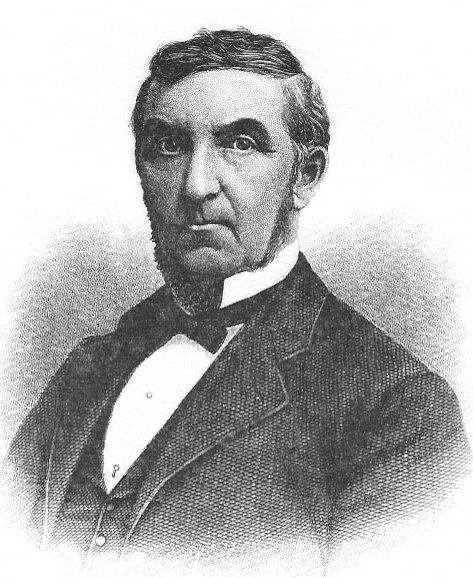

Member of the U.S. House of Representatives from New York
- In office March 4, 1871 – March 3, 1873
- Preceded by: Giles W. Hotchkiss
- Succeeded by: William H. Lamport
- Constituency: 26th district

Personal details
- Born: January 3, 1814 East Homer, New York, U.S.
- Died: April 15, 1881 (aged 67) Auburn, New York, U.S.

Milo Goodrich (January 3, 1814 – April 15, 1881) was a United States representative from New York. Born in East Homer, Cortland County, he moved with his parents to Cortlandville in 1816. He attended the South Cortland district school, Cortland Academy (in Homer) and Oberlin College in Ohio. He taught school in New York, Pennsylvania, and Ohio, studied law, was admitted to the bar in Worcester, Massachusetts in 1840, and practiced for two years in Beloit, Wisconsin. He returned to New York and settled in Dryden in 1844. He was postmaster of Dryden from October 2, 1849, to June 25, 1853, and was a member of the New York Constitutional Convention in 1867 and 1868.

Goodrich was elected as a Republican to the Forty-second Congress, holding office from March 4, 1871, to March 3, 1873. He was an unsuccessful candidate for reelection in 1872 to the Forty-third Congress, and resumed the practice of law. He moved to Auburn, New York in 1875 and continued the practice of law; he died there in 1881. Interment was in Green Hills Cemetery, Dryden.

He is the great-great-great-grandfather of U.S. Secretary of Education Arne Duncan.

U.S. House of Representatives
Preceded by Giles W. Hotchkiss	Member of the U.S. House of Representatives from New York's 26th congressional district 1871–1873	Succeeded by William H. Lamport
