= Roosevelt Beach =

Roosevelt Beach may refer to:

- Roosevelt Beach, New York, US
- Naples Beach, also known as Roosevelt Beach, at Half Moon Bay State Beach, California, US
- Roosevelt Beach, Oregon, US 44.1748431°N 124.1140086°W
- Roosevelt Beach, Washington, US 47.1761959°N 124.1954562°W
