= William S. Lincoln =

American politician (1813–1893)

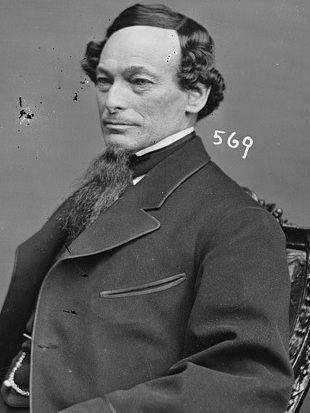
- Lincoln in 1867

Member of the U.S. House of Representatives from New York's 26th district
- In office March 4, 1867 – March 3, 1869
- Preceded by: Giles W. Hotchkiss
- Succeeded by: William H. Lamport

Personal details
- Born: William Slosson Lincoln; August 13, 1813 Berkshire, New York, U.S.
- Died: April 21, 1893 (aged 79) Washington, D.C., U.S.
- Resting place: Oak Hill Cemetery; Washington, D.C., U.S.
- Party: Democratic; Republican
- Spouse: Helen Burbank
- Children: 1
- Occupation: Politician; lawyer

William Slosson Lincoln (August 13, 1813 – April 21, 1893) was a U.S. representative from New York.

== Early life ==
William Slosson Lincoln was born on August 13, 1813, in Berkshire (now Newark Valley), Tioga County, New York, to Otis Lincoln. His father owner a lumber business, saw and grist mills and a tannery. Lincoln attended the common schools. He studied law and was admitted to the bar.

== Career ==
Lincoln worked in mercantile, lumbering and tanning businesses with his father.

He was postmaster of Newark Valley from September 20, 1838, to February 24, 1841, and from December 19, 1844, to September 19, 1866. He served as supervisor in 1841, 1844, 1865, and 1866. He was justice of the peace in 1852 and 1855.

Lincoln was a Democrat prior to the war. He was elected as a Republican to the Fortieth Congress from March 4, 1867, to March 3, 1869. He was not a candidate for reelection. He engaged in the practice of law in Washington, D.C., until his death.

== Personal life ==
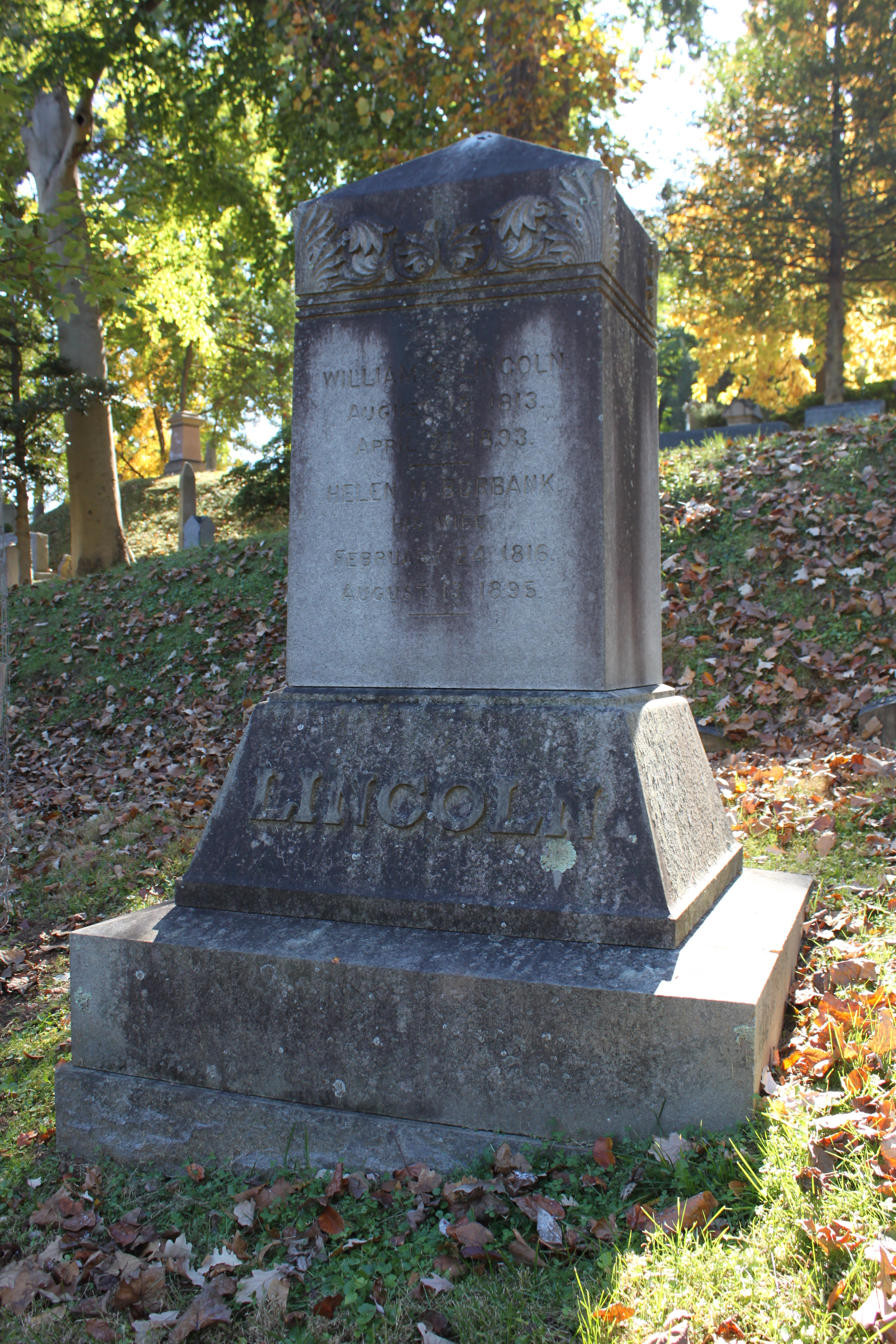
Grave of Lincoln at Oak Hill Cemetery

Lincoln married Helen Burbank. They had one daughter, Mrs. Sidney A. Kent.

Lincoln died on April 21, 1893, at his home at 1714 Massachusetts Avenue in Washington, D.C. He was interred in Oak Hill Cemetery in Washington, D.C.

== Sources ==
- United States Congress. "William S. Lincoln (id: L000317)". Biographical Directory of the United States Congress.

U.S. House of Representatives
Preceded by Giles W. Hotchkiss	Member of the U.S. House of Representatives from New York's 26th congressional district March 4, 1867 – March 3, 1869	Succeeded by Giles W. Hotchkiss
