= Pleasant Corners, New York =

Hamlet in New York, United States

Coordinates: 43°15′53″N 78°49′33″W

Pleasant Corners is a hamlet in the town of Wilson in Niagara County, New York, United States.
