= Coolidge Beach, New York =

Hamlet in Niagara County, New York, US

Coordinates: 43°18′21″N 78°52′02″W

Coolidge Beach is a hamlet in the town of Wilson in Niagara County, New York, United States. It is named for Calvin Coolidge, the 30th President of the United States.
