= Emory B. Pottle =

American politician

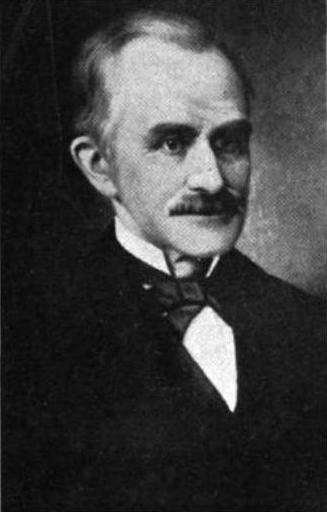
- From 1911's A History of Ontario County, New York

Member of the United States House of Representatives
- In office March 4, 1857 – March 3, 1861
- Preceded by: Andrew Oliver
- Succeeded by: Jacob P. Chamberlain
- Constituency: New York's 26th congressional district

Member of the New York State Assembly
- In office January 1, 1847 – December 31, 1847 Serving with Ezra Pierce
- Preceded by: Elias Cost, Joseph C. Shelton, Alvah Worden
- Succeeded by: Charles S. Brother, Hiram Ashley
- Constituency: Ontario County

Personal details
- Born: July 4, 1815 Naples, New York, U.S.
- Died: April 18, 1891 (aged 75) Naples, New York, U.S.
- Resting place: Rose Ridge Cemetery, Naples, New York, U.S.
- Party: Republican (from 1856)
- Other political affiliations: Whig (before 1856)
- Spouse: Catherine S. Maxfield (m. 1847)
- Children: 5
- Profession: Attorney

Emory Bemsley Pottle (July 4, 1815 – April 18, 1891) was an American attorney from Naples, New York. Active in politics as first a Whig, and later a Republican, he served in the New York State Assembly in 1847, and was a member of the United States House of Representatives from 1857 to 1861.

== Early life ==
Pottle was born in Naples, New York on July 4, 1815, a son of Loring Pottle and Betsey (Kibbe) Pottle. He pursued classical studies at Penn Yan (New York) Academy. Pottle studied law with the firm of Sibley & Worden in Canandaigua, New York, was admitted to the bar in New York City in 1838 and commenced practice in Springfield, Ohio. He then returned to Naples and continued the practice of law. Active in politics as a Whig, he served as a member of the New York State Assembly in 1847.

== Career ==
Pottle had interests in several businesses, including serving as president of the Geneva, Hornellsville, and Pine Creek Railroad, and the Geneva and Southwestern Railroad. Pottle also raised sheep and maintained vineyards, and served as president of the New York State Grape Growers Association and secretary of the National Wool Growers Association. Pottle was interested in education, and served as president of the board of trustees of the Naples Academy.

== U.S. Congressman ==
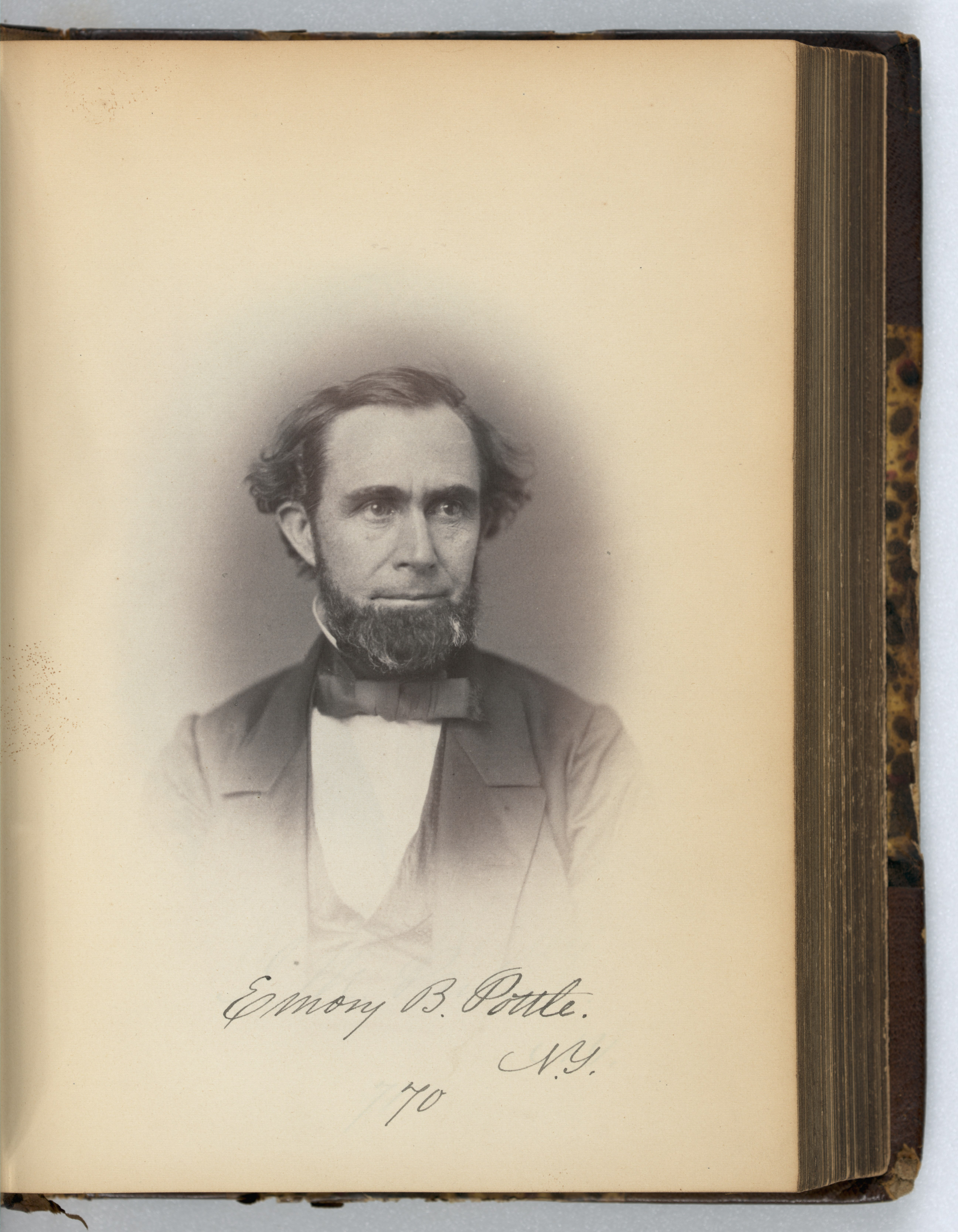
From 1859's McClees' Gallery of Photographic Portraits of the Senators, Representatives & Delegates of the Thirty-fifth Congress

Pottle became a Republican when the party was founded in the mid-1850s. He was a successful Republican nominee for the United States House of Representatives in 1856, and he was re-elected in 1858 and served in the 35th and 36th Congresses, March 4, 1857 to March 3, 1861. During his congressional service, Pottle served on the Committee on Expenditures in the Navy Department (35th Congress), and the Committee on Naval Affairs (36th Congress).

Pottle was an opponent of slavery, but argued that the U.S. Constitution sanctioned it, so the federal government could not prohibit it. In arguing that the issue needed to be resolved by the states, Pottle accused Southern slaveowners of falsely calling Republicans abolitionists and actively preventing news on the Republican position from reaching the South. Pottle also warned that of the South attempted to secede, the Northern states would be compelled to enforce the constitution, even if civil war resulted.

== Later life ==
After leaving Congress, Pottle resumed practicing law in Naples and was appointed by President Abraham Lincoln to serve on a commission which prepared a bill for a tariff on wool. In 1872, Pottle joined the Liberal Republican Party, a movement of Republicans who opposed the corruption of Ulysses S. Grant's administration and supported Horace Greeley for president. By 1876, he had returned to the regular Republican fold, and was chosen as a delegate to the state Republican convention.

In 1880, Pottle supported James A. Garfield for president and was a featured speaker at an October Republican mass meeting in Cohocton. Pottle was a supporter of James G. Blaine for president in 1884, and had a leadership role in the Ontario County Blaine and Logan organization. He was a noted orator, and was frequently called upon to speak at Independence Day celebrations, Decoration Day commemorations, and other events.

Pottle died in Naples on April 18, 1891. He was interred in Rose Ridge Cemetery.

U.S. House of Representatives
Preceded by Andrew Oliver	Member of the U.S. House of Representatives from New York's 26th congressional district 1857–1861	Succeeded by Jacob P. Chamberlain
