= Morse Cobblestone Farmhouse =

Historic house in New York, United States

- U.S. National Register of Historic Places
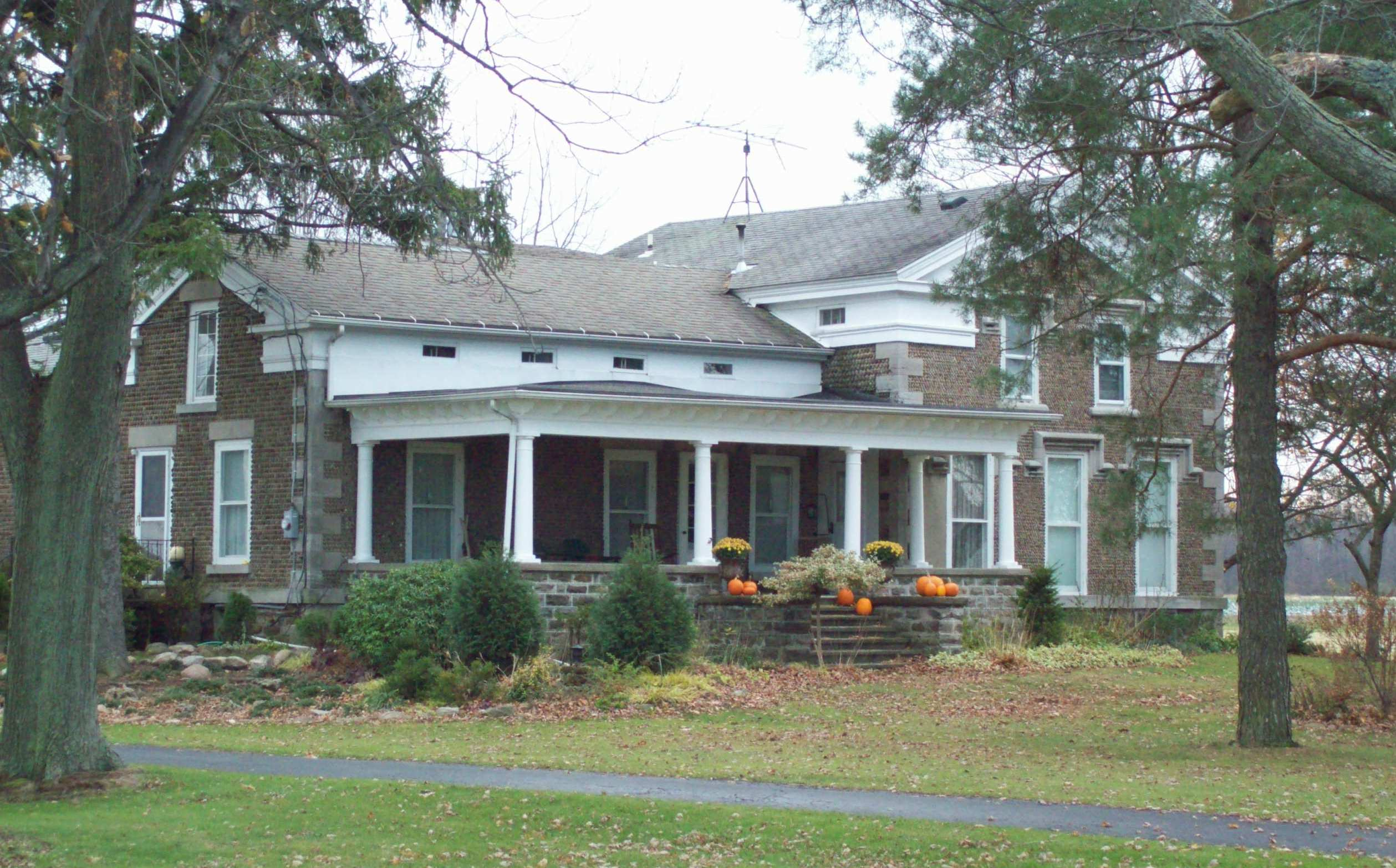
- Morse Cobblestone Farmhouse, November 2010

- Location within New York Location within the United States
- Location: 2773 Maple Road, Wilson, New York
- Coordinates: 43°16′51″N 78°48′0″W
- Area: 10 acres (4.0 ha)
- Built: 1840
- Architectural style: Greek Revival
- MPS: Cobblestone Architecture of New York State MPS
- NRHP reference No.: 10000591
- Added to NRHP: August 30, 2010

Morse Cobblestone Farmhouse is a historic home and farm complex located at Wilson in Niagara County, New York. It was constructed between about 1840 and 1845. It is an L-shaped cobblestone building with a 2-story, three-bay-wide main block and 1 1/2-story, four-bay side block and rear kitchen block in the Greek Revival style. It has a porch along the side wing added about 1910. It features irregularly shaped, variously colored cobbles in its construction. It is one of approximately 47 cobblestone structures in Niagara County. Also on the property are two fieldstone barns.

It was listed on the National Register of Historic Places in 2010.
