= Clinton D. MacDougall =

American politician

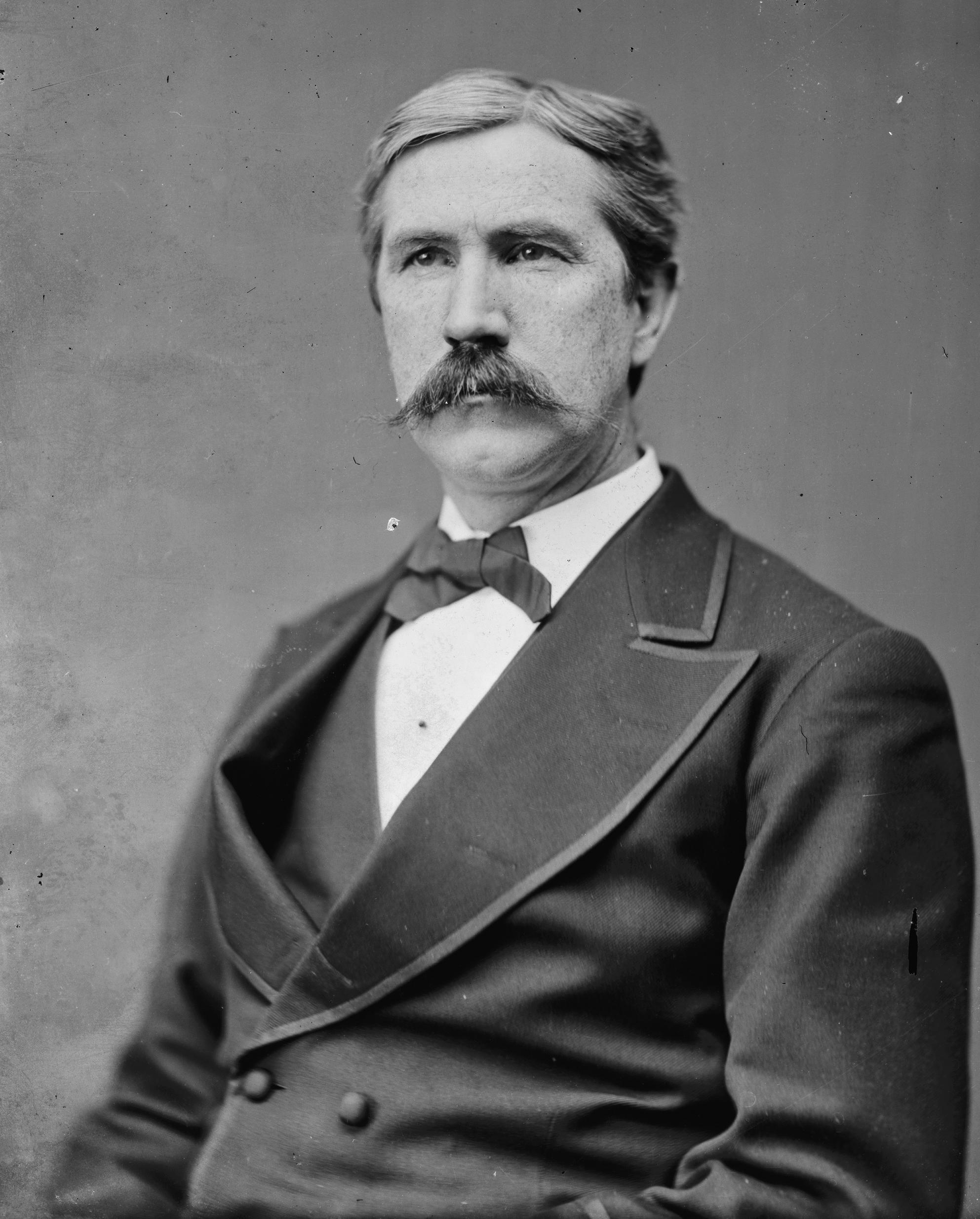

Member of the U.S. House of Representatives from New York
- In office March 4, 1873 – March 3, 1877
- Preceded by: William H. Lamport
- Succeeded by: John H. Camp
- Constituency: 25th district (1873–75); 26th district (1875–77)

Personal details
- Born: Clinton Dugald MacDougall; June 14, 1839 Glasgow, Scotland, U.K.
- Died: May 24, 1914 (aged 74) Paris, France
- Resting place: Arlington National Cemetery
- Party: Republican

Clinton Dugald MacDougall (June 14, 1839 – May 24, 1914) was a United States representative from New York.

== Life and career ==
Born near Glasgow, Scotland, he immigrated to Canada in 1842 with his parents, who later settled in Auburn, New York. He pursued an academic course, studied law, and engaged in banking from 1856 to 1869. He was commissioned captain in the 75th New York Volunteer Infantry on September 16, 1861; lieutenant colonel of the 111th New York Volunteer Infantry Regiment, August 20, 1862; colonel January 3, 1863; and brevet brigadier general of Volunteers February 25, 1865. He was honorably mustered out on June 4, 1865. In 1869 he was appointed postmaster of Auburn.

MacDougall was elected as a Republican to the Forty-third and Forty-fourth Congresses, holding office from March 4, 1873 to March 3, 1877. He represented New York's 25th congressional district and New York's 26th congressional district. Along with Gerry W. Hazelton of Wisconsin, he introduced a bill (H.R. 2711/3786) providing that Harriet Tubman be paid "the sum of $2,000 for services rendered by her to the Union Army as scout, nurse, and spy". It was defeated. He was an unsuccessful candidate for renomination in 1876. He served as United States Marshal of the northern judicial district of New York from 1877 to 1885 and from 1901 to 1910. He died in Paris, France in 1914; interment was in Arlington National Cemetery.

U.S. House of Representatives
| Preceded by William H. Lamport | Member of the U.S. House of Representatives from New York's 25th congressional district March 4, 1873 – March 3, 1875 | Succeeded by Elias W. Leavenworth |
| Preceded by William H. Lamport | Member of the U.S. House of Representatives from New York's 26th congressional district March 4, 1875 – March 3, 1877 | Succeeded by John H. Camp |
