= Jacob P. Chamberlain =

American politician

Jacob Payson Chamberlain
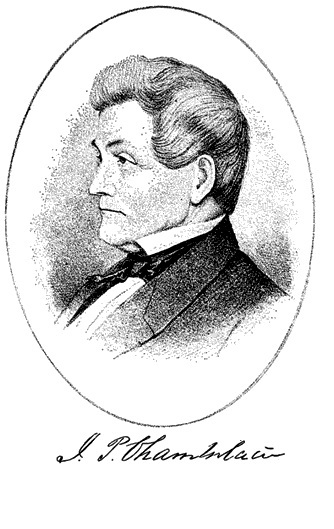

Member of the U.S. House of Representatives from New York's 26th district
- In office March 4, 1861 – March 3, 1863
- Preceded by: Emory B. Pottle
- Succeeded by: Giles W. Hotchkiss

Personal details
- Born: August 1, 1802 Dudley, Massachusetts, U.S.
- Died: October 5, 1878 (aged 76) Seneca Falls, New York, U.S.
- Resting place: Restvale Cemetery
- Party: Republican
- Other political affiliations: Bucktail Democrat; Whig

Jacob Payson Chamberlain (August 1, 1802 – October 5, 1878) was a U.S. representative from New York during the American Civil War.

== Life and career ==
Jacob P. Chamberlain was born in Dudley, Massachusetts on August 1, 1802. His family moved to western New York in 1807. He was educated there and became a school teacher and farmer and served as Varick's Town Clerk before settling in Seneca Falls, New York, where he began a business career.

Chamberlain owned and operated farms, flour mills, malthouses, distilleries and woolen mills, and was one of the original organizers of the first bank in Seneca Falls.

Originally a Bucktail Democrat, he later became a Whig, and joined the Republican Party when it was founded in the mid-1850s. He served in several local offices, including school board member and village president.

Chamberlain was an active supporter of the Methodist Episcopal Church.

In 1848 he attended the Seneca Falls Convention and was one of the signers of the Declaration of Sentiments which called for equal rights for women.

He was a member of the New York State Assembly in 1859.

Chamberlain was elected as a Republican to the Thirty-seventh Congress (March 4, 1861 – March 3, 1863). He was not a candidate for renomination and returned to his business and farming interests.

== Death and burial ==
He died in Seneca Falls, New York, October 5, 1878 and was interred in Restvale Cemetery.

== Family ==
Chamberlain had an uncle named Jacob Chamberlain, and a cousin, Jacob M. Chamberlain. They lived in the same area, and they are sometimes confused with each other in records and documents.

== External resources ==
- United States Congress. "Jacob P. Chamberlain (id: C000278)". Biographical Directory of the United States Congress. Retrieved on 2009-5-12
- Jacob P. Chamberlain at Find a Grave

New York State Assembly
Preceded by Augustus Woodworth	New York State Assembly; Seneca County; 1859	Succeeded by John C. Hall
U.S. House of Representatives
Preceded by Emory B. Pottle	Member of the U.S. House of Representatives from New York's 26th congressional district 1861–1863	Succeeded by Giles W. Hotchkiss
