= Hopkins Beach, New York =

Hamlet in New York, United States

Coordinates: 43°18′05″N 78°53′17″W

Hopkins Beach is a hamlet in the town of Wilson in Niagara County, New York, United States.
