= South Wilson, New York =

Hamlet in New York, United States

Coordinates: 43°14′30″N 78°48′47″W

South Wilson is a hamlet in the town of Wilson in Niagara County, New York, United States.
