= Frank A. Cipolla =

- Born: Wilson, New York, U.S.
- Military career
- Allegiance: United States
- Branch: United States Army
- Service years: 1972–2012
- Rank: Brigadier general
- Unit: United States Army Reserve
- Awards: Distinguished Service Medal; Legion of Merit (2); Bronze Star Medal

Frank A. Cipolla is an American retired military officer who served as a brigadier general in the United States Army.

== Early life and education ==
A native of Wilson, New York, Cipolla is a graduate of Pennsylvania State University.

== Career ==
Cipolla originally enlisted in the United States Army at Fort Polk in Vernon Parish, Louisiana, in 1972. He was commissioned an officer in 1977. Soon, he went on to serve various assignments and commands with the 98th Division. Additionally, he has held assignments at Fort Leonard Wood in Pulaski County, Missouri, and The Pentagon. In 2004, he was deployed to serve in the Iraq War.

Cipolla served as the Deputy Commanding General of the 88th Regional Support Command at Fort McCoy in Monroe County, Wisconsin, until 2012. Previously, he has held commands at Fort Totten in Queens County, New York, and Fort Snelling in Hennepin County, Minnesota.

He retired on 30 June 2012.

== Honors and awards ==
He has been awarded the Distinguished Service Medal, the Legion of Merit with oak leaf cluster, the Bronze Star Medal, the Meritorious Service Medal with four oak leaf clusters, the Army Commendation Medal with four oak leaf clusters, the Army Achievement Medal with oak leaf cluster, the Army Reserve Components Achievement Medal with silver oak leaf cluster, the National Defense Service Medal, the Iraq Campaign Medal, the Global War on Terrorism Service Medal, the Armed Forces Reserve Medal with silver hourglass device, and the Army Service Ribbon. In addition, he is authorized to wear the Office of the Joint Chiefs of Staff Identification Badge and the Combat Action Badge.
