= John H. Camp =

American politician

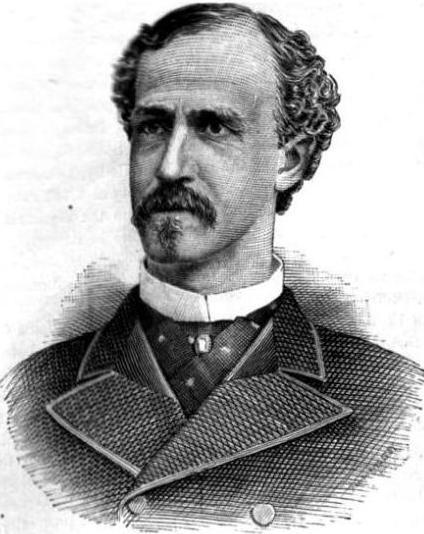

Member of the U.S. House of Representatives from New York's 26th district
- In office March 4, 1877 – March 3, 1883
- Preceded by: Clinton D. MacDougall
- Succeeded by: Sereno E. Payne

Personal details
- Born: April 4, 1840 Ithaca, New York
- Died: October 12, 1892 (aged 52) Lyons, New York
- Party: Republican
- Education: Albany Law School
- Occupation: lawyer

John Henry Camp (April 4, 1840 – October 12, 1892) was a U.S. representative from New York.

Born in Ithaca, New York, Camp attended the common schools, and was graduated from the Albany Law School in 1860. He was admitted to the bar the same year and commenced practice in Lyons, New York. He served as clerk of the surrogate court in 1863. He served as prosecuting attorney of Wayne County in 1867–1870.

Camp was elected as a Republican to the Forty-fifth, Forty-sixth, and Forty-seventh Congresses (March 4, 1877 – March 3, 1883). He was not a candidate for reelection in 1882. He resumed the practice of law in Lyons, New York, where he died October 12, 1892. He was interred in Grove Cemetery, Trumansburg, New York.

U.S. House of Representatives
Preceded by Clinton D. MacDougall	Member of the U.S. House of Representatives from New York's 26th congressional district 1877–1883	Succeeded by Sereno E. Payne
