= Giles W. Hotchkiss =

American politician

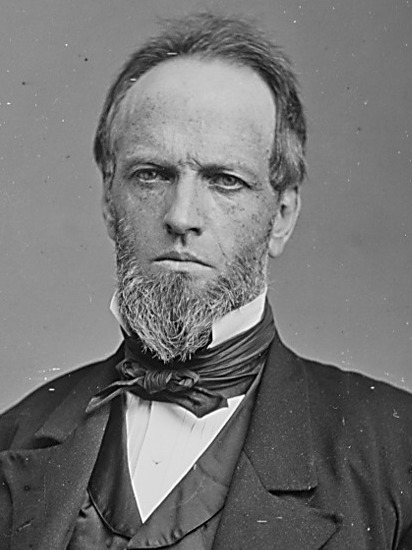

Member of the U.S. House of Representatives from New York's 26th district
- In office March 4, 1869 – March 3, 1871
- Preceded by: William S. Lincoln
- Succeeded by: Milo Goodrich
- In office March 4, 1863 – March 3, 1867
- Preceded by: Jacob P. Chamberlain
- Succeeded by: William S. Lincoln

Personal details
- Born: October 25, 1815 Windsor, New York, U.S.
- Died: July 5, 1878 (aged 62) Binghamton, New York, U.S.
- Resting place: Spring Forest Cemetery, Binghamton, New York, U.S.
- Party: Republican
- Spouse: Bessie R. Knapp (m. 1842)
- Children: 4

Giles Waldo Hotchkiss (October 25, 1815 – July 5, 1878) was an American attorney and politician from Binghamton, New York. Active in politics as a Republican, he served in the United States House of Representatives from 1863 to 1867, and again from 1869 to 1871.

== Biography ==
Hotchkiss was born in Windsor, New York, on October 25, 1815, the youngest son of Cyrus Hotchkiss and Sarah "Sally" (Andrews) Hotchkiss. He attended the common schools of Windsor, Windsor Academy, and Oxford Academy. Hotchkiss studied law with attorney Franklin G. Wheeler, attained admission to the bar in 1837, and began to practice in Binghamton, New York.

Active in politics as a Republican, Hotchkiss was one of the party's founders. He was a delegate to the 1860 Republican National Convention.

In 1862, Hotchkiss was elected as to the United States House of Representatives, and he was reelected in 1864. He served in the 38th and 39th Congresses, March 4, 1863 to March 3, 1867. He was an unsuccessful candidate for re-nomination in 1866.

Hotchkiss was elected to the U.S. House again in 1868 and served in the 41st Congress, March 4, 1869 to March 3, 1871. He was not a candidate for re-nomination in 1870.

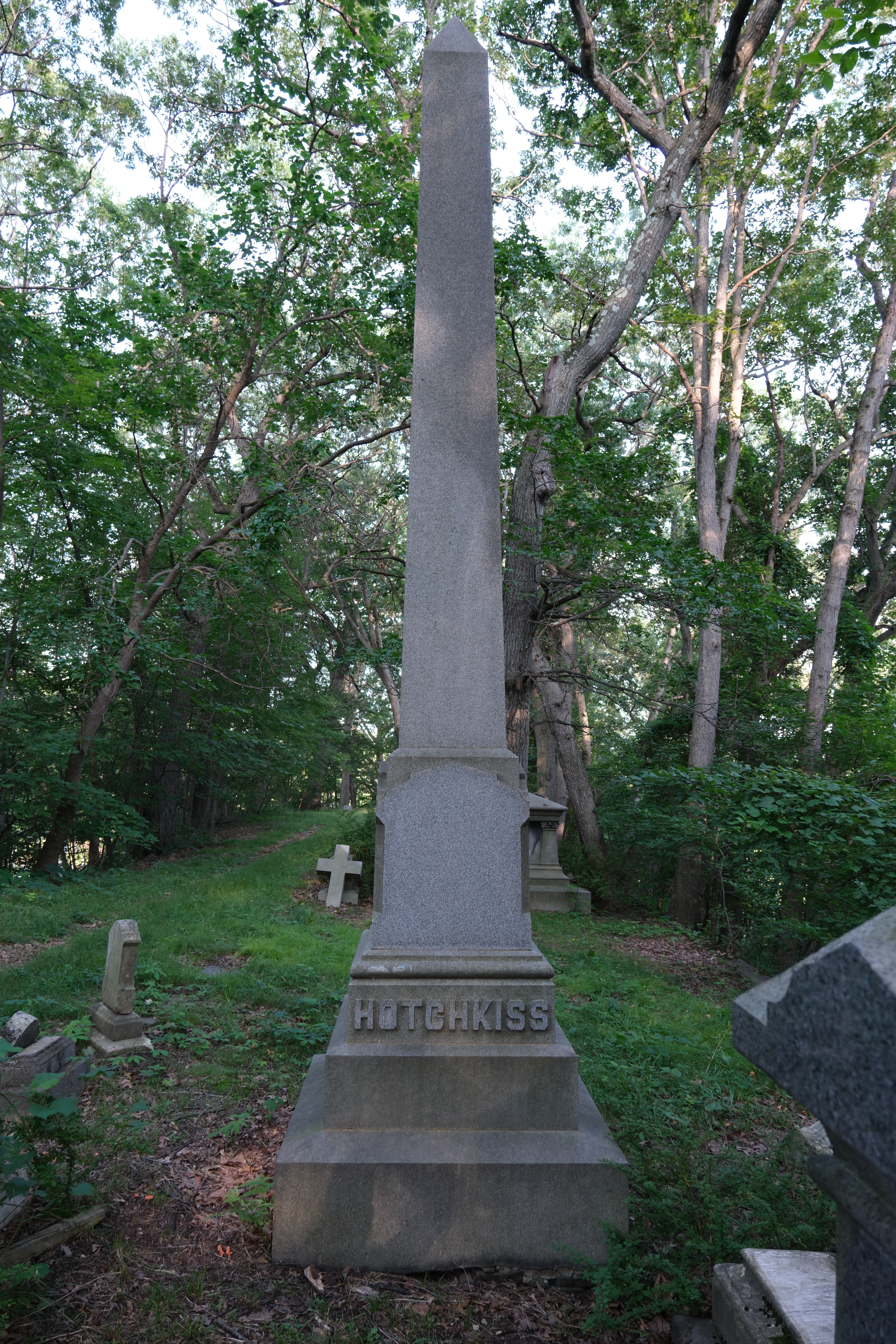
Grave of Hotchkiss in Spring Forest Cemetery

After leaving Congress, Hotchkiss resumed the practice of law in Binghamton. He died in Binghamton on July 5, 1878. Hotchkiss was interred At Binghamton's Spring Forest Cemetery.

U.S. House of Representatives
Preceded by Jacob P. Chamberlain	Member of the U.S. House of Representatives from New York's 26th congressional district 1863–1867	Succeeded by William S. Lincoln
Preceded by William S. Lincoln	Member of the U.S. House of Representatives from New York's 26th congressional district 1869–1871	Succeeded by Milo Goodrich
