= Wilson High School (New York) =

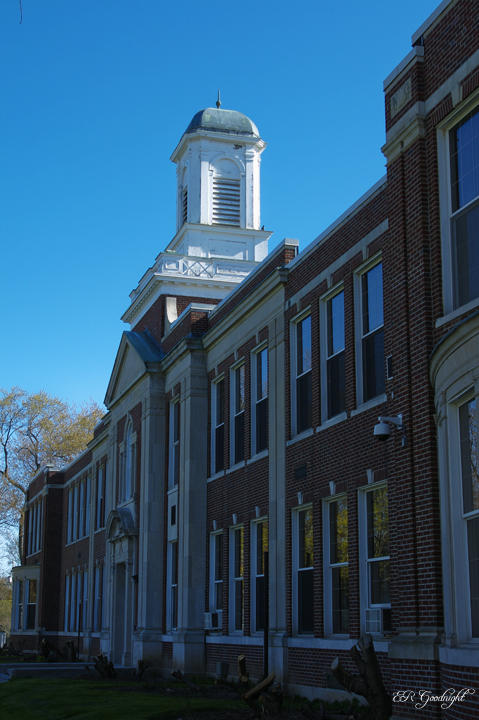

Location
- 374 Lake St; Wilson, New York 14172; United States
- Coordinates: 43°18′26.8″N 78°49′30.5″W

Information
- Type: Public
- Motto: Another Day, Another Scholar
- Established: 1935
- School district: Wilson Central School District
- NCES School ID: 363156004223
- Principal: Paul Galgovich
- Teaching staff: 60.26 (on an FTE basis)
- Grades: 6-12
- Enrollment: 494 (2023-2024)
- Student to teacher ratio: 8.20
- Campus: Rural: Distant
- Colors: Black and Orange
- Mascot: Pirate
- Team name: Lakemen/Lakewomen
- Yearbook: Crest
- Website: www.wilsoncsd.org/domain/13

Located in Wilson, New York, Wilson High School is part of the Wilson Central School District. It holds students in grades 9-12. Wilson High School accounts for 864 of Wilson Central School District's 1,515 students. It is connected to the Wilson Middle School, where grades 6-8 go.
