= Roosevelt Beach, New York =

Coordinates: 43°18′27″N 78°51′30″W

- Hamlet
- Interactive map of Roosevelt Beach, New York
- Town: Wilson
- County: Niagara County
- State: New York
- Country: United States

Roosevelt Beach is a hamlet in the town of Wilson in Niagara County, New York, United States.
