= East Wilson, New York =

Hamlet in New York, United States

Coordinates: 43°14′28″N 78°45′33″W

East Wilson is a hamlet in the town of Wilson in Niagara County, New York, United States. The hamlet was formerly called "Beebe's Corners"
