= Elberta, New York =

Hamlet in New York, United States

Coordinates: 43°15′50″N 78°52′13″W

Elberta, also known as Elberta Corners, is a hamlet in the town of Wilson in Niagara County, New York, United States. It is located at the intersection of Braley and Randall Roads.
