= Wilson-Tuscarora State Park =

State park in Niagara County, New York

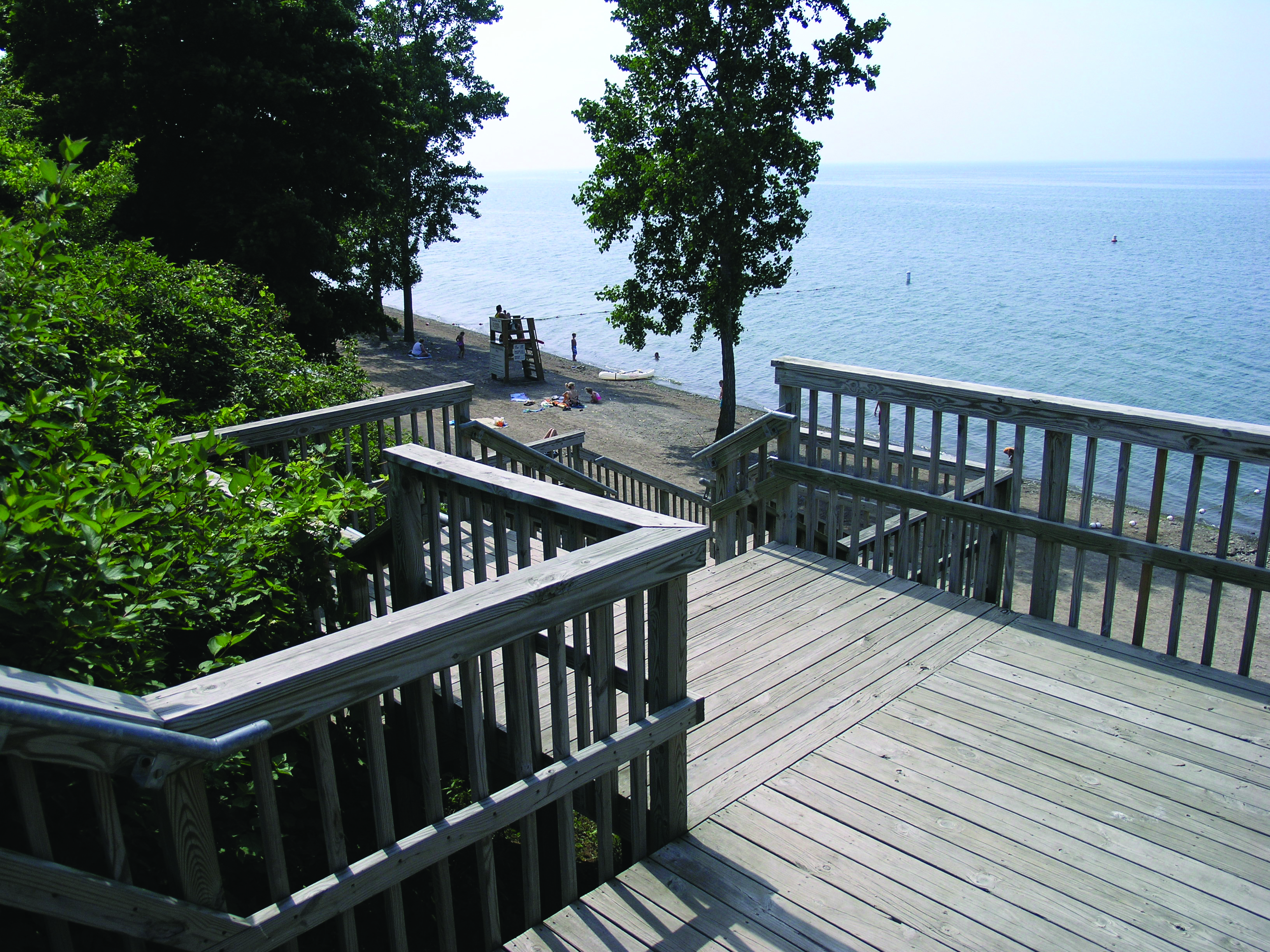
- Wilson-Tuscarora State Park, July 2006

- Location within New York
- Type: State park
- Location: Wilson, New York
- Coordinates: 43°18′00″N 78°51′40″W
- Area: 485 acres (1.96 km^{2})
- Created: 1965
- Operator: New York State Office of Parks, Recreation and Historic Preservation
- Visitors: 201,059 (in 2016)
- Open: All year

Wilson-Tuscarora State Park is a 485-acre (1.96 km^{2}) state park in Niagara County, New York. The park is located on the west side of the Village of Wilson along the south shore of Lake Ontario. Lake Road (New York State Route 18) passes through the park.

== History ==
The park was formed in 1965 on what was previously a sheep farm.

== Facilities ==
The park is open year-round for day use and offers a beach, picnic tables and pavilions, a playground, fishing (pan fish and game fish), hiking, a nature trail, seasonal wildfowl and small game hunting, snowshoeing and cross-county skiing, and a food concession. A marina launch from the park is located south of Sunset Island. There is also an 18-hole disc golf course at the park.

== See also ==
- List of New York state parks
