= William H. Lamport =

American politician

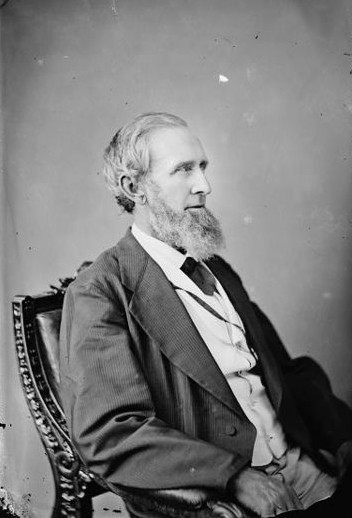

Member of the U.S. House of Representatives from New York
- In office March 4, 1871 – March 3, 1875
- Preceded by: William H. Kelsey
- Succeeded by: Clinton D. MacDougall
- Constituency: 25th district (1871–73); 26th district (1873–75)

Personal details
- Born: May 27, 1811 Brunswick, New York, U.S.
- Died: July 21, 1891 (aged 80) Canandaigua, New York, U.S.

William Henry Lamport (May 27, 1811 – July 21, 1891) was a U.S. representative from New York.

Born in Brunswick, New York, Lamport moved with his parents to Gorham, New York, in 1826. He attended the public schools. He engaged in agricultural pursuits. He was Supervisor of Gorham in 1848 and 1849 and Sheriff of Ontario County, 1850–1853. He was a member of the New York State Assembly (Ontario Co., 1st D.) in 1855.

He moved to Canandaigua, New York in 1864 and was president of the village of Canandaigua in 1866 and 1867.

Lamport was elected as a Republican to the 42nd and 43rd Congresses (March 4, 1871 – March 3, 1875). He was not a candidate for renomination in 1874.

He retired to Canandaigua where he died on July 21, 1891, and was interred in the West Avenue Cemetery.

New York State Assembly
Preceded by Jesse Cost	New York State Assembly; Ontario County, 1st District; 1855	Succeeded by Samuel A. Foot
U.S. House of Representatives
Preceded by William H. Kelsey	Member of the U.S. House of Representatives from New York's 25th congressional district March 4, 1871 – March 3, 1873	Succeeded by Clinton D. MacDougall
Preceded by Milo Goodrich	Member of the U.S. House of Representatives from New York's 26th congressional district March 4, 1873 – March 3, 1875	Succeeded by Clinton D. MacDougall
