= East Homer, New York =

- Hamlet
- Location within New York Location within the United States
- Coordinates: 42°39′58″N 76°06′06″W
- Country: United States
- State: New York
- County: Cortland
- Elevation: 1,138 ft (347 m)
- Time zone: UTC-5 (Eastern (EST))
  - Summer (DST): UTC-4 (EDT)
- ZIP Code: 13056 (PO box)
- Area code: 607
- GNIS feature ID: 949129

East Homer is a hamlet in Cortland County, New York, United States. The community is located along New York State Route 13, 6 miles (9.7 km) northeast of Cortland. East Homer had a post office until June 17, 1995; it still has its own ZIP code, 13056.
