= Wilson, New York =

- Town
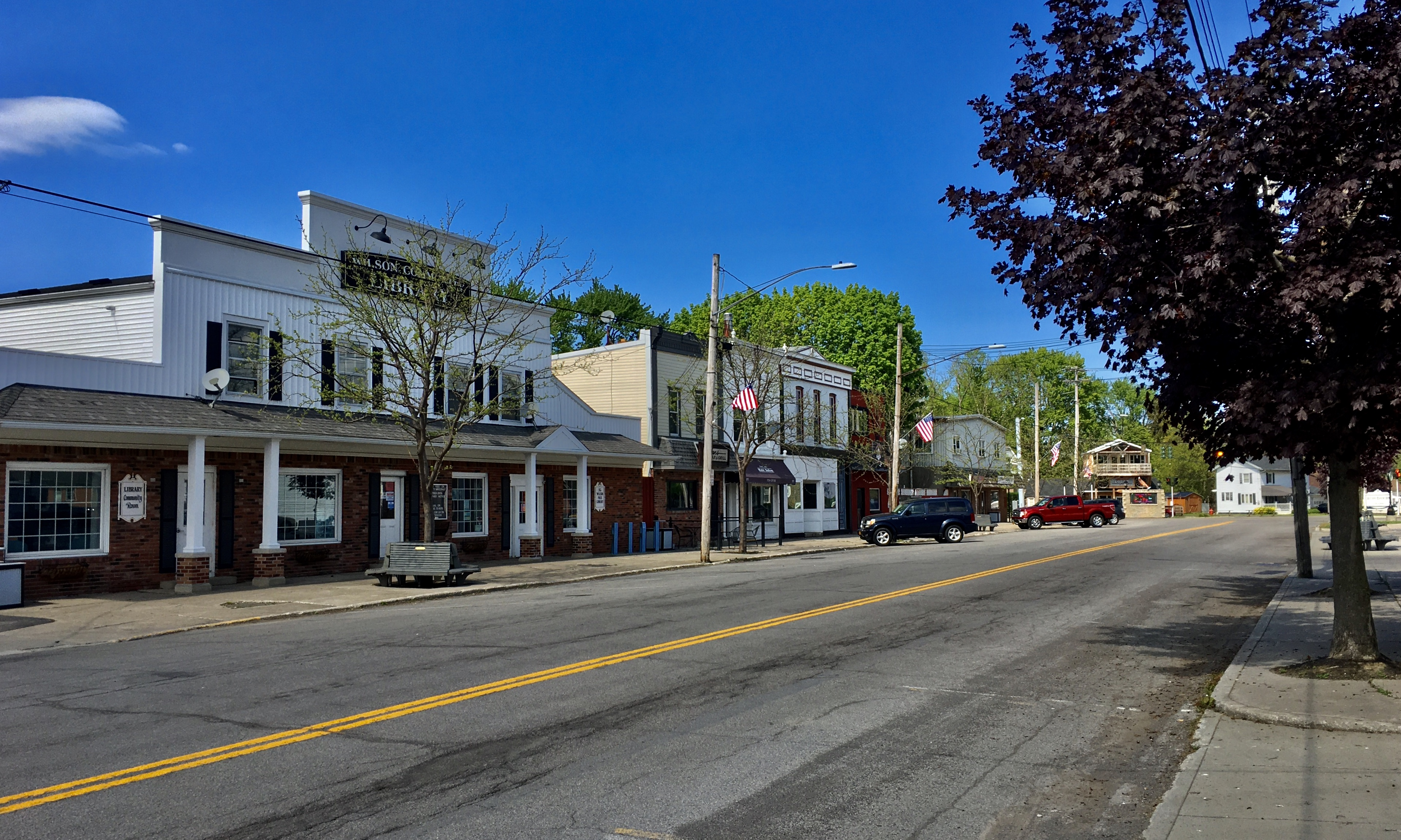
- Young Street

- Location in Niagara County and the state of New York.
- Coordinates: 43°16′N 78°50′W
- Country: United States
- State: New York
- County: Niagara
- Named for: Reuben Wilson

Government
  - Type: Town Council
  - Town Supervisor: Doyle Phillips (R)
  - Town Council: Members' List: • Anthony Evans(R); • James V. Muscoreil (R); • Robert Hull (R); • Anne Basile (R)

Area
  - Total: 51.46 sq mi (133.29 km^{2})
  - Land: 49.41 sq mi (127.96 km^{2})
  - Water: 2.06 sq mi (5.33 km^{2})

Population (2010)
  - Total: 5,993
  - Estimate (2016): 5,841
  - Density: 118.2/sq mi (45.65/km^{2})
- Time zone: Eastern (EST)
- ZIP Codes: 14172 (Wilson); 14131 (Ransomville); 14108 (Newfane); 14028 (Burt)
- FIPS code: 36-063-82370
- Website: www.wilsonnewyork.com

Wilson is a town in Niagara County, New York, United States. The population was 5,993 at the 2010 census. The town was named after an early settler, Reuben Wilson, who built and dwelt in a log cabin on the shore of Lake Ontario at the site of what would become the Village of Wilson.

The Town of Wilson is on the northern border of the county and contains a village, also called Wilson.

== History ==
The Town of Wilson was established in 1818 from the town of Porter. The origin of the town name is Reuben Wilson, one of the earliest pioneers of the town.

The Morse Cobblestone Farmhouse was listed on the National Register of Historic Places in 2010.

== Geography ==
According to the United States Census Bureau, the town has a total area of 51.5 square miles (133.3 km^{2}), of which 49.5 square miles (128.3 km^{2}) is land and 1.9 square miles (5.0 km^{2}) (3.75%) is water.

The Town of Wilson is on the south shore of Lake Ontario.

North–south highway New York State Route 425 (Wilson-Cambria Road) intersects New York State Route 18 (Seaway Trail) in Wilson village.

=== Adjacent cities and towns ===
- Town of Porter - west
- Town of Lewiston - southwest
- Town of Newfane - east
- Town of Cambria - south
- Lake Ontario - north

=== Major highways in the Town of Wilson ===
- New York State Route 18 (Lake Rd., Creek Rd.), East-West Highway across the north part of town roughly paralleling Lake Ontario from Porter town line to the Newfane town line.
- New York State Route 93 (Youngstown-Lockport Rd.), east–west roadway through the southwest part of town from the Cambria town line to the Porter town line.
- New York State Route 425 (Cambria-Wilson Rd.), (Lake Street), north–south roadway through the town from its northern terminus with NY 18 to the Cambria town line.

== Demographics ==
Historical population
Census	Pop.	Note	%±
1820	688		—
1830	913		32.7%
1840	1,753		92.0%
1850	2,955		68.6%
1860	3,372		14.1%
1870	2,912		−13.6%
1880	3,234		11.1%
1890	2,978		−7.9%
1900	2,881		−3.3%
1910	2,970		3.1%
1920	2,753		−7.3%
1930	2,801		1.7%
1940	3,061		9.3%
1950	3,696		20.7%
1960	5,319		43.9%
1970	5,316		−0.1%
1980	5,792		9.0%
1990	5,761		−0.5%
2000	5,840		1.4%
2010	5,993		2.6%
2016 (est.)	5,841	▼	−2.5%
U.S. Decennial Census

As of the census of 2000, there were 5,840 people, 2,224 households, and 1,672 families residing in the town. The population density was 117.9 inhabitants per square mile (45.5/km^{2}). There were 2,438 housing units at an average density of 49.2 per square mile (19.0/km^{2}). The racial makeup of the town was 97.57% White, 0.38% Black or African American, 0.53% Native American, 0.26% Asian, 0.03% Pacific Islander, 0.36% from other races, and 0.87% from two or more races. Hispanic or Latino of any race were 0.84% of the population.

There were 2,224 households, out of which 33.9% had children under the age of 18 living with them, 62.4% were married couples living together, 7.8% had a female householder with no husband present, and 24.8% were non-families. 21.1% of all households were made up of individuals, and 9.9% had someone living alone who was 65 years of age or older. The average household size was 2.63 and the average family size was 3.04.

In the town, the population was spread out, with 25.7% under the age of 18, 6.3% from 18 to 24, 28.1% from 25 to 44, 26.4% from 45 to 64, and 13.5% who were 65 years of age or older. The median age was 39 years. For every 100 females, there were 97.4 males. For every 100 females age 18 and over, there were 96.4 males.

The median income for a household in the town was $44,557, and the median income for a family was $47,180. Males had a median income of $40,750 versus $23,494 for females. The per capita income for the town was $19,654. About 3.4% of families and 5.2% of the population were below the poverty line, including 5.3% of those under age 18 and 3.4% of those age 65 or over.

== Nearby locations ==
- Coolidge Beach – A shoreline hamlet west of Roosevelt Beach
- Dorwood Park – A location west of South Wilson.
- East Wilson – A hamlet near the eastern town line on Chestnut Road.
- Elberta – A hamlet in the western part of the town south of Wilson village.
- Hollands International Airport (85N) – A small grass strip general aviation airport, located near the eastern town line. It is used for parachute jumping.
- Hopkins Beach – A shoreline hamlet near the western county line.
- Pleasant Corners – A hamlet on NY-425 at Braley Road.
- Roosevelt Beach – A shoreline hamlet west of Wilson village.
- South Wilson – A hamlet south of Wilson village on the Cambria-Wilson Road (NY-425).
- Sunset Beach – A shoreline hamlet on the west side of Wilson village.
- Twelve Mile Creek – A stream that flows into Lake Ontario at the Wilson-Tuscarora State Park, west of Wilson village.
- Wilson – The Village of Wilson is on the Lake Ontario shore at the junction of routes NY-18 and NY-425.
- Wilson-Tuscarora State Park – A lakeside park west of Wilson village.
- Woodland Heights – A lakeside hamlet near the northeast part of the town.
