= Entranceway at Main Street at Roycroft Boulevard =

- U.S. National Register of Historic Places
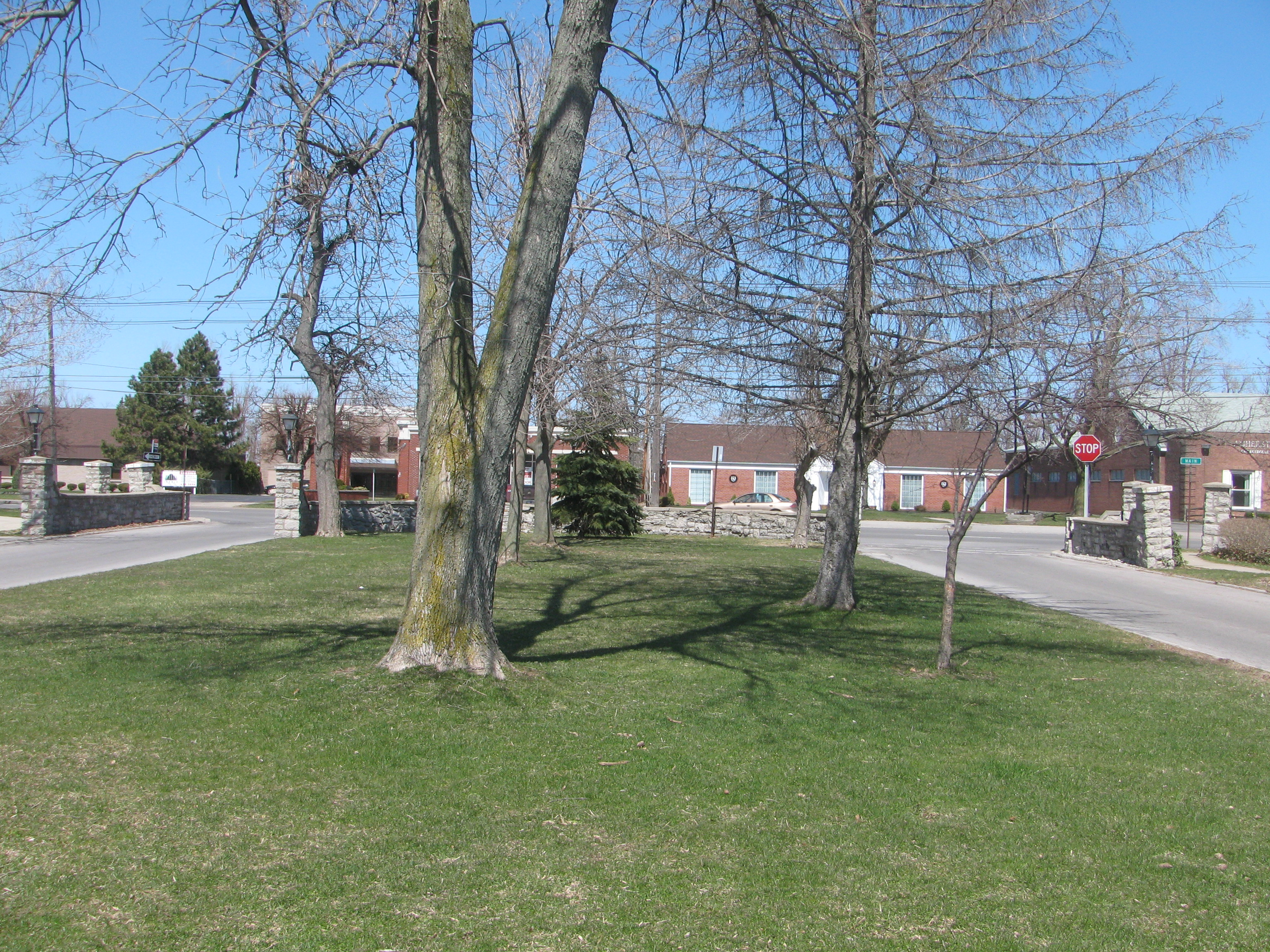
- Entranceway at Main Street at Roycroft Boulevard from south, April 12, 2009

- Location within New York Location within the United States
- Location: Main St., jct. with Roycroft Blvd., Amherst, New York
- Coordinates: 42°57′43.95″N 78°46′47.95″W
- Built: 1918
- Architect: Abbot and Beymer
- Architectural style: Tudor Revival
- MPS: Suburban Development of Buffalo, New York MPS
- NRHP reference No.: 05001378
- Added to NRHP: December 7, 2005

Entranceway at Main Street at Roycroft Boulevard is a suburban residential subdivision entranceway built in 1918. It is on Main Street (New York State Route 5) in the hamlet of Snyder, New York, in the town of Amherst within Erie County. The entranceway is a marker that represents the American suburbanization of rural areas, suburbanization that occurred through transportation-related land development on the edges of urban areas. It consists of a variety of half-height wall formations, featuring a semicircular wall on the Roycroft Boulevard median's intersection with Main Street. The entranceway was added to the National Register of Historic Places on December 7, 2005.

== History ==
Williamsville developed around a mill erected in 1811, and the town of Amherst was born in 1818. At that time, Main Street was the main link from Williamsville and Amherst to Buffalo. Main Street was displaced as "the unchallenged main artery of Amherst and Western New York" by the Erie Canal in 1825 and later by adjacent railroads. By 1866, Buffalo Street Railway Company built a street car system that ran on Main Street from Amherst to Buffalo. Daily stage coach service also began in 1866 along Main Street and continued until it was displaced by an electric trolley in 1893, the track ran 4.5 miles (7.2 km) from Main and Bailey Avenue (U.S. Route 62 in New York) to the east with stops that included Entranceways at Main Street at Lamarck Drive and Smallwood Drive.

The early 20th century estate era gave way to the residential subdivision era. Suburban Buffalo's subdivisions took on an urban flavor along the area's main thoroughfares and paths of migration. Charles S. Burkhardt began Audubon Terrace on 400 acres north of Main Street in October 1919 on the Taylor and Satterfield Estates.

== Location ==
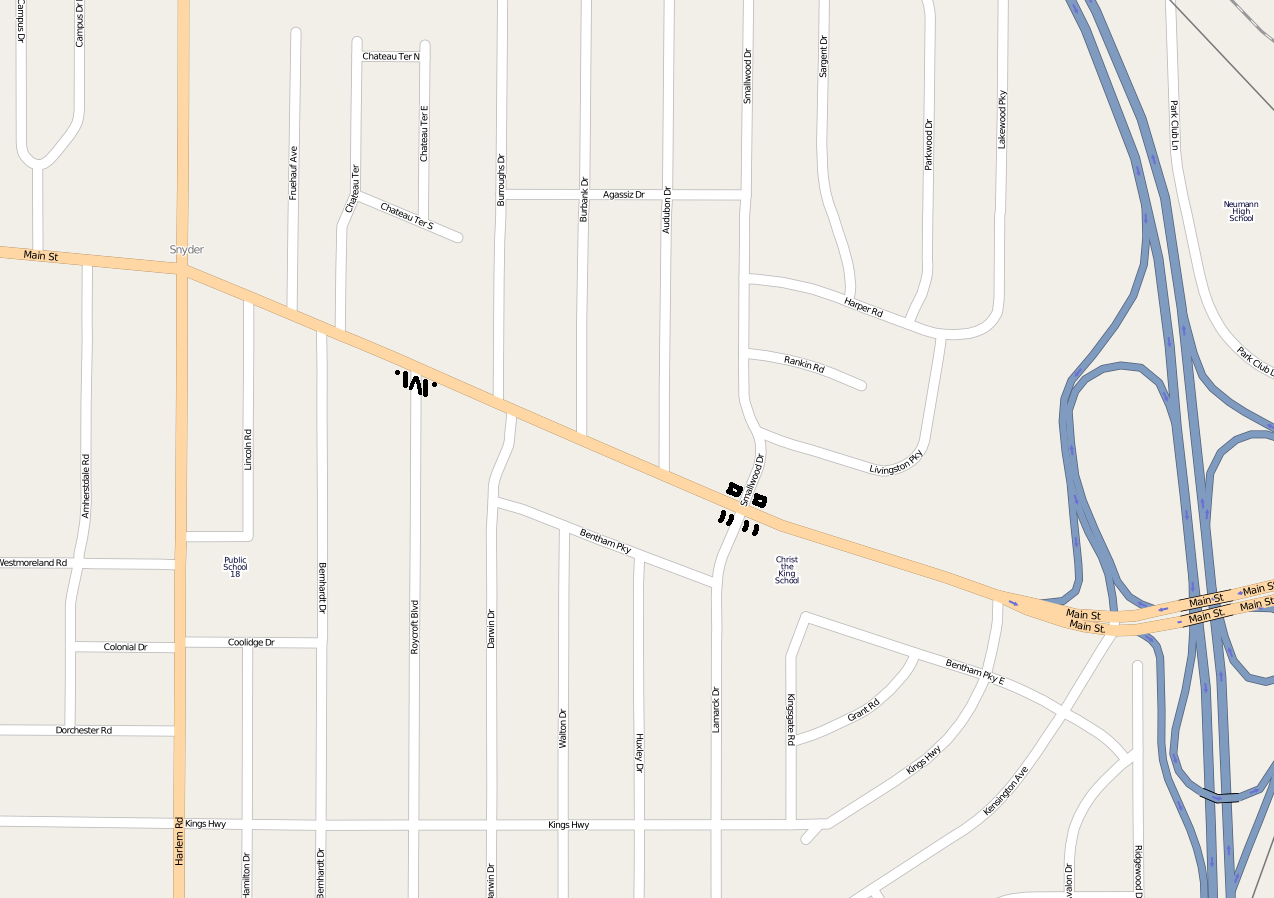
Snyder, NY's original National Register of Historic Places Entranceways at Lamarck Drive and Smallwood Drive and Roycroft Boulevard were added in to the register in 2005. Later other entranceways were added to the register.

Today, Main Street is a four-lane road running east–west through Snyder connecting Williamsville (the other side of Interstate 290, known as the Youngman Expressway) to points westward such as the neighboring hamlet of Eggertsville and downtown Buffalo. The entranceway is located proximate to large residential areas of trees and grass, 1920s-built subdivisions flanking a wide central median. It is situated three blocks east of Harlem Road (New York State Route 240). Across Main Street and northeast from the Entranceway is the Eggertsville-Snyder Branch Library of the Buffalo & Erie County Public Library located at 4622 Main Street. Each side of the median serves one-way traffic. The entranceways sit on the two south side corners of this T-junction intersection.

== Architecture ==
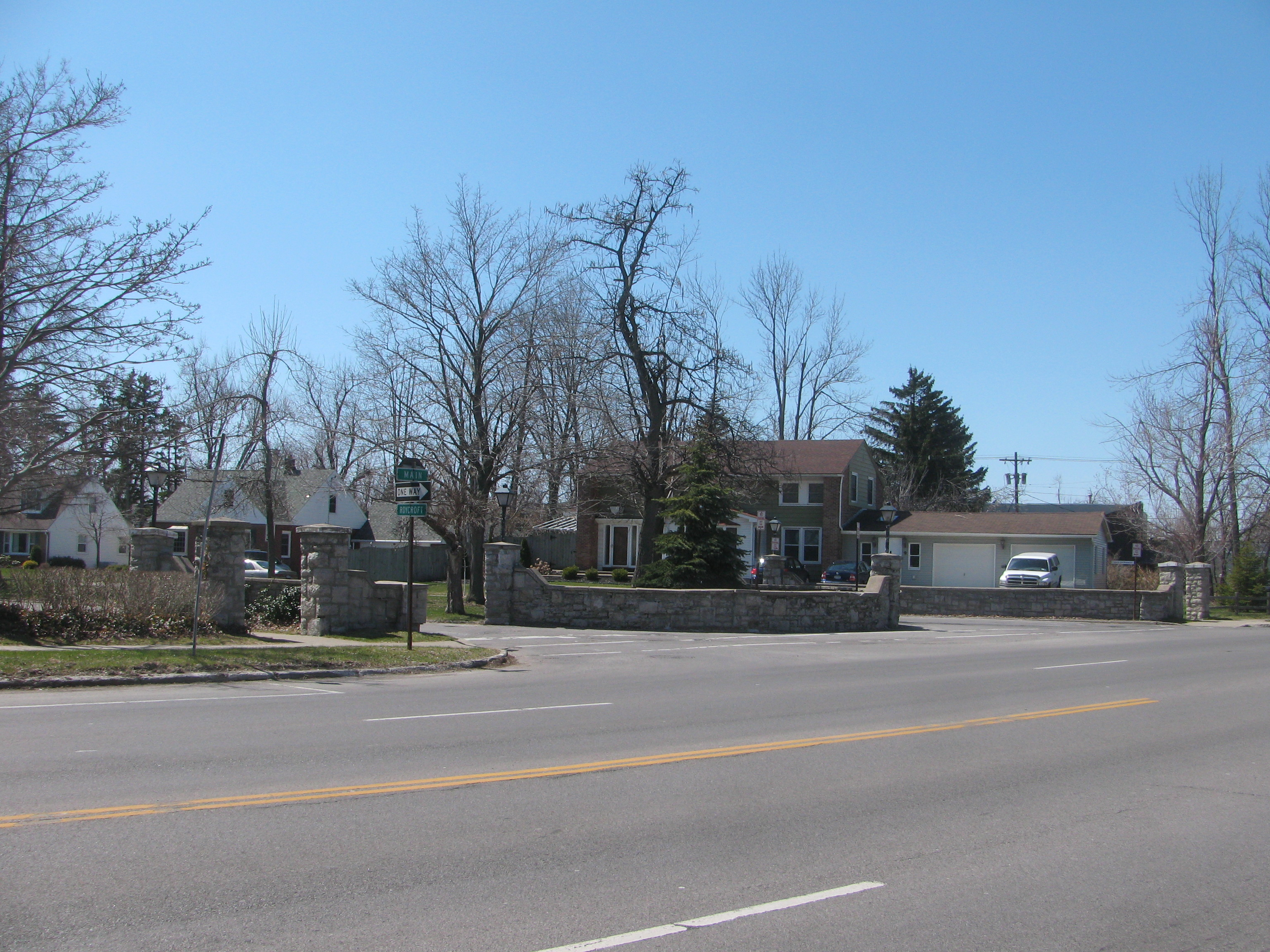
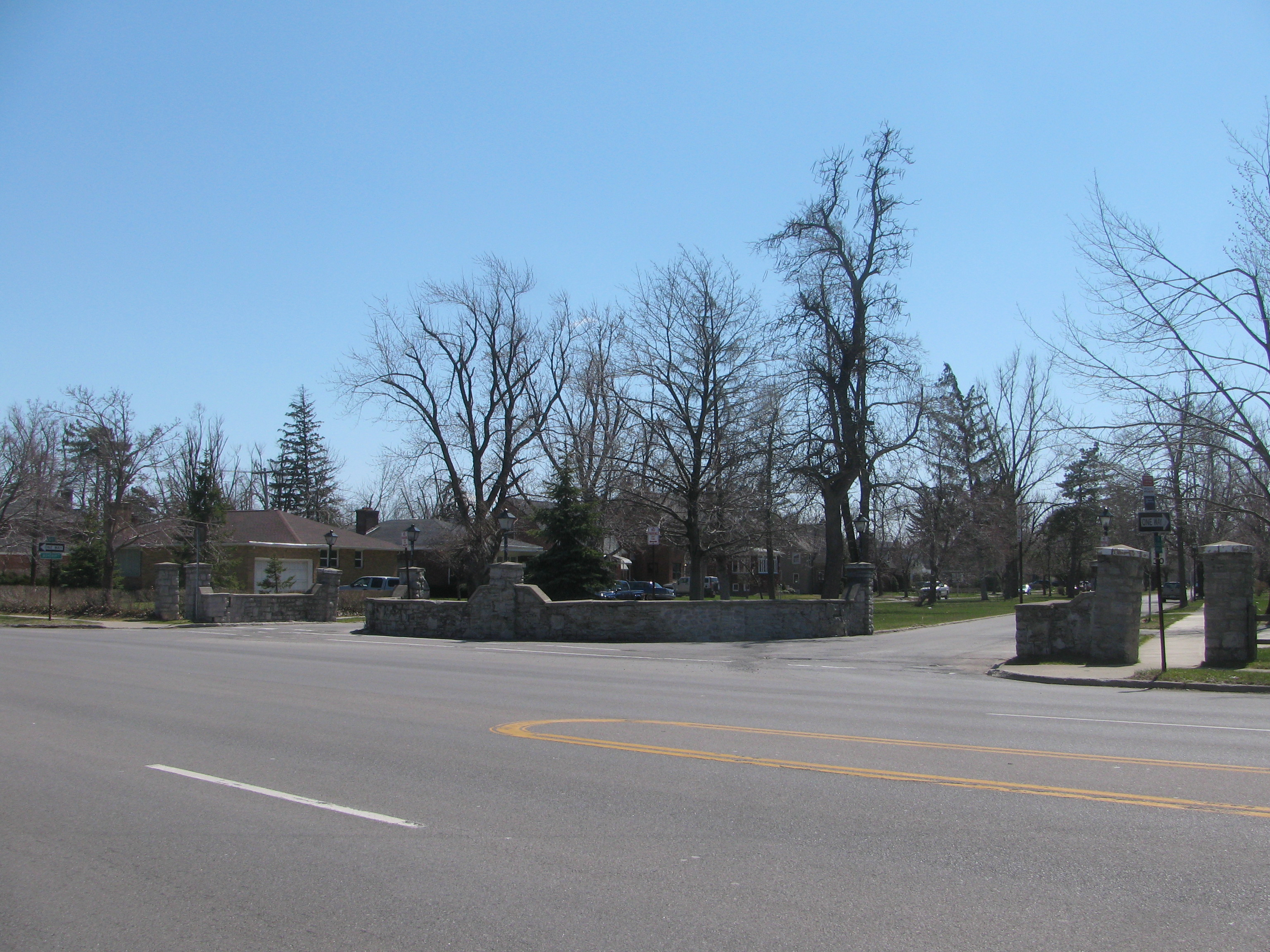
Entranceway from Eggertsville-Snyder Branch Library to the northeast (top) and northwest (bottom)

Completed in 1918, the entranceway's featured element is the nearly semi-circular random ashlar stone half-walls on Roycroft Boulevard's axis of symmetry, which is at a 22-degree angle to Main Street. The wall has one central and two end square posts that are approximately 4 feet (1.2 m) in height and that have poured concrete caps that are not original. Each post has a metal and glass contemporary street lamp projecting from its center. Quarter points of the arc have stone pilaster ornamentation. The running portion of the wall has a continuous cast in place coping cap shaped at a 45-degree angle, which forms an attached buttress three quarters the height of the posts. Past repairs have included incompatible stone and mortar patches. The Main Street paving and the grassy median abut the convex and concave sides, respectively. According to the August 5, 2005, application, the entranceway is in a state of disrepair, lacking a visible base and having a tilt.

On opposite sides of the Roycroft Boulevard roadways from the central feature are flanking structures with random ashlar stone posts and half-height walls. They are oriented parallel to the angular Roycroft Boulevard and have lengths proportionate to the central wall end post's distance from Main Street. Both walls are L-shaped with the longer length extending along Roycroft Boulevard and having a short cornered length along Main Street. These walls have capped, square stone buttress-less posts and corners marked by wall-height stone pilaster. On the opposite side of each from the a concrete sidewalk parallel to Roycroft Boulevard is a free-standing stone post. The west side is in fair condition, while the east side is out of vertical alignment and is in poor condition. The east side has the distinction of retaining the only original cast concrete cap with a circular recess on its north end post. It presumably once held an original lamp post and was once painted white. Its south end post has a four-piece, white terra cotta cap resembling the other non-original end posts in the set of structures.

== Legacy ==
The entryways remain in their original location, retain original design, and setting. They continue to mark the entrance to the subdivision's entrance for vehicular and pedestrian traffic as they were originally designed to do. Abbott and Beymer Land Co. purchased the land for the Aurora Park subdivision that the entranceway has marked since its 1918 construction. The street and plot plan were designed by the Straley Brothers, who were civil engineers and surveyors from Buffalo. County engineer, George C. Diehl, had a role in the development of this subdivision. The entranceway was added to the National Register of Historic Places on December 7, 2005.

== See also ==
- National Register of Historic Places listings in Erie County, New York
