= Jordan Nwora =

American basketball player (born 1998)

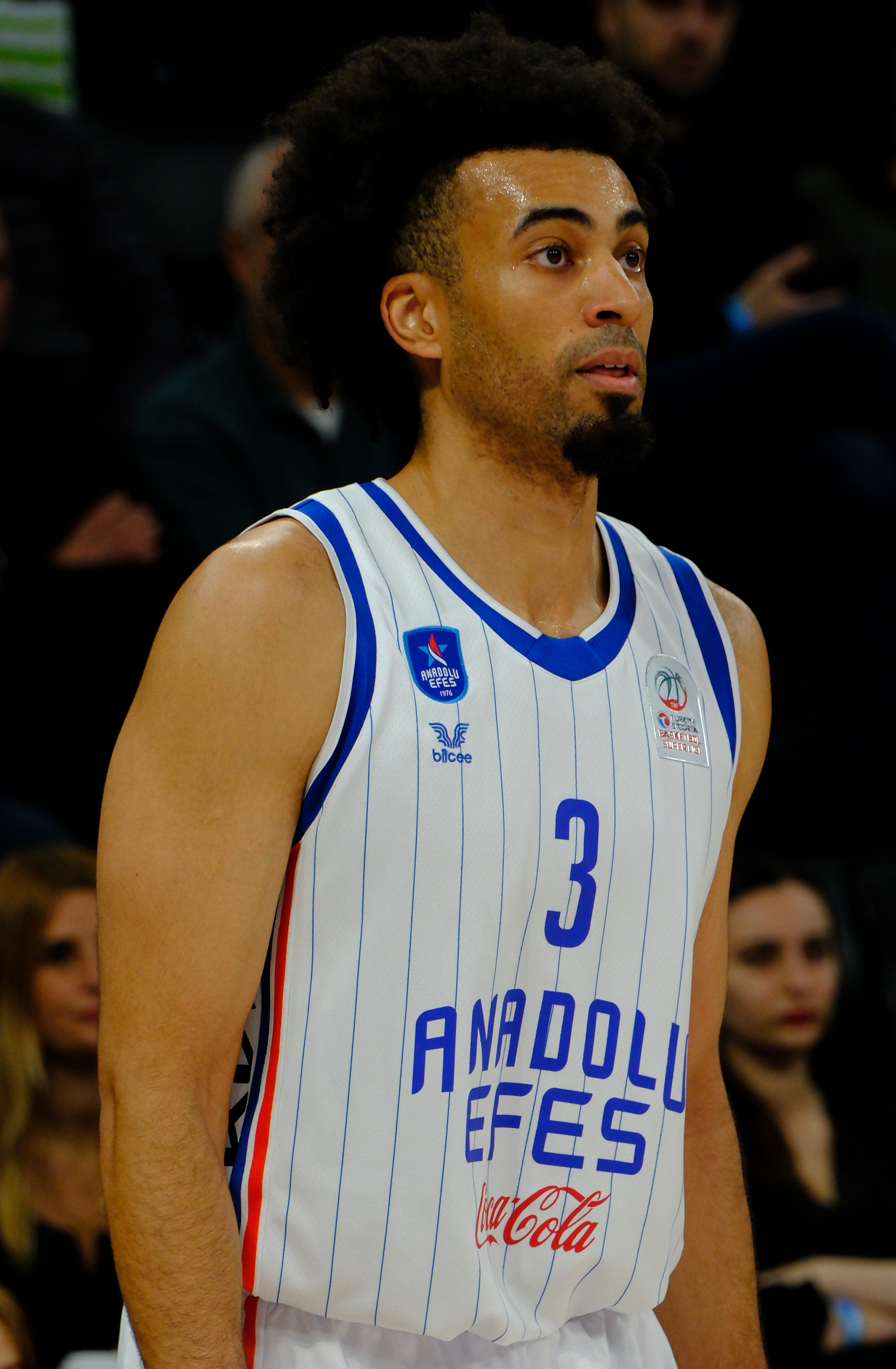
- Nwora with Anadolu Efes in 2024

No. 33 – Crvena zvezda
- Position: Small forward
- League: KLS; ABA League; EuroLeague

Personal information
- Born: September 9, 1998 (age 28) Buffalo, New York, U.S.
- Listed height: 2.01 m (6 ft 7 in)
- Listed weight: 225 lb (102 kg)

Career information
- High school: Amherst Central (Amherst, New York); The Park School of Buffalo (Snyder, New York); Vermont Academy (Saxtons River, Vermont)
- College: Louisville (2017–2020)
- NBA draft: 2020: 2nd round, 45th overall pick
- Drafted by: Milwaukee Bucks
- Playing career: 2020–present

Career history
- 2020–2023: Milwaukee Bucks
- 2021: →Salt Lake City Stars
- 2021–2022: →Wisconsin Herd
- 2023–2024: Indiana Pacers
- 2024: Toronto Raptors
- 2024–2025: Anadolu Efes
- 2025–present: Crvena zvezda

Career highlights
- NBA champion (2021); Serbian Cup winner (2026); Serbian Cup MVP (2026); Turkish Super Cup winner (2024); Third-team All-American – AP, SN, USBWA, NABC (2020); First-team All-ACC (2020); Third-team All-ACC (2019); ACC Most Improved Player (2019)
- Stats at NBA.com
- Stats at Basketball Reference

Jordan Ifeanyi Nwora (/ˈwɔːrə/ WOR-ə; born September 9, 1998) is a Nigerian-American professional basketball player for Crvena zvezda of the Basketball League of Serbia (KLS), the ABA League and the EuroLeague. He played college basketball for the Louisville Cardinals. He plays internationally for the Nigeria men's national basketball team. Nwora won a championship with the Milwaukee Bucks in 2021 before being traded to the Indiana Pacers in 2023 and again to the Toronto Raptors in 2024.

== Early life ==
Nwora was born on September 9, 1998, in Buffalo, New York to a Nigerian father and an American mother. His father Alexander Nwora, a basketball coach, helped Jordan in developing his basketball abilities.

== High school career ==
Nwora started playing basketball at Amherst Central High School in the 2013–2014 season, before transferring to The Park School of Buffalo for two seasons. At The Park School he shot 42 percent from three-point range, leading the Pioneers to the New York State Federation Class B championship, averaging 21.5 points, 6.5 rebounds, 2.4 steals, and 1.4 assists. His second season at The Park School saw him raise all of his season averages, turning in 23.4 points, 10.1 rebounds, 2.3 steals, and 1.8 assists. He earned First Team All-Centercourt honors in both his junior and senior seasons playing at The Park School. Nwora continued his prep career for one more season, where he scored over 500 points at Vermont Academy, averaging 18.7 points and 5.3 rebounds in the 2016–2017 season.

== College career ==
Nwora joined the Louisville Cardinals in 2018. In his freshman season, he averaged 5.7 points, 2.2 rebounds and 0.4 assists per game.

During his sophomore season, Nwora became a permanent starter on the team six games into the season. He averaged 17.0 points, 7.6 rebounds, and 1.3 assists per game, becoming the second Most Improved Player in the NCAA and named Most Improved Player in the ACC.

He was named the preseason ACC player of the year. On January 29, 2020, Nwora scored a career-high 37 points and added nine rebounds in a 86–69 win against Boston College. At the conclusion of the regular season, Nwora was named to the First Team All-ACC, finishing second in the player of the year voting to Tre Jones. As a junior, Nwora averaged 18 points and 7.7 rebounds per game while shooting 44% from the field.

Following the season, Nwora declared for the 2020 NBA draft. He trained at Darren Fenn's XGen Elite basketball academy in West Seneca to keep in shape during the COVID-19 pandemic and prepare for the draft.

== Professional career ==
=== Milwaukee Bucks (2020–2023) ===
Nwora was selected with the 45th overall pick by the Milwaukee Bucks in the 2020 NBA draft. On November 24, 2020, the Bucks announced that they had signed Nwora. He was assigned to the Salt Lake City Stars for the start of the NBA G League season, making his debut on February 10, 2021. Three days later, he was recalled from the Stars because of an ankle injury. On May 16, Nwora ended his rookie season by scoring a career–high 34 points on 14–23 shooting, along with 14 rebounds and 2 blocks, during a 118–112 loss to the Chicago Bulls. During his rookie season, Nwora became an NBA champion, helping the Bucks defeat the Phoenix Suns in the 2021 NBA Finals.

On December 18, 2021, Nwora scored a season-high 28 points, along with 11 rebounds, in a 119–90 loss to the Cleveland Cavaliers. He made 62 appearances (13 starts) for Milwaukee during the 2021–22 NBA season, averaging 8.7 points, 3.7 rebounds, and 1.4 assists.

Nwora played in 38 games (including three starts) for the Bucks during the 2022–23 NBA season, logging averages of 6.0 points, 3.1 rebounds, and 1.0 assists.

=== Indiana Pacers (2023–2024) ===
On February 9, 2023, Nwora was traded to the Indiana Pacers along with George Hill and Serge Ibaka in a four-team trade involving the Brooklyn Nets and Phoenix Suns. Nwora joined Tyrese Haliburton, Aaron Nesmith, and Jalen Smith on the Pacers, and later Obi Toppin, all selected in the 2020 NBA draft. He made his Pacers debut on February 13, recording 7 points, 3 rebounds and 2 steals in a 123–117 loss to the Utah Jazz. On February 25, Nwora recorded 18 points, 8 rebounds, and 6 assists on 8–12 shooting, in a win over the Orlando Magic. On March 13 against the Detroit Pistons, Nwora recorded 20 points, four rebounds, and two steals. On March 25 against the Atlanta Hawks, Nwora posted a Pacers season–high 33 points and added six rebounds during a loss. He scored 25 of his 33 points in the 2nd quarter, setting the Pacers regular–season franchise record for most points in a quarter since tracking began in the 1996–97 NBA season.

=== Toronto Raptors (2024) ===
On January 17, 2024, the Pacers traded Nwora, along with Bruce Brown, Kira Lewis Jr., and three first-round draft picks to the Toronto Raptors in exchange for Pascal Siakam. Nwora made 34 appearances (one start) for Toronto, recording averages of 7.9 points, 3.4 rebounds, and 1.3 assists.

=== Anadolu Efes (2024–2025) ===
On August 5, 2024, Nwora signed with Anadolu Efes of the Turkish Basketbol Süper Ligi and the EuroLeague. On October 29, Nwora received Hoops Agents Player of the Week award for Round 4. He had a game-high 35 points, six rebounds and three assists for his team to win.

=== Crvena zvezda (2025–present) ===
On July 8, 2025, Nwora signed with Crvena zvezda of the ABA League.

== National team career ==
Nwora was called up to be part of the D'Tigers for the 2019 FIBA world cup qualifier between June 28–30, 2018, by his father Alexander Nwora who is the head coach of the team. In the tournament, he averaged 21.7 points, 8 rebounds and 2.7 assists. During the 2019 FIBA World Cup qualifiers in Lagos, Nwora scored 36 points against Mali to be the highest scoring player for Nigeria in history, breaking Ike Diogu's record of 31 points.

Nwora scored a game-high 33 points in a loss to Germany in the preliminary round of the 2020 Olympics in Tokyo. He led Nigeria in scoring in the tournament after averaging 21 points per game.

== Career statistics ==
Legend
GP	Games played	GS	Games started	MPG	Minutes per game
FG%	Field goal percentage	3P%	3-point field goal percentage	FT%	Free throw percentage
RPG	Rebounds per game	APG	Assists per game	SPG	Steals per game
BPG	Blocks per game	PPG	Points per game	**Bold**	Career high
†	Won an NBA championship

=== NBA ===
==== Regular season ====
Year	Team	GP	GS	MPG	FG%	3P%	FT%	RPG	APG	SPG	BPG	PPG
2020–21†	Milwaukee	30	2	9.1	.459	**.452**	.760	2.0	.2	**.5**	.2	5.7
2021–22	Milwaukee	**62**	**13**	19.1	.403	.348	.837	3.6	1.0	.4	**.3**	7.9
2022–23	Milwaukee	38	3	15.7	.386	.392	**.860**	3.1	1.0	.3	.2	6.0
2022–23	Indiana	24	11	**24.6**	**.476**	.422	.721	**4.7**	**2.1**	**.5**	**.3**	**13.0**
2023–24	Indiana	18	0	10.1	.451	.306	.818	1.8	1.0	.3	.1	5.2
2023–24	Toronto	34	1	15.6	.465	.347	.833	3.4	1.3	.6	.4	7.9
Career		206	30	16.3	.433	.376	.807	3.2	1.0	.4	.2	7.6

==== Playoffs ====
Year	Team	GP	GS	MPG	FG%	3P%	FT%	RPG	APG	SPG	BPG	PPG
2021†	Milwaukee	5	0	**6.2**	**.222**	**.250**	**.714**	**1.8**	.2	.0	**.2**	**3.0**
2022	Milwaukee	**8**	0	2.5	**.222**	.000	.000	.4	**.3**	.0	.0	.5
Career		13	0	3.9	.222	.167	.556	.9	.2	.0	.1	1.5

=== College ===
Year	Team	GP	GS	MPG	FG%	3P%	FT%	RPG	APG	SPG	BPG	PPG
2017–18	Louisville	28	0	12.0	**.464**	**.439**	.769	2.2	.4	.6	.1	5.7
2018–19	Louisville	**34**	29	31.9	.446	.374	.765	7.6	**1.3**	**.9**	**.4**	17.0
2019–20	Louisville	31	**30**	**33.1**	.440	.402	**.813**	**7.7**	**1.3**	.7	.3	**18.0**
Career		93	59	26.3	.445	.394	.785	6.0	1.0	.8	.2	13.9

== Personal life ==
Jordan Nwora is the first son of Amy Nwora and Alexander Nwora, the Erie Community College and Nigerian National Basketball Team head coach. His godfather is basketball coach Richard Jacob, who recruited his father from Nigeria to play for Daemen College in 1989.

His three siblings (Ronni, Caeli, and Lex) are also interested in basketball, with his sister Ronni Nwora having played for The Park School of Buffalo and Georgia Tech.

During the 2019 FIBA World Cup qualifier in Lagos, Jordan and his father Alexander became the first father and son to represent a Nigerian national team side at the same time.

== See also ==
- List of All-Atlantic Coast Conference men's basketball teams
