= Entranceways at Main Street at Lamarck Drive and Smallwood Drive =

- U.S. National Register of Historic Places
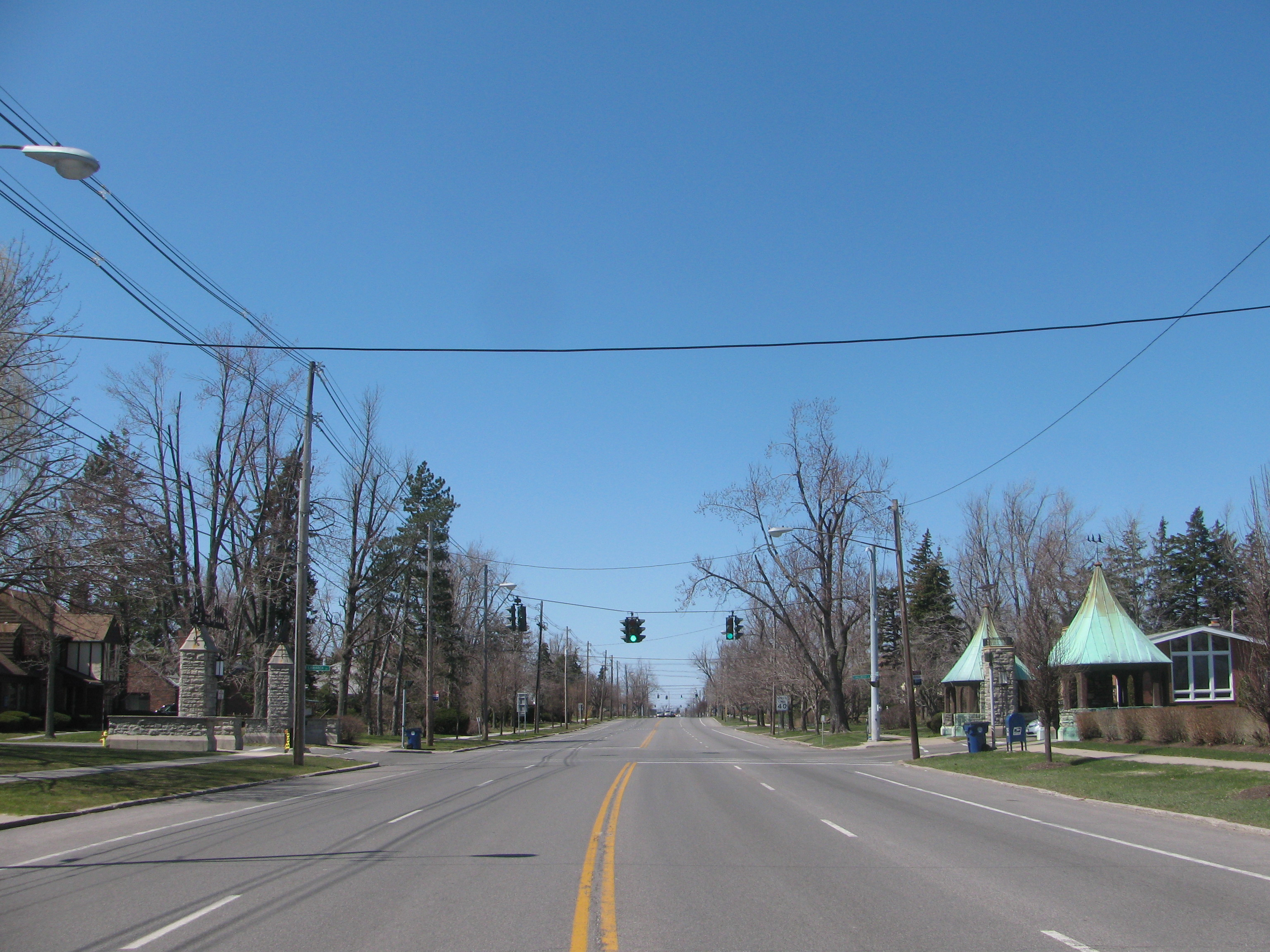
- Entranceways at Main Street at Lamarck Drive and Smallwood Drive from east, April 12, 2009

- Location within New York Location within the United States
- Location: Main St. at Lamarck Dr. and Smallwood Dr., Amherst, New York
- Coordinates: 42°57′45″N 78°46′27″W
- Built: 1926
- Architectural style: Tudor Revival
- MPS: Suburban Development of Buffalo, New York MPS
- NRHP reference No.: 05001379
- Added to NRHP: December 7, 2005

Entranceways at Main Street at Lamarck Drive and Smallwood Drive are a set of complementary residential subdivision stone entranceways built in 1926. They are located on Main Street (New York State Route 5) in the hamlet of Snyder, New York within the town of Amherst, which is located in Erie County. These entranceways are markers representing the American suburbanization of rural areas through land development associated with transportation on the edges of urban developments. The Smallwood entranceway is a pair of symmetric groupings of stone gatehouses and posts flanking the two sides of the drive at Main Street. The Lamarck entranceway is a pair of Y-shaped and U-shaped stone half-walls flanking the two sides of the drive at Main Street. The entranceways were added to the National Register of Historic Places on December 7, 2005.

== History ==
Williamsville developed around a mill that was erected in 1811 and the town of Amherst was born in 1818. At that time Main Street served as the main link from Williamsville and Amherst to Buffalo. Main Street was displaced as "the unchallenged main artery of Amherst and Western New York" by the Erie Canal in 1825 and later by adjacent railroads. By 1866, Buffalo Street Railway Company built a street car system that ran on Main Street from Amherst to Buffalo. Daily stage coach service also began in 1866 along Main Street and continued until it was displaced by an electric trolley in 1893, the track ran 4.5 miles (7.2 km) from Main and Bailey Avenue (U.S. Route 62 in New York) to the east with stops that included Entranceways at Main Street at Lamarck Drive and Smallwood Drive.

The early 20th-century estate era gave way to the residential subdivision era. The subdivisions in suburban Buffalo took on an urban flavor along the area's main thoroughfares and paths of migration. Charles S. Burkhardt began Audubon Terrace on 400 acres north of Main Street in October 1919 on the Taylor and Satterfield Estates. In May 1923, Burkhardt began to create 585 lots south of Main Street extending to Wehrle Drive on the former Witmer Farm property.

== Location ==
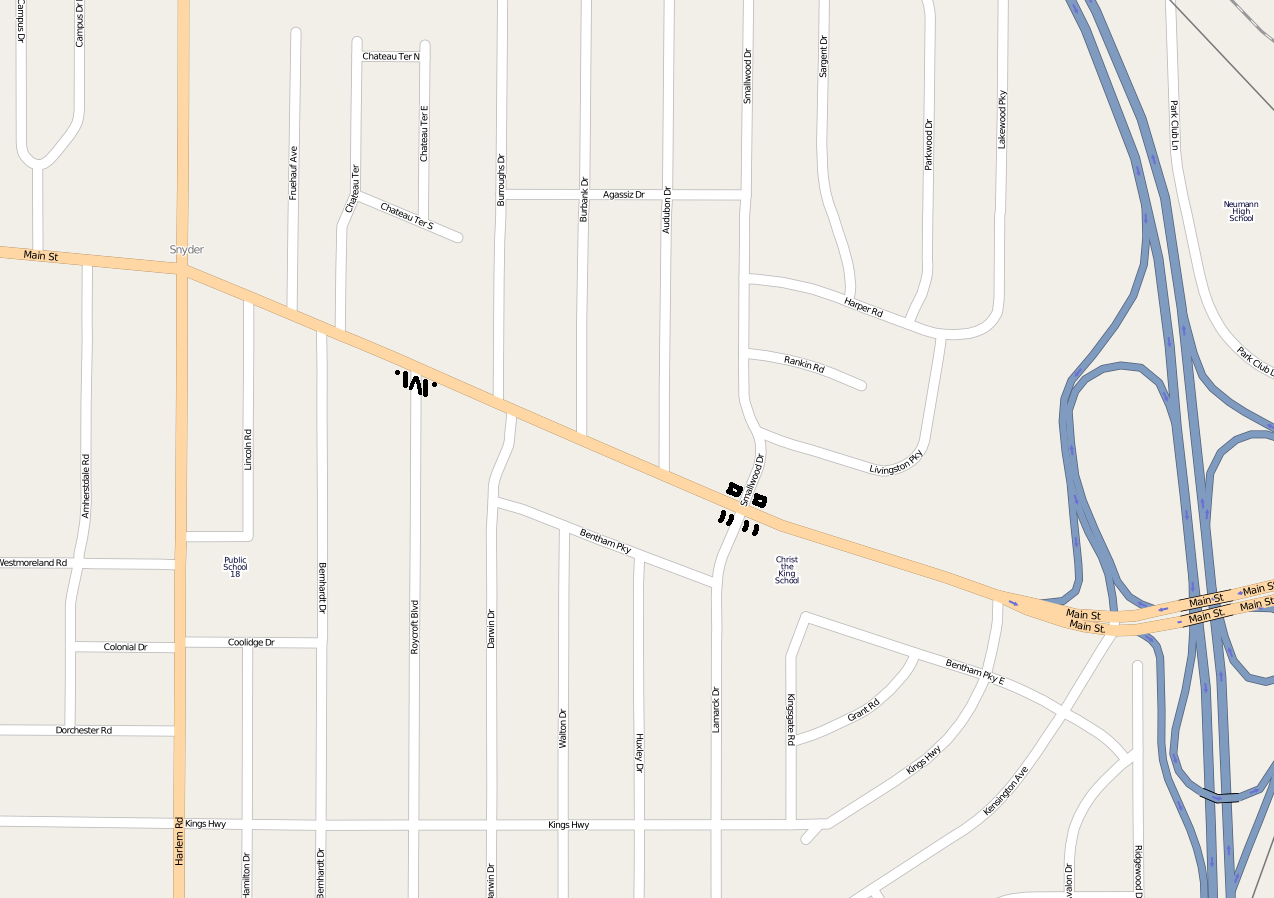
Snyder, NY's National Register of Historic Places Entranceways at Lamarck Drive and Smallwood Drive and Roycroft Boulevard were added in to the register in 2005. Later other entranceways were added to the register.

Main Street is a four-lane road running east–west connecting Williamsville (the other side of Interstate 290 (I-290), known as the Youngman Expressway) to points westward such as the neighboring hamlet of Eggertsville and downtown Buffalo. The entranceways are located proximately to large residential lawns of surrounding houses in the 1920s-built subdivisions. From the junction with the I-290 heading west, the first intersection (after the adjacent Main Street and Kensington intersection) is a four-way light where it meets Lamarck Drive from the south and Smallwood Drive from the north. Both streets serve two way traffic. The entranceways sit on the four corners of this intersection.

== Architecture ==
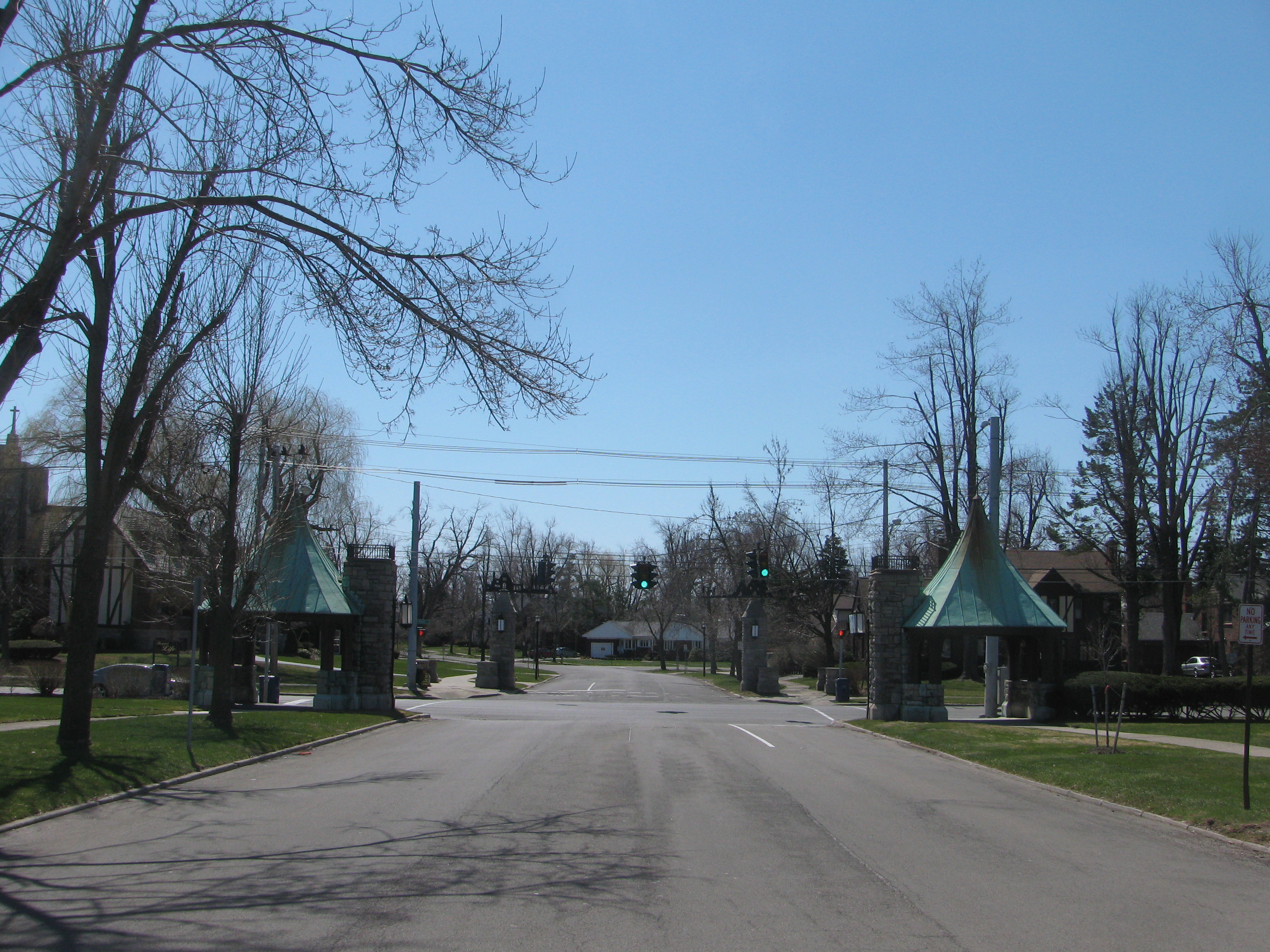
View from north of Main Street

=== Smallwood Drive ===
Both of the Smallwood Drive groupings of stones on the north side of Main Street have dominant octagonal gatehouses built upon four pairs of stained heavy timber columns supported by quarry-faced random ashlar half-walls on cut stone chamfered bases. The bases flank Smallwood Drive's concrete parallel sidewalks run along through the centerline of the gatehouses. The Main Street sidewalk passes in front of the gatehouses. The columns are braced with heavy timber lintel on open sides supported by pegged heavy timber brackets that form a lancet-head arch. The structures are topped by steeply-pitched and flared standing seam copper roofs that have weathervanes that are located nearly two stories above the street land grading and that depict flying birds.

The Smallwood Drive gatehouse sides have tall and slightly tapered quarry-faced random ashlar stone posts with chamfered corners on stone bases. These posts support flat cast capitals beneath wrought iron balustrades with filigreed corners. The structures still host original hexagonal metal and glass light fixtures that hang from metal brackets on the Smallwood Drive post faces. The pair of groupings has Tudor Revival architectural influences.

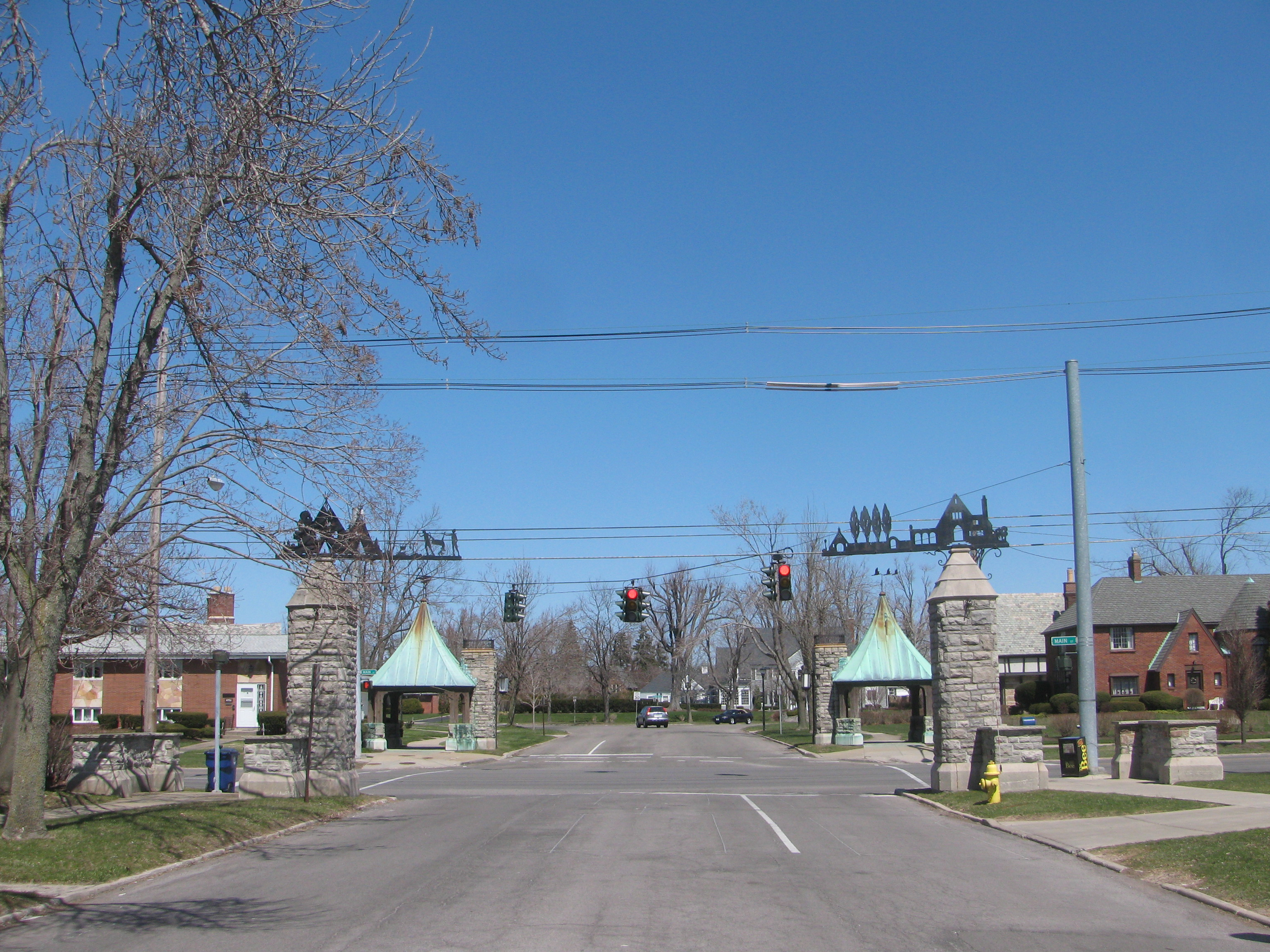
View from south of Main Street

=== Lamarck Drive ===
Both of the Lamarck Drive groupings of stones on the south side of Main Street are composed of a pair of symmetric stone structures flanking the drive. Each stone grouping features a tall capped, stone post topped by a large cut metal pictorial sign. The posts have flanking stone Y-shaped half-walls parallel to the drive. These half-walls have corresponding block U-shaped half-walls that along with the Y-shaped half-walls jointly form a square through which new concrete sidewalks run along Lamarck Drive. The design also has Tudor Revival influences in concert with the surrounding residences.

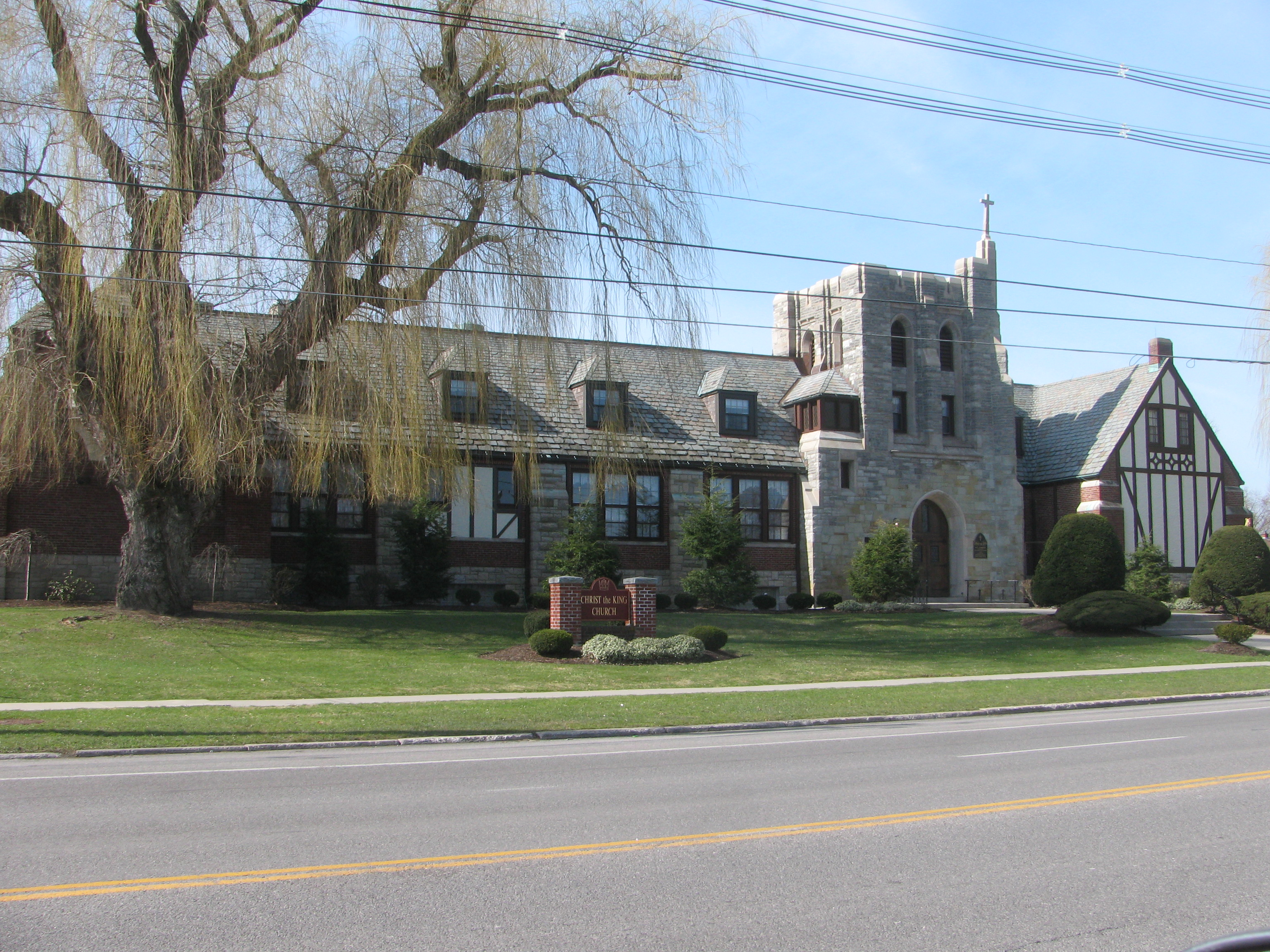
Christ the King Church is on the eastern side of the Lamarck Drive corner on Main Street

The posts have 4 by 4 feet (1.2 m × 1.2 m) bases and stand 12 feet (3.7 m) in height, while the half walls stand approximately 4 feet (1.2 m). Both structures are made of quarry-faced random ashlar limestone on a cut and smooth finished chamfer stone base. The posts have chamfered edges. The posts include randomly located tan- and brown-colored granite blocks. Similar blocks are at the top and midpoints of the half-walls. The half-walls are coped with recently installed rectangular cut and finished stone slabs that have rough cut edges protruding over the half-walls. An octagonal pyramid of three sequentially smaller cast concrete courses with slightly flared edges cap the posts. The Main Street post faces have the original hexagonal metal and glass light fixtures hanging from metal hooks, while only the hooks remain on the Lamarck faces.

Atop the posts are signs of painted metal panels with silhouette depictions braced below by filigree metal brackets. The signs are 11 feet (3.4 m) in length and 3.5 feet (1.1 m) in height. They neither match nor mirror each other. The west sign depicts a Native American domestic scene including trees, teepees, a camp fire with trestle, and figures carrying a deer from a pole. The east sign depicts Tudor Revival architecture. Christ the King Church is located at 30 Lamarck Drive at Main Street on the southeastern corner. The other three corners are residential addresses.

== Legacy ==
The entryways remain in their original location, retain original design, setting, and materials. The entranceways continue to serve their original functions of marking the vehicular and pedestrian entrance to the subdivision. The eastern Smallwood Drive entrance provides shelter for Niagara Frontier Transportation Authority Metro Bus riders heading west toward the Buffalo Metro Rail and downtown Buffalo, New York. The residential dwellings adjacent to the entrances are original and the setting has had no known changes since the widening of Main Street in the 1920s. Charles S. Burkhardt purchased the land for the Audubon Terrace (Smallwood side) and Audubon Terrace South (Lamarck side) subdivisions that these entranceways have marked since their 1926 construction. The entranceways are in fair condition despite perceptible light fixture changes and shoddy repairs. Trayfield Corporation, which has little known history, is the builder of the circa 1925 shelter entranceways and subdivision according to what is known about them.

These entranceways are significant as relatively rare structures associated with the transformation of the formerly rural Town of Amherst into a residential suburban Buffalo community known as the hamlet of Snyder. They represent the American suburbanization of rural areas through land development associated with transportation on the edges of urban developments. They are symbolic of the marketed character of the residential developments as a desirable residential alternative to urban life. The entranceways were added to the National Register of Historic Places on December 7, 2005.

== See also ==
- National Register of Historic Places listings in Erie County, New York
