= Snyder, New York =

Snyder
- Hamlet
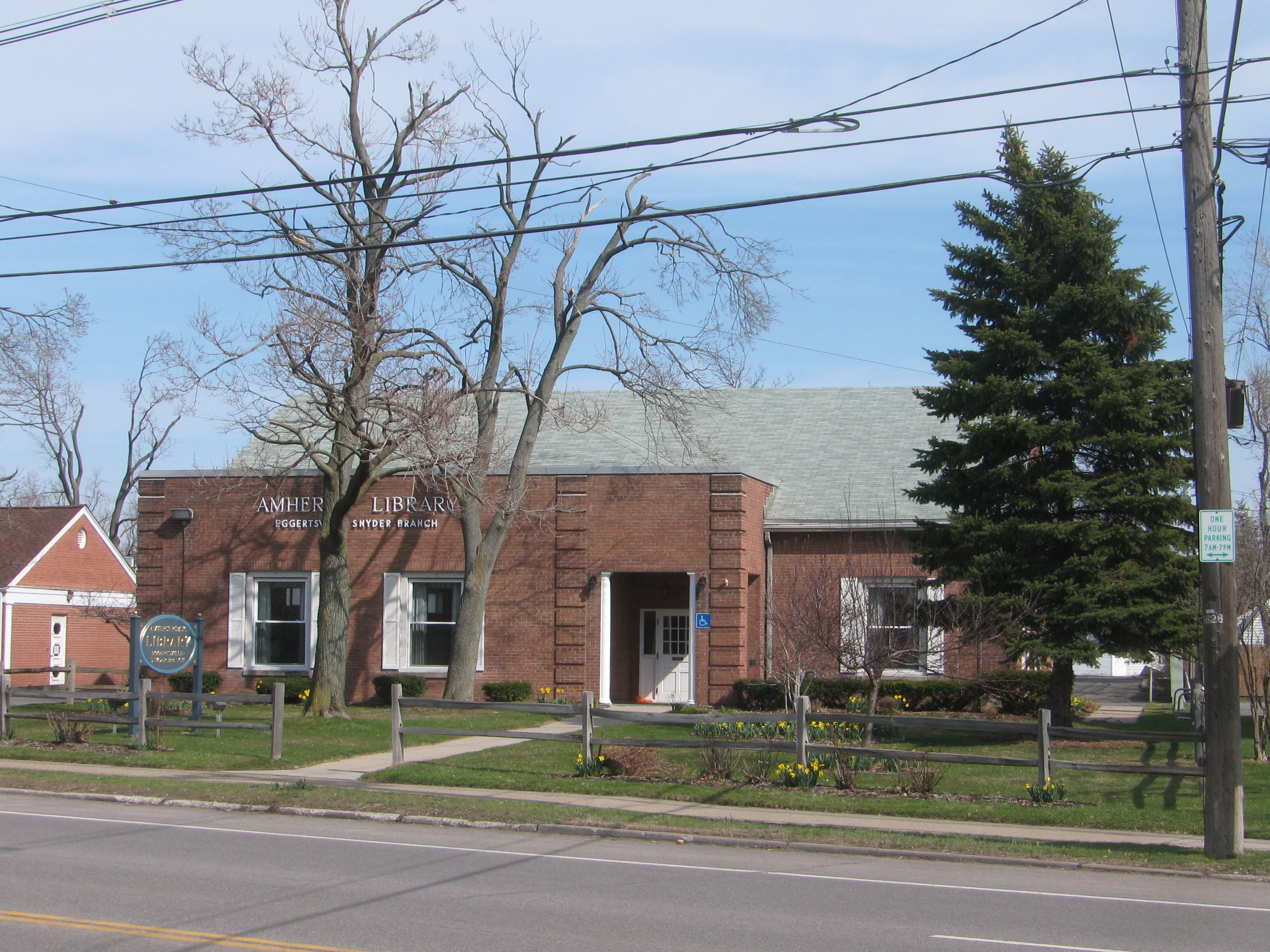
- The Eggertsville-Snyder branch of the Buffalo & Erie County Public Library in the Snyder, New York "Business District"
- Interactive map of Snyder
- Coordinates: 42°57′48.39″N 78°47′2.36″W
- Country: United States
- State: New York
- County: Erie County
- hamlet: 1837
- Elevation: 673 ft (205 m)

Population (2000)
  - Total: 13,875
- Time zone: UTC-5 (EST)
  - Summer (DST): UTC-4 (EDT)
- ZIP code: 14226 (and part of 14221 & 14225)
- Area code: 716
- Average Household income: $87,700
- Average Household size: 2.49

Snyder (originally Snyderville) is a hamlet within the town of Amherst in Erie County, New York, that is part of the Buffalo–Niagara Falls metropolitan area. The hamlet was established in 1837. It was named for Michael Snyder, its first postmaster, who also operated a store at the corner of Harlem Road, which is also known as New York State Route 240, and Main Street, which is also known as New York State Route 5. The hamlet blossomed due to retail activity demand created along the Main Street transportation route between Buffalo and points to the east in the 19th and early 20th century.

As of 2009, the hamlet had several commercial districts, including a modest business district along Main Street that includes the original town focal point at Main Street and Harlem Road, and several educational institutions. The educational institutions are both public and private and range from kindergarten through college. The Snyder community has above-average affluence and education compared to the Buffalo region. The hamlet also hosts two structures listed on the National Register of Historic Places that serve as architectural artifacts of the early residential developments in the hamlet.

The traditional definition of the hamlet is the "Snyder" postal service area, now merged into the 14226 zip code. However, using United States Census Bureau-based data, which does not necessarily align exactly with the old postal boundaries, the modern definition includes parts of the neighboring Eggertsville hamlet.

== History ==
Snyder Business District
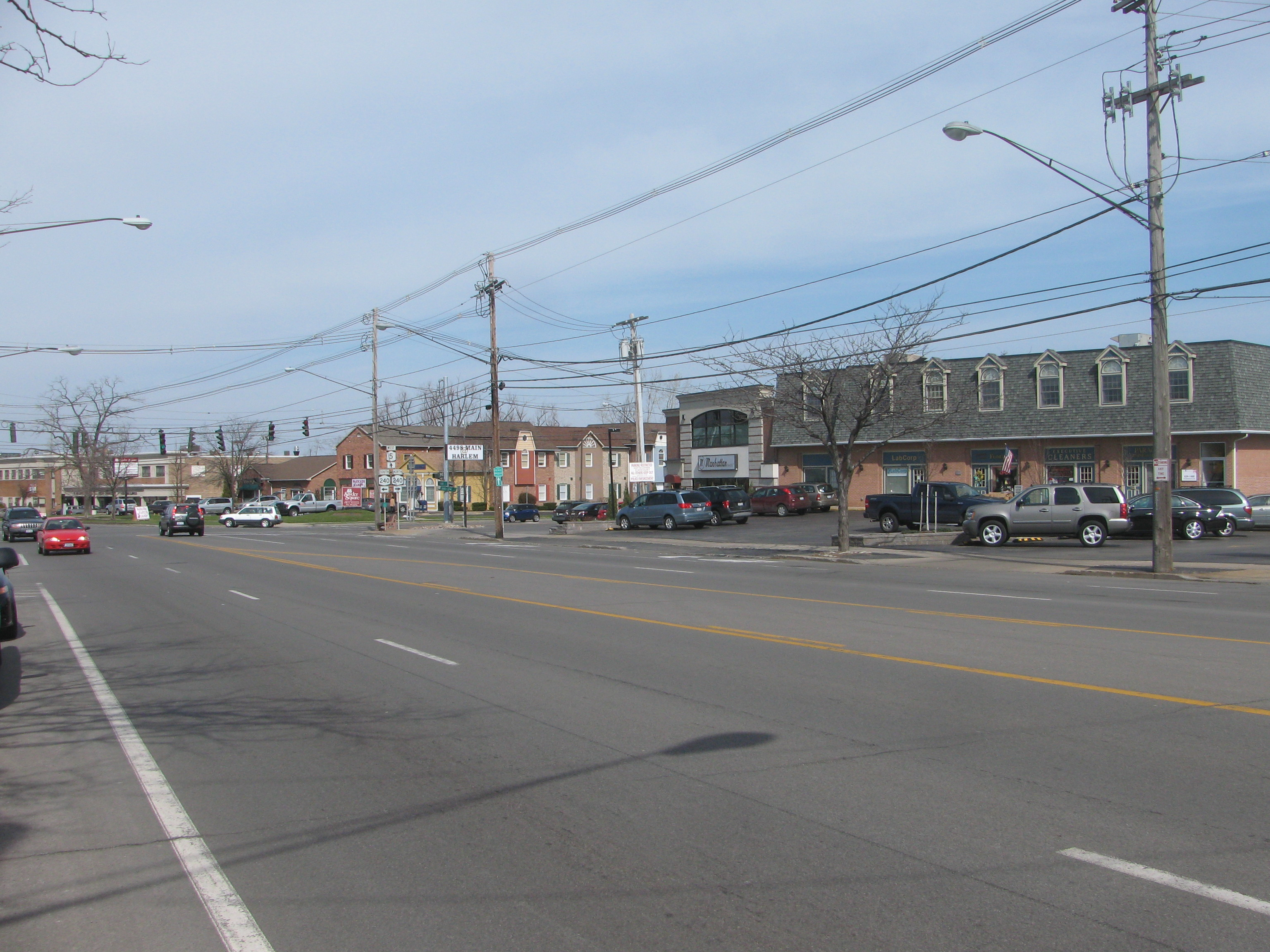
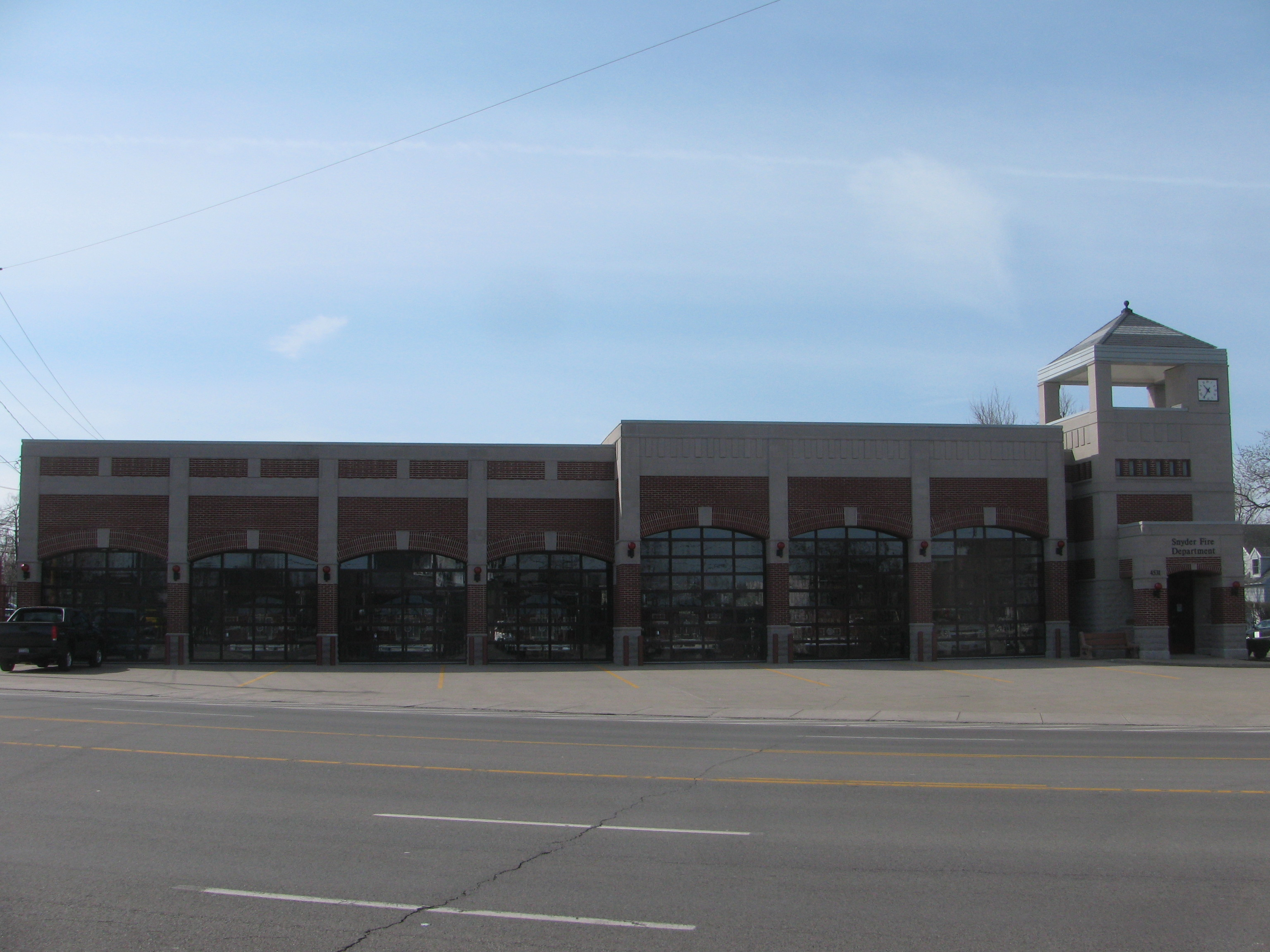
The Main Street (NYS Route 5) and Harlem Road (NYS Route 240) intersection and Snyder fire department

In 1804, Timothy Hopkins was the first settler in the area that would later become Snyderville and subsequently Snyder. Hopkins married Nancy Kerr in Williamsville in the first marriage on record in Erie County. As newlyweds, they moved to a log cabin on a farm on the 4301 Main Street location of Amherst Central High School. The Schenck family moved to Amherst at the corner of Main Street and Harlem Road in 1821. Abraham Snyder arrived from Pennsylvania in 1823 and moved to a spacious frame house in the late 1830s. His son Michael rose to prominence. John Schenck, Michael Snyder's cousin, built the hamlet's first house and later built the first store in 1837, which was the year the hamlet was first established.

In 1830, a stagecoach was established. It was the first regularly scheduled public means of transportation between Buffalo and Batavia, and sometimes Albany, and operated along Buffalo Road, which was later renamed Main Street. By the 1850s, the Amherst economy thrived on agriculture. Snyder also had a pottery and brick factory. Throughout the 19th Century Snyder evolved as a small scale business community catering to surrounding farmers and the stagecoach line along Main Street. In 1879, the hamlets of Amherst began receiving newspaper service from the Amherst Bee, which continues to exist as of the beginning of the 21st century as a weekly newspaper. L. F. Crout opened a hotel in 1883.

In 1892, an electric trolley, which ran from Main Street and Bailey Avenue, also known as U.S. Route 62, into Williamsville, connected Amherst with the city of Buffalo's streetcar system. This made Amherst's various hamlets more accessible and desirable to the wealthier city residents who were interested in expanding their estates into the "country". This caused growth and development of the Main and Harlem area which served as the center of town for the new suburbs. In 1905, the Snyderville Fire burned 12 buildings in the Main Street/Harlem Road area, including blacksmith shops, barns, and other businesses critical to the Snyder economy as well as livestock and stores of grain. In the 1920s, the town of Amherst began to develop by converting farmland into subdivisions. Snyder residents began to live closer to each other in new subdivisions.

== Geography ==
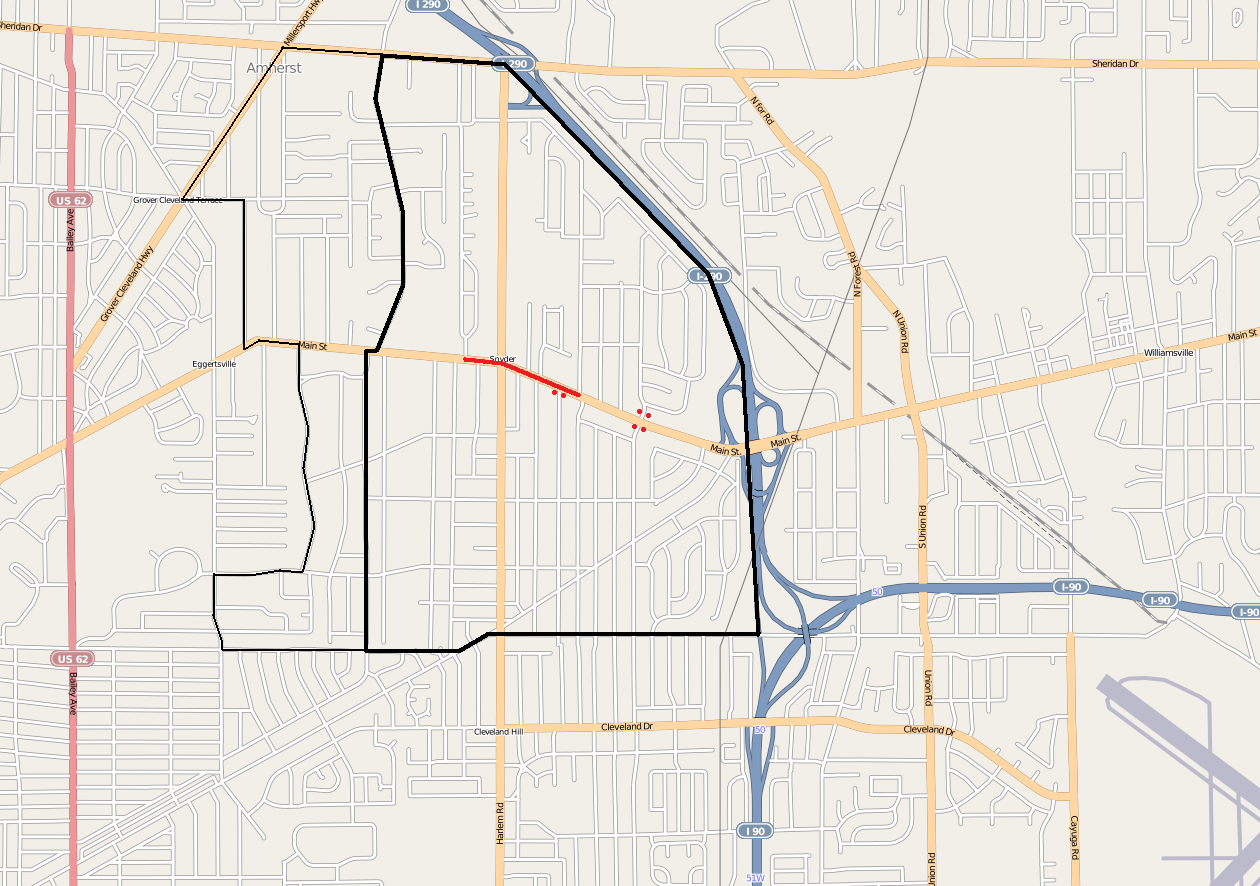
Snyder map with postal service-based boundaries in bold black, census-based boundaries in black, business district in red, and National Register of Historic Places listings as red dots

Snyder is located in the southern part of Amherst, which is located in Erie County. As a hamlet it has no formal boundaries, but was originally defined by the area served by its post office. The traditional boundaries of the hamlet are Getzville and Brantwood Road on the west, Sheridan Drive, also known as New York State Route 324, on the north, I-290, known as the Youngmann Expressway/I-90, known as New York State Thruway on the east, and the Cheektowaga town line along Wehrle Drive east of Harlem Road and then Winspear Avenue on the south.

When defining the Snyder community market area using census data, the western boundary extends a little further to include parts of the hamlet of Eggertsville, which was built around the Main Street and Eggert Road intersection, with a western boundary from north to south of Millersport Highway, also known as New York State Route 263, Longmeadow Road, Westfield Road, Main Street, LeBrun Road, and Eggert Road. When defined this way, Snyder includes (using a Main Street and Harlem Road origin, starting with the northwest quadrant, and moving clockwise) census block groups 1–3 from census tract 94.01; census block groups 3 & 4 from census tract 94.02; census block groups 3–5 from census tract 95.02; and census block groups 1, 3–5 from census tract 95.01. The center of town at Main Street and Harlem is at an elevation of 673 feet (205 m).

The business district is located between Burroughs Drive to the east and Campus Drive to the west on Main Street. In this region, the Snyder Fire Department, the Eggertsville-Snyder Branch of the Buffalo & Erie County Public Library (4622 Main Street), and the Main Harlem Plaza as well as the former location of the United States Postal Service office for the 14226 zip code that includes Snyder and the neighboring hamlet of Eggertsville are located. The post office for the zip code was formerly located at Main Street and Chateau Terrace with a 25 Chateau Terrace address until May 1, 1990.

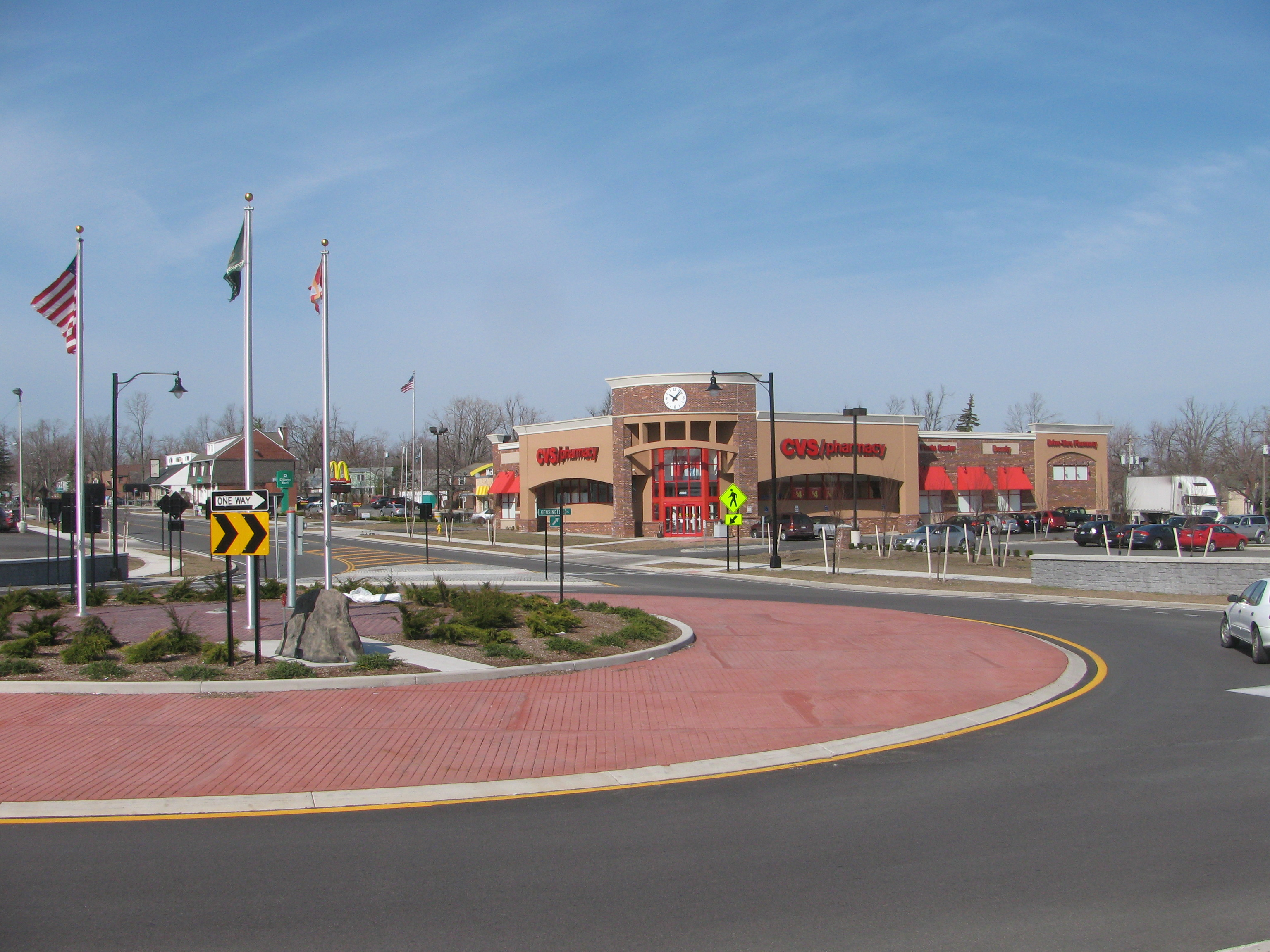
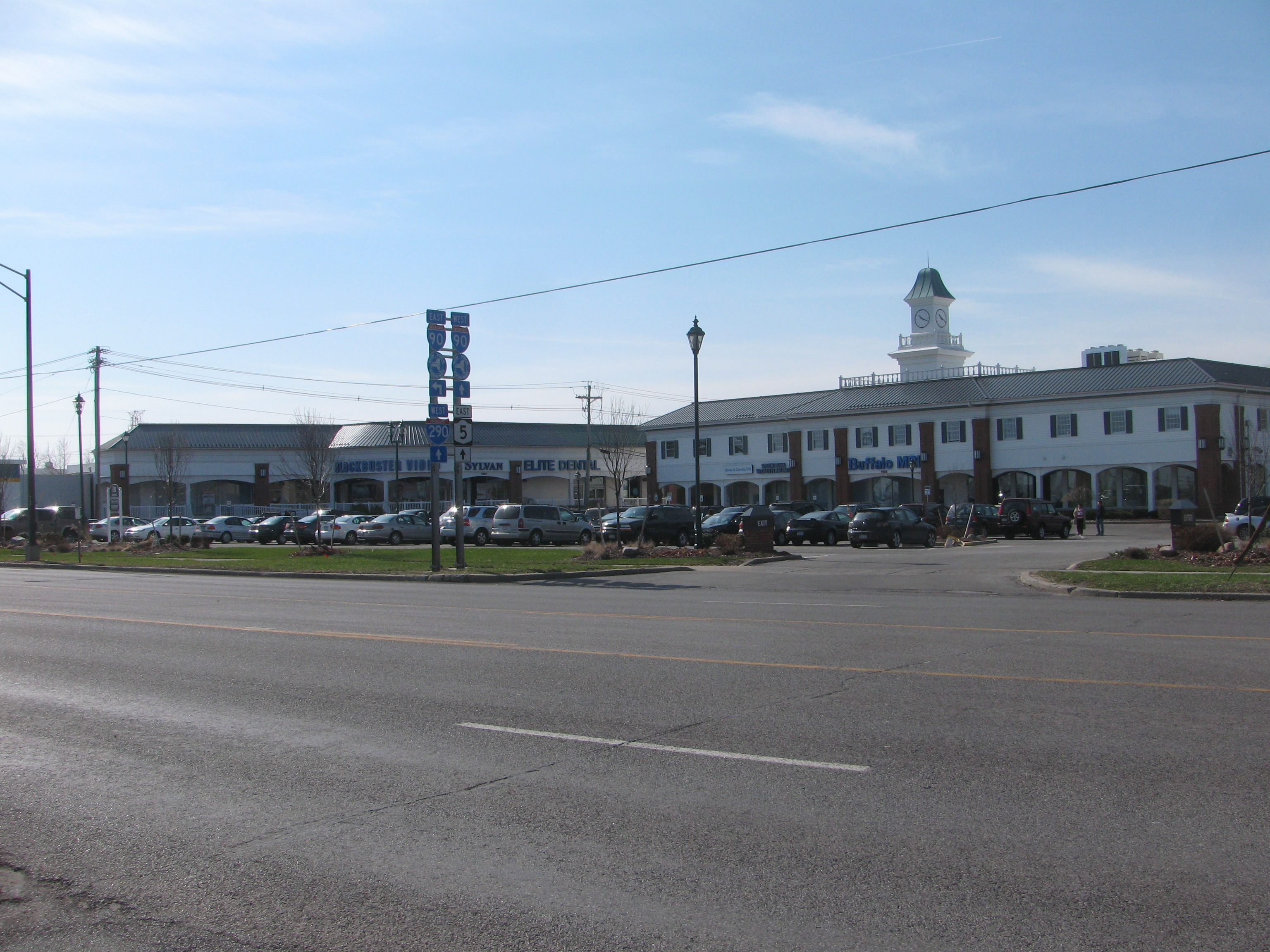
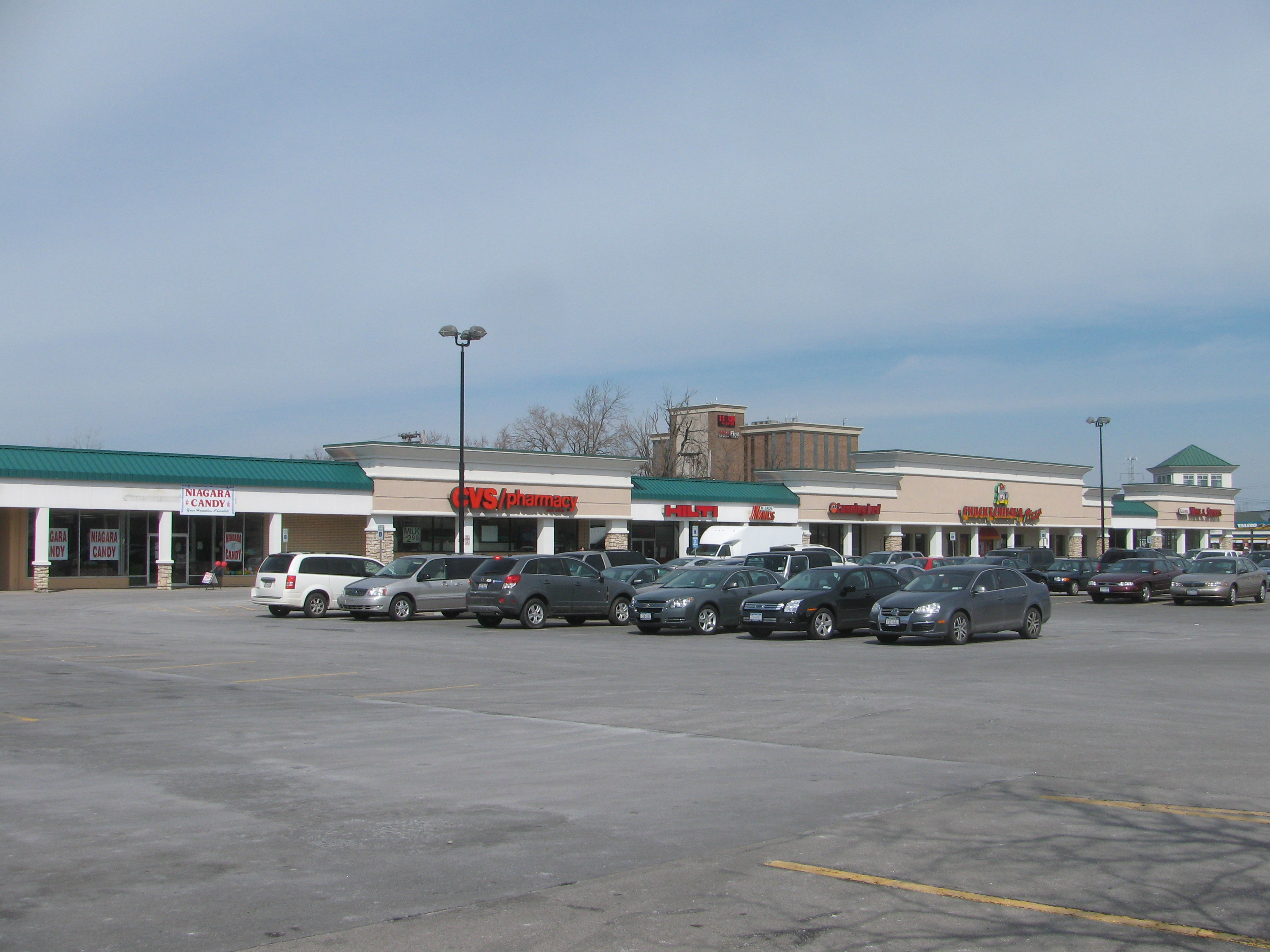
Kensington-Harlem, Main-Kensington, and Sheridan-Harlem commercial districts

Harlem road crosses through the business district and connects three of the hamlet's four commercial districts. Sheridan Harlem Plaza and adjacent commercial property are located at the north end of Harlem. Both Kensington Avenue and Wehrle Drive intersect the southern part of the Snyder portion of Harlem in a commercial region that extends into Cheektowaga. The Harlem–Kensington commercial district is historic. The fourth commercial district is located in the eastern edge of the hamlet at the intersection of Main Street and Kensington Avenue near the entrance to the Youngmann Expressway. The extended Snyder community has additional commercial areas along the highly commercial Sheridan Drive and on Millersport Highway.

== Transportation ==
Snyder is bounded by I-290, and has two interchanges on the eastern edge of the hamlet with this interstate highway that are both less than a 1 mile (1.6 km) from the Main and Harlem center of town. This provides direct access to the I-90 (The New York State Thruway) and continuing south on Harlem to the New York State Route 33 a little more than a mile from Snyder through Cheektowaga also provides access to the I-90. The community is also serviced by the Niagara Frontier Transportation Authority (NFTA), which provides three different bus routes (30, 48, and 49) connecting directly to the light rail Buffalo Metro Rail along Main Street to the west. All three of these routes connect to various parts of Williamsville to the east and provide connections to Erie Community College (north campus), the Buffalo Niagara International Airport and Transit Road (New York State Route 78). The hamlet is also serviced by NFTA route 65 from downtown Buffalo along Kensington Avenue to Main Street and the service continues to northeast Erie County destinations.

Historically, transportation through town has been active on Main Street. In 1836, the street became a Macadam toll road. On April 5, 1893, the trolley line opened for business between Main Street and Bailey Avenue and the east end of Williamsville 4.5 miles (7.2 km) to the east. It was later extended another 3 miles to Transit road.

== Landmarks ==
Snyder National Register of Historic Places listings
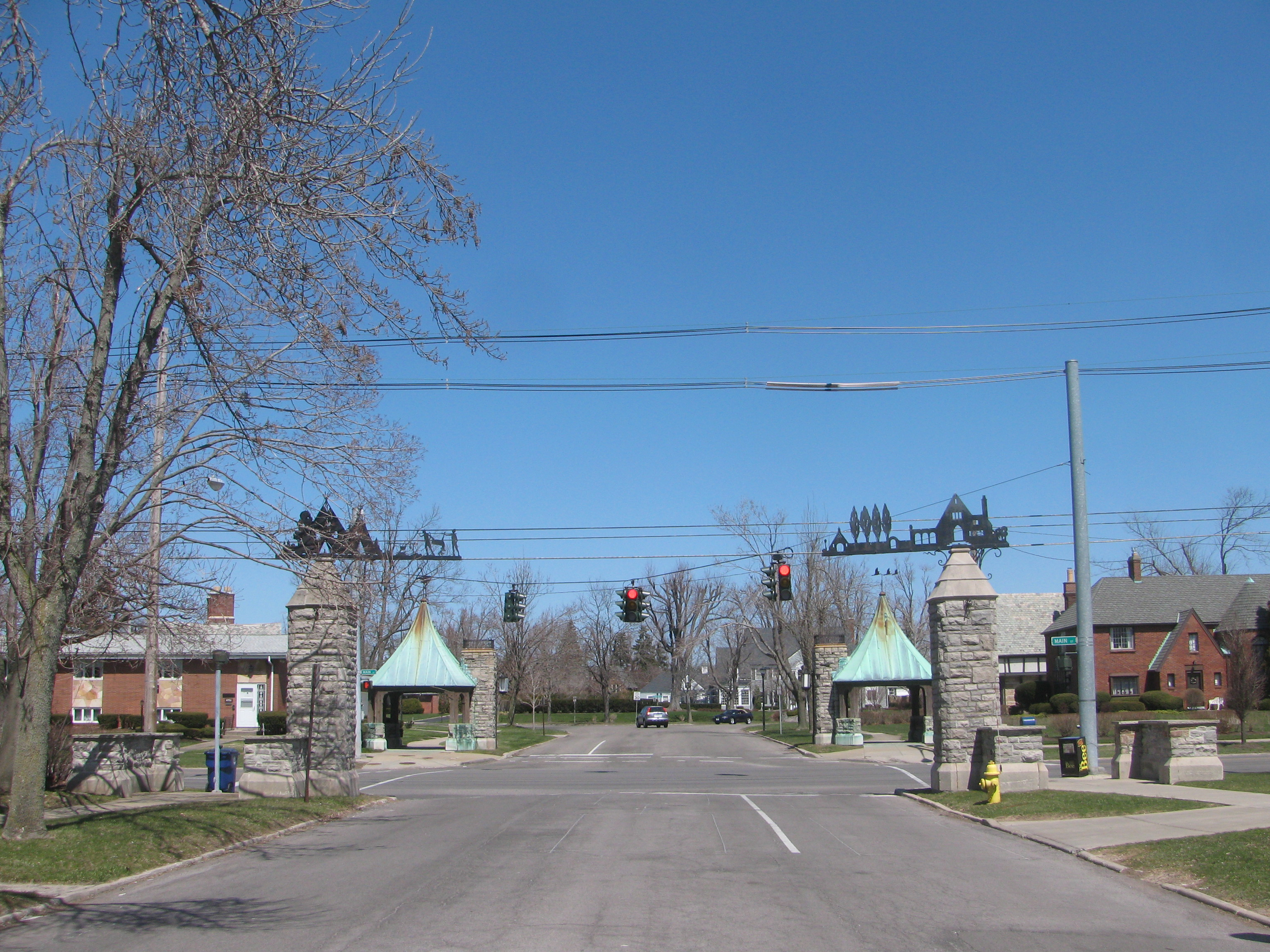
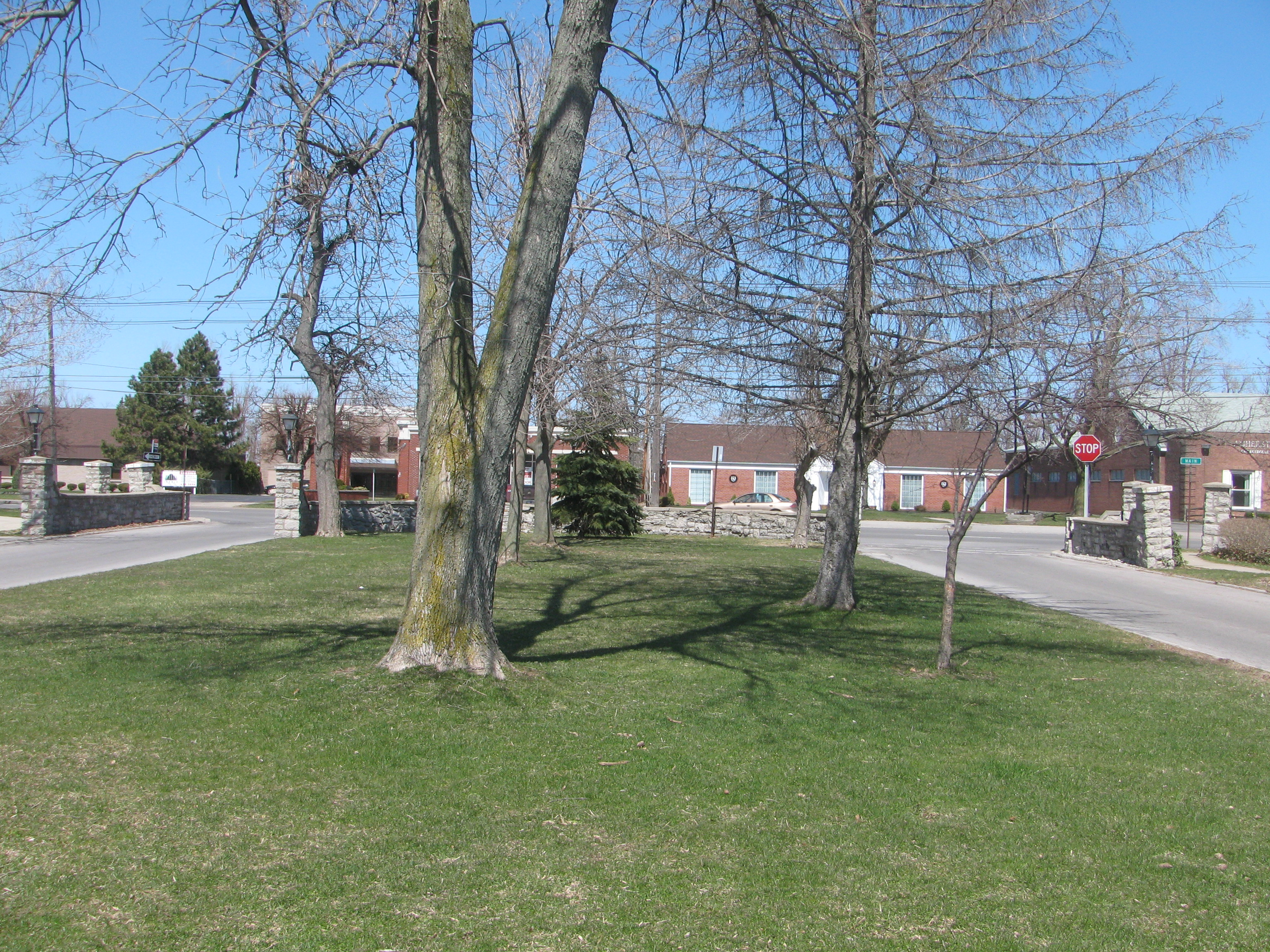
left: Entranceways at Main Street at Lamarck Drive and Smallwood Drive and right: Entranceway at Main Street at Roycroft Boulevard

The hamlet has two National Register of Historic Places listings: Entranceways at Main Street at Lamarck Drive and Smallwood Drive and Entranceway at Main Street at Roycroft Boulevard. The former were built in 1926 and the latter in 1918. Both were added to the National Register of Historic Places on December 7, 2005. These stone wall entrances to residential developments are common throughout Eggertsville and Snyder along Main Street and serve to give residential developments the appearance of having entrances similar to the former grand estates that were previously common along Main Street in the area.

Willard Genrich built the Lord Amherst Motor Hotel on Main Street near the I-290 interchange on Main Street to harmonize with the colonial architectural motif used by the local Main Street businesses.

== Economy ==
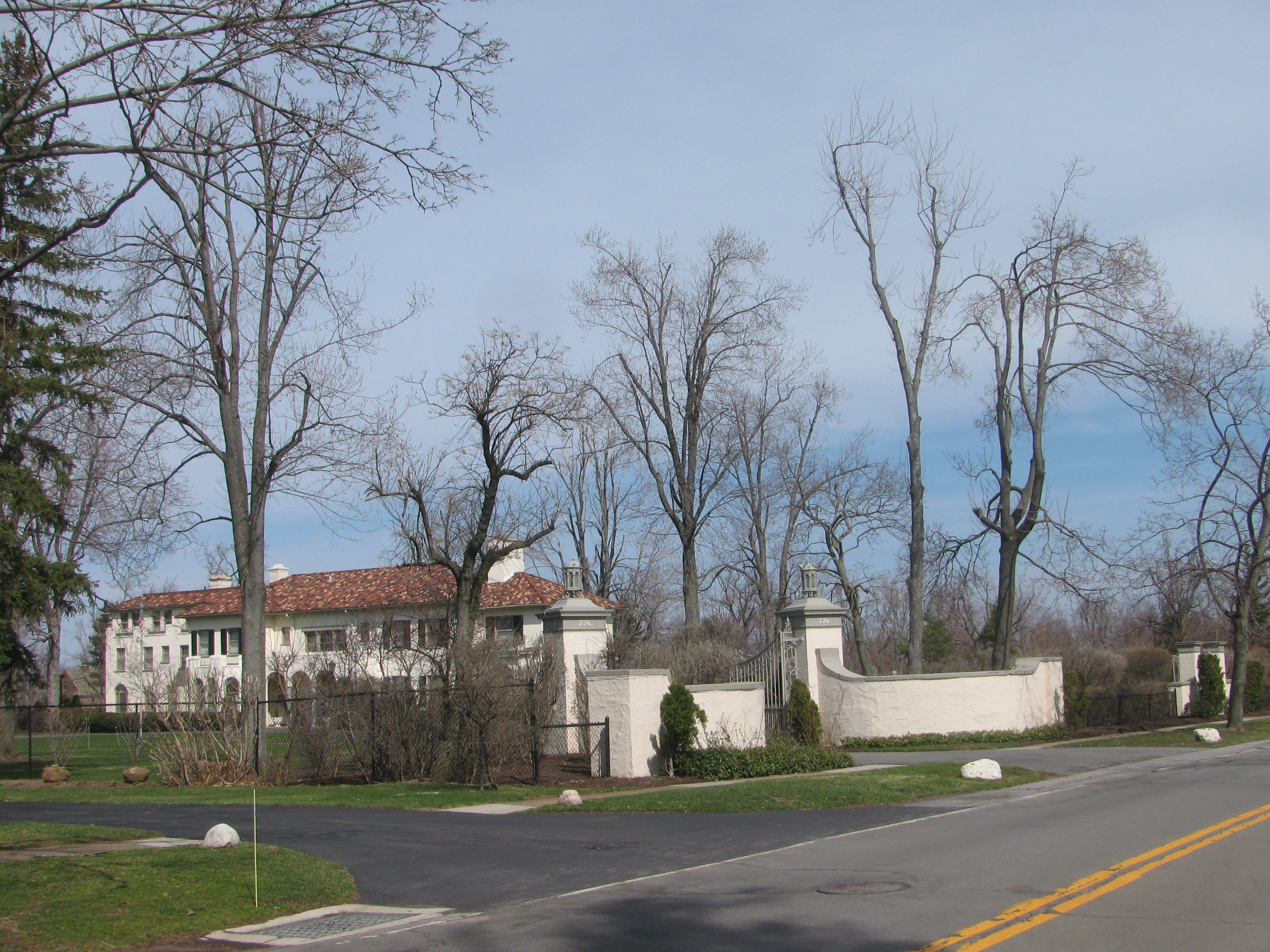
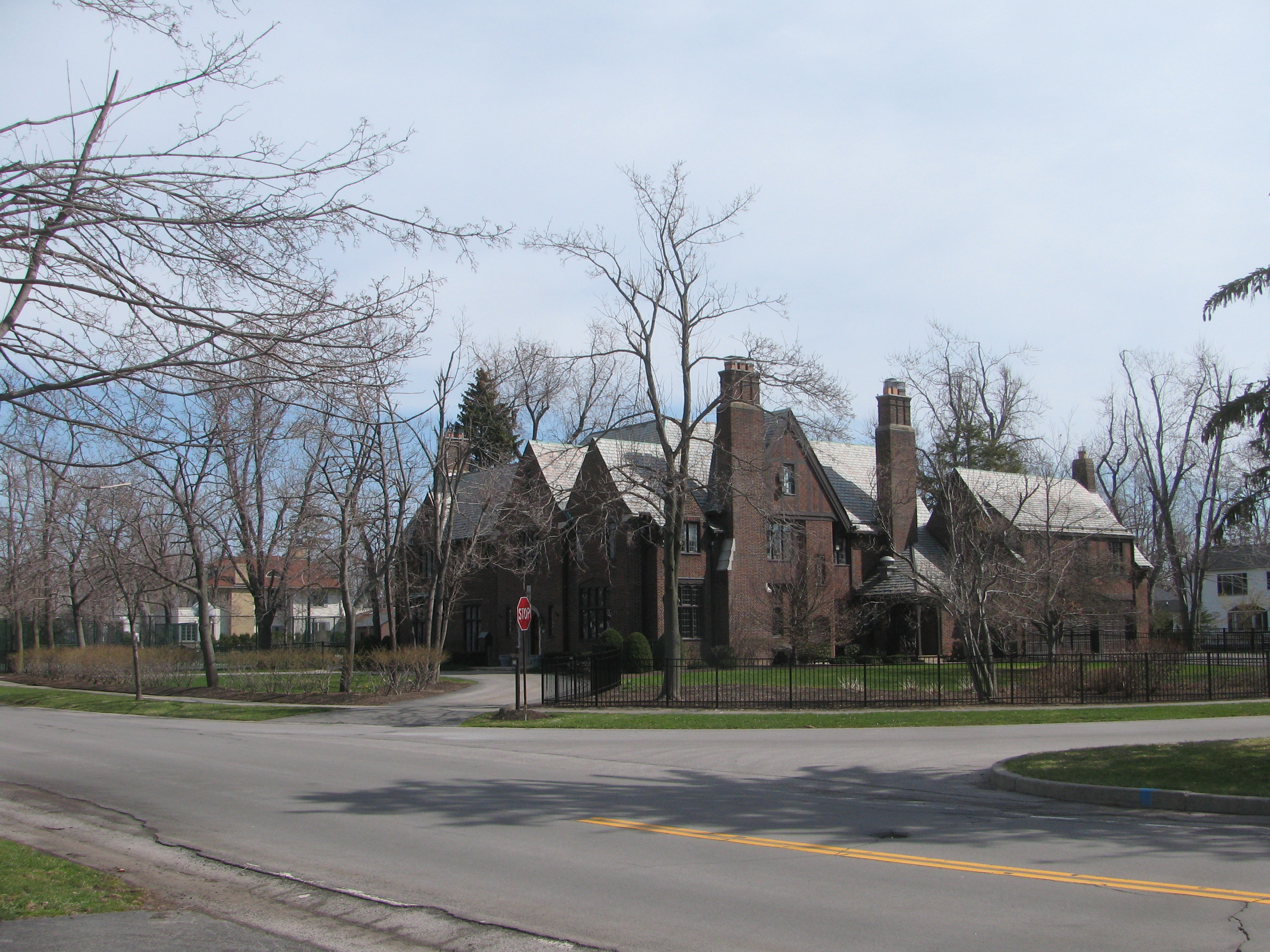
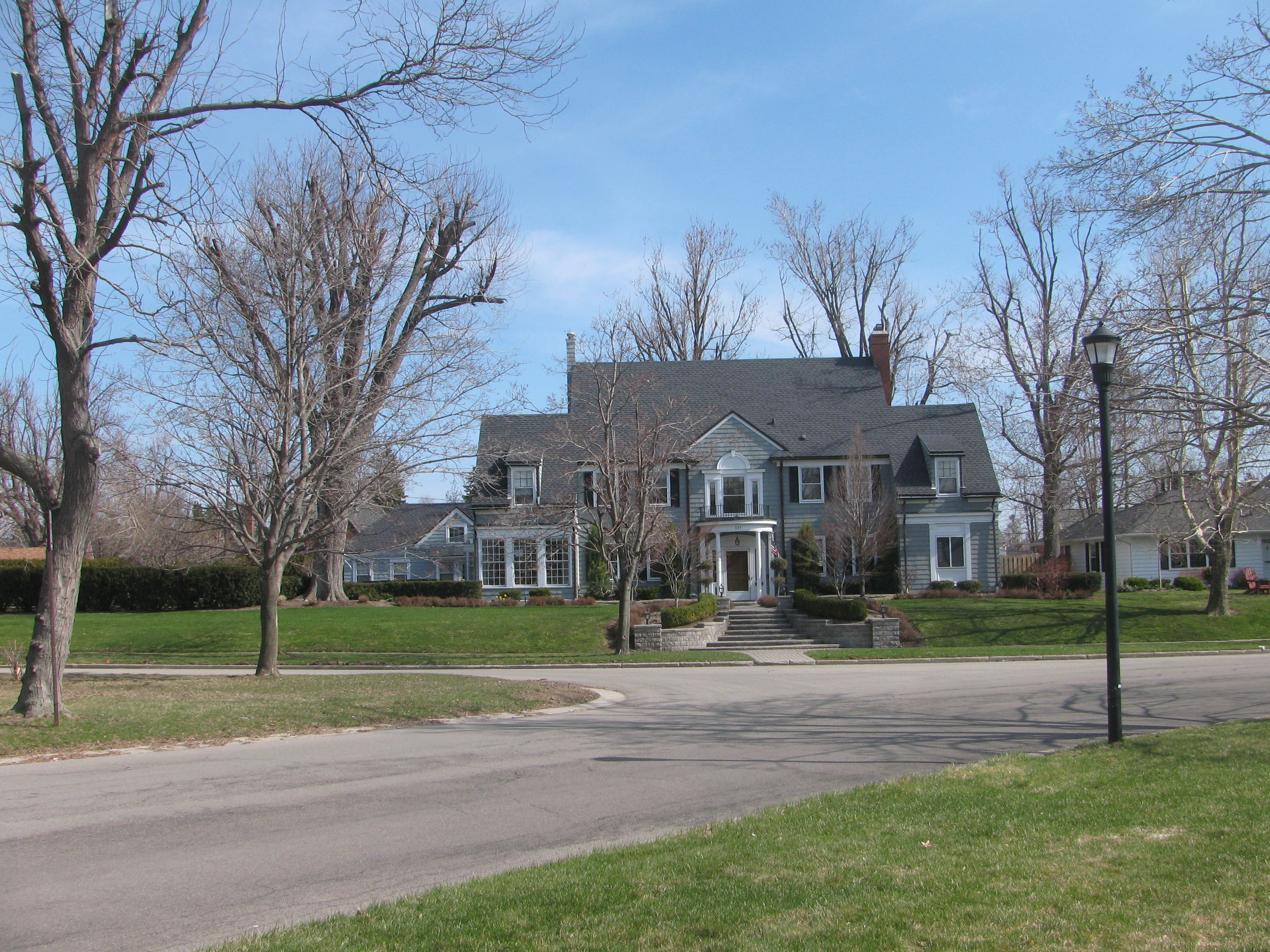
Southwest quadrant's LeBrun Road (top and center) and northeast Livingston (bottom) represent Snyder's affluence.

Snyder is an affluent and well-educated community in Metropolitan Buffalo. The residential population consists mostly of large single family homes on individual lots. The 2000 United States census average household income of $87,700 ($163,961 today) far exceeds the Buffalo regional average of $57,400 ($107,313). The Snyder population declined from 14,294 to 13,875 while the number of households increased from 5,469 to 5,574 between the 1990 United States census and the 2000 United States census. During the decade the number of children age 5–17 and adults age 35–54 grew significantly while the young adults age 18–34 and adults over the age of 55 declined sharply. The number of housing units grew from 5,662 to 5,739. 1990 housing was 82.5% single-family housing. The busiest ATM in the entire Buffalo region is in Snyder.

The traditionally defined Snyder portion of Main Street had 180 businesses as of January 2002. The town has two theatres: MusicalFare Theatre, a not for profit corporation on the Daemen College campus, and ComedySportz Buffalo.

Starting in the 1950s zoning laws required that all new buildings be set back from the street and have private on-site parking. The 21st Century zoning laws date back to 1976.

== Government ==
There is no formal Snyder government. The hamlet, like the rest of the town of Amherst, is served by the Town of Amherst Government and receives municipal services from the town. It is serviced by entities such as the Amherst Police Department, Snyder fire department and the Town of Amherst Highway Department, although Main Street and Harlem Road are serviced by the New York State Department of Transportation. Residents of Amherst, including those in Snyder, pay taxes both to the Town of Amherst and the County of Erie. However, the town tax is solely a school tax and the county collects the remaining town taxes for municipal services.

== Education ==
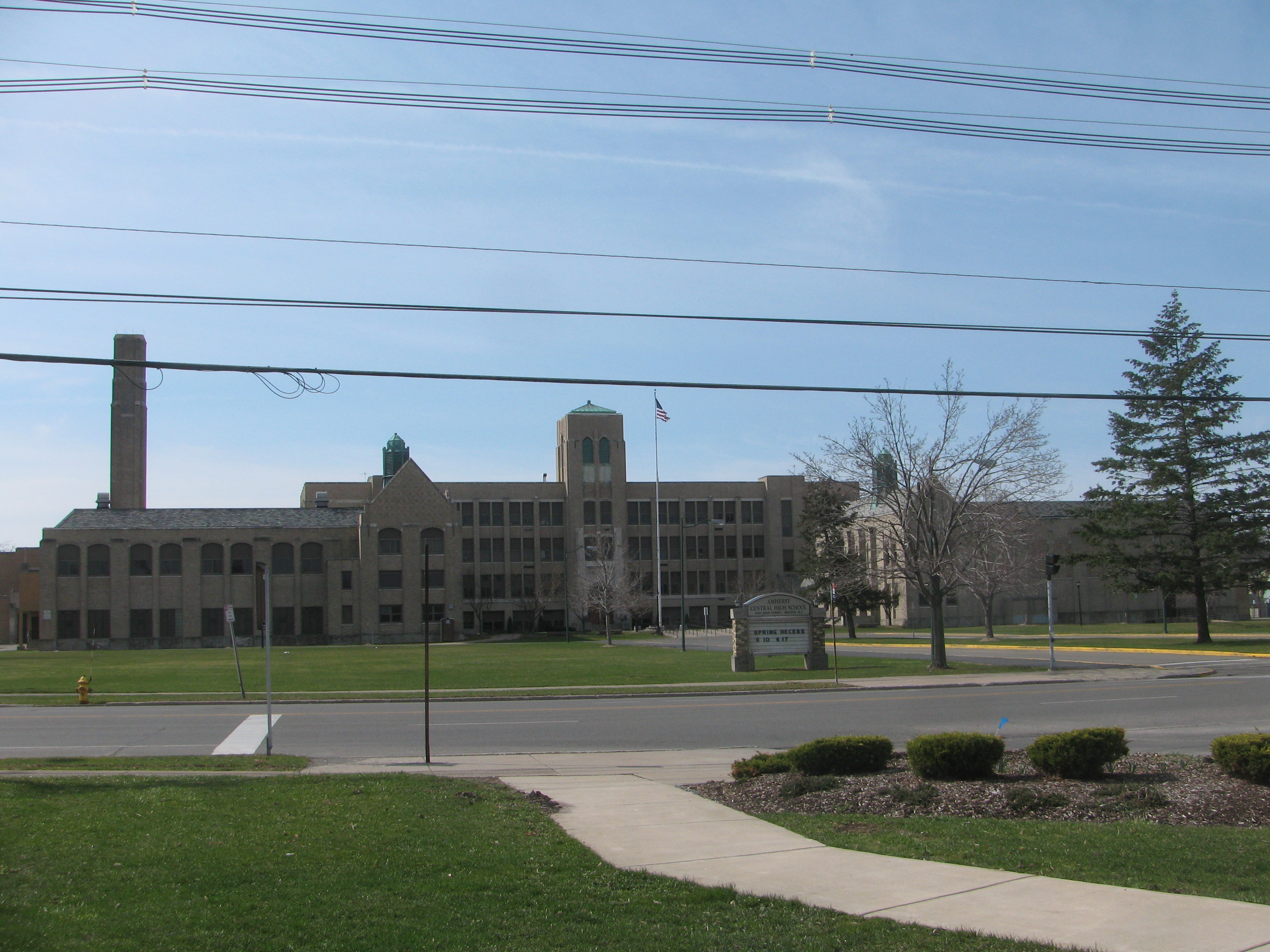
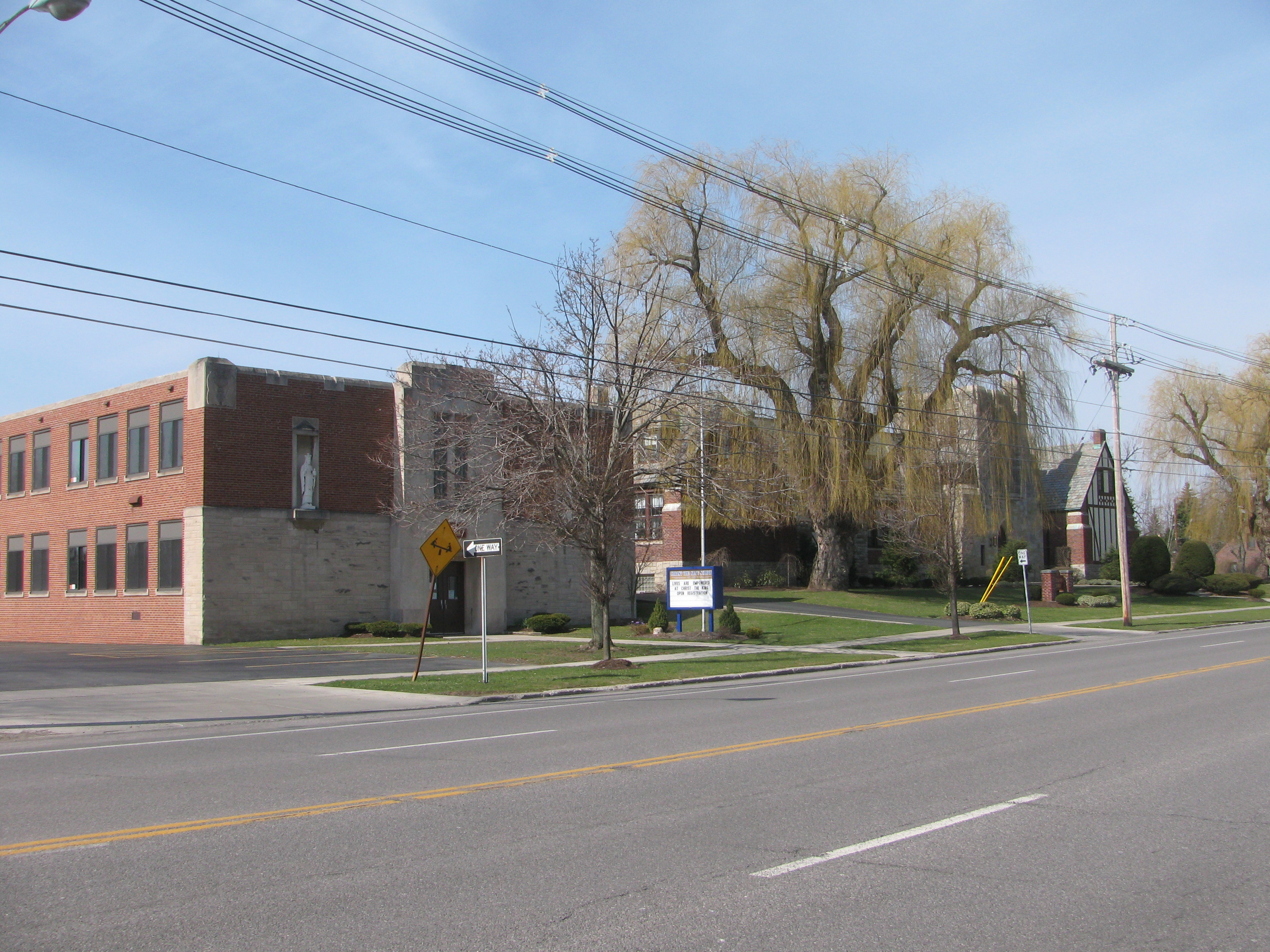
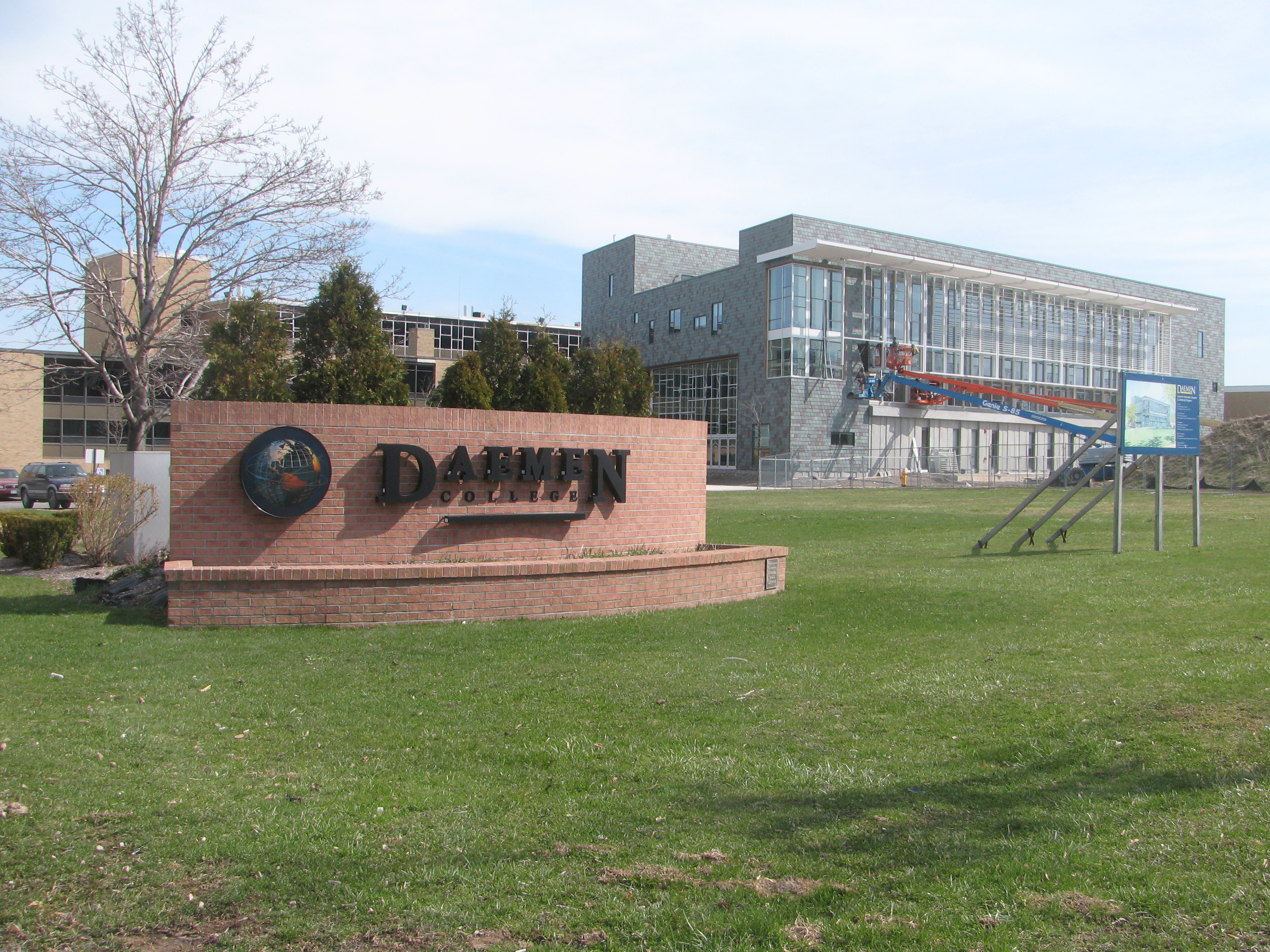
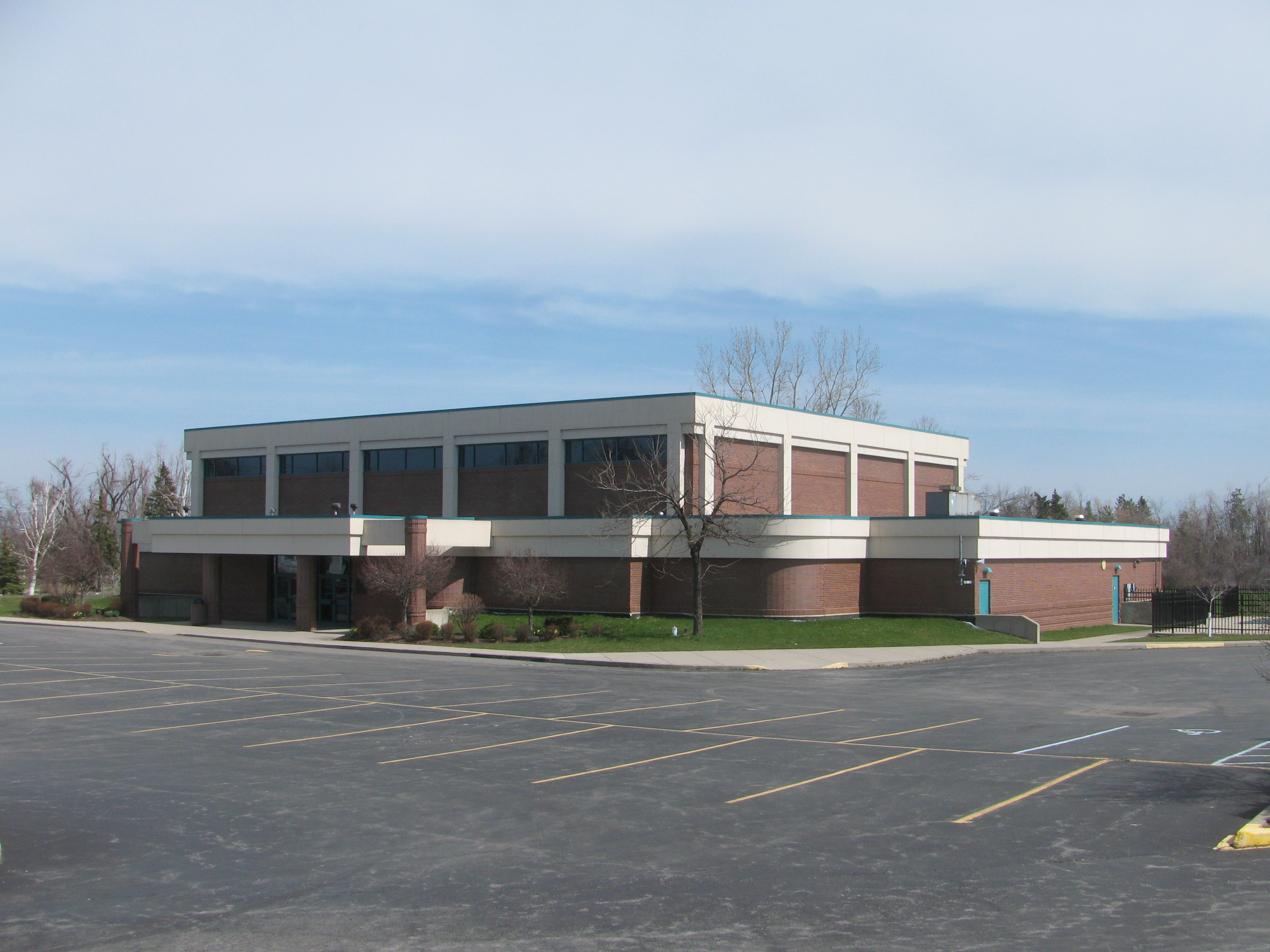
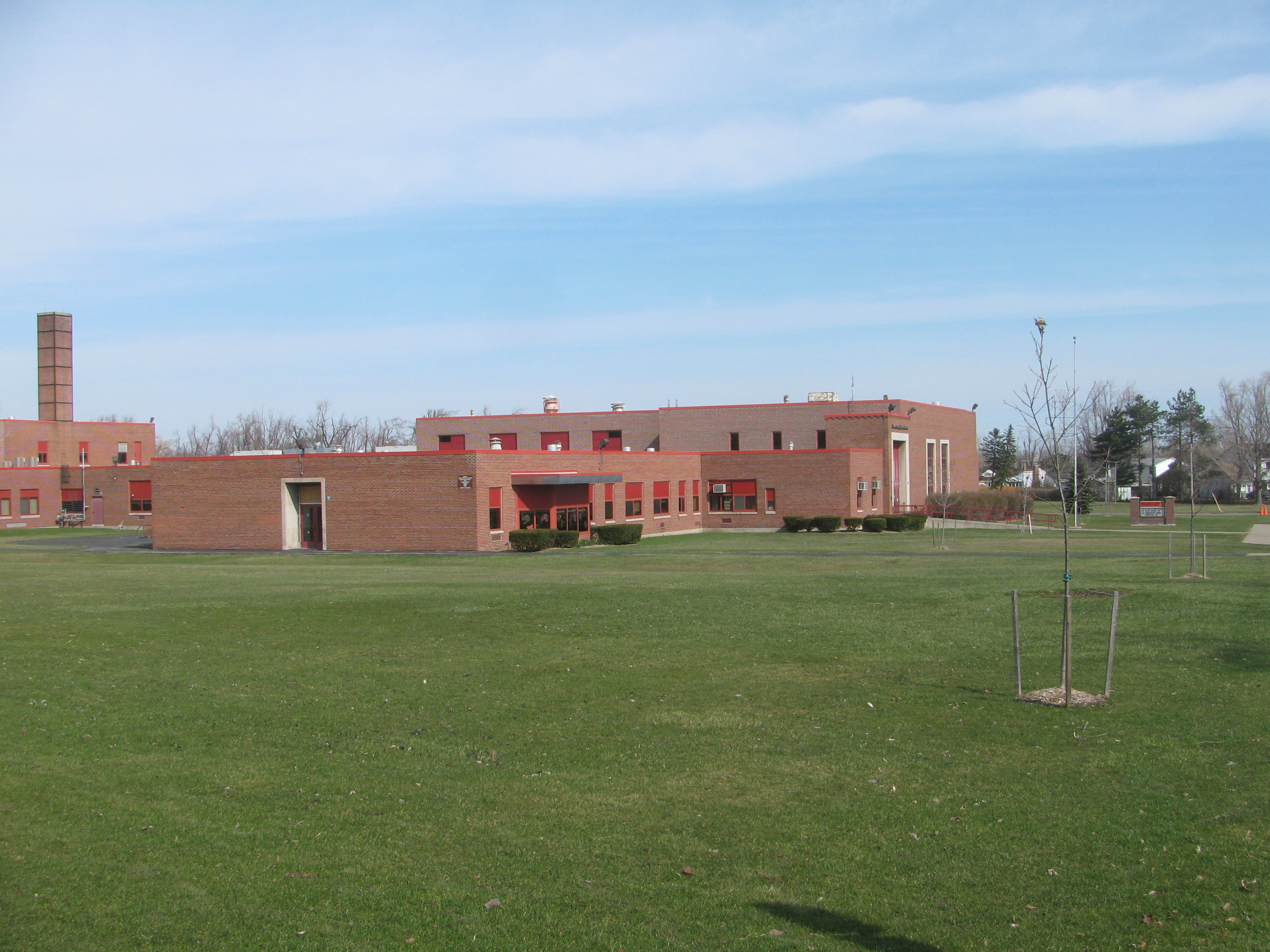
Amherst Central High School, Christ The King School, Daemen College, Park School of Buffalo and Smallwood Drive Elementary

Amherst Central High School, the town's public high school, is located at 4301 Main Street, just west of the business district. The school started when the new Amherst school district was created in the late 1920s. Previously students from Eggertsville and Snyder either attended Bennett High School at 2885 Main Street in Buffalo or what is now called Williamsville South High School at 5950 Main Street in Williamsville and is listed on the National Register of Historic Places as Williamsville Junior and Senior High School.

Daemen College is located across from the high school at 4380 Main Street. Amherst Middle School (formerly Amherst Junior High School), the town's public middle school, is located two blocks south of the High School at 55 Kings Highway. Additionally, the Stenograhic Institute-Western New York at 4525 Main Street, which offers undergraduate degrees, is found in the business district.

Other schools located in the district include Smallwood Drive Elementary School (K-5), Park School of Buffalo (Pre-K-12), and Christ The King School (Pre-K-8). Park has been located in Snyder since 1922. Smallwood is public; Park is private and Christ The King is a Roman Catholic school.
