= Norman McCombs =

Norman McCombs (born c. 1937) is a businessman and 2013 recipient of the National Medal of Technology and Innovation. McCombs developed an oxygen production system that helped ease the pain of millions suffering from lung diseases. President Barack Obama presented the medal to McCombs on February 1, 2013 at the White House.

== Early life and education ==
McCombs was born in 1937 in Amherst, New York. He graduated in 1956 from Amherst Central High School, where he also met his wife, Grace. He then enrolled at Erie Community College where he graduated in 1958 with an associate degree in electrical engineering. After years of research, McCombs enrolled at the State University of New York at Buffalo earning a bachelor's degree in mechanical engineering in 1968.

== Research and Invention ==
McCombs developed a Pressure Swing Adsorption (PSA) system that produced oxygen. The device is primarily used to treat people suffering from chronic obstructive pulmonary disease (COPD).

== Awards ==
2005: Lifetime Achievement Award from the American Intellectual Property Law Association
2006: Distinguished Alumni Award from Erie Community College
2007: University of Buffalo Engineering Alumni Association’s Engineer of the Year Award
2007: Thomas A. Edison Patent Award awarded by the ASME
2013: National Medal of Technology and Innovation awarded by President Obama
