= Amherst Central High School =

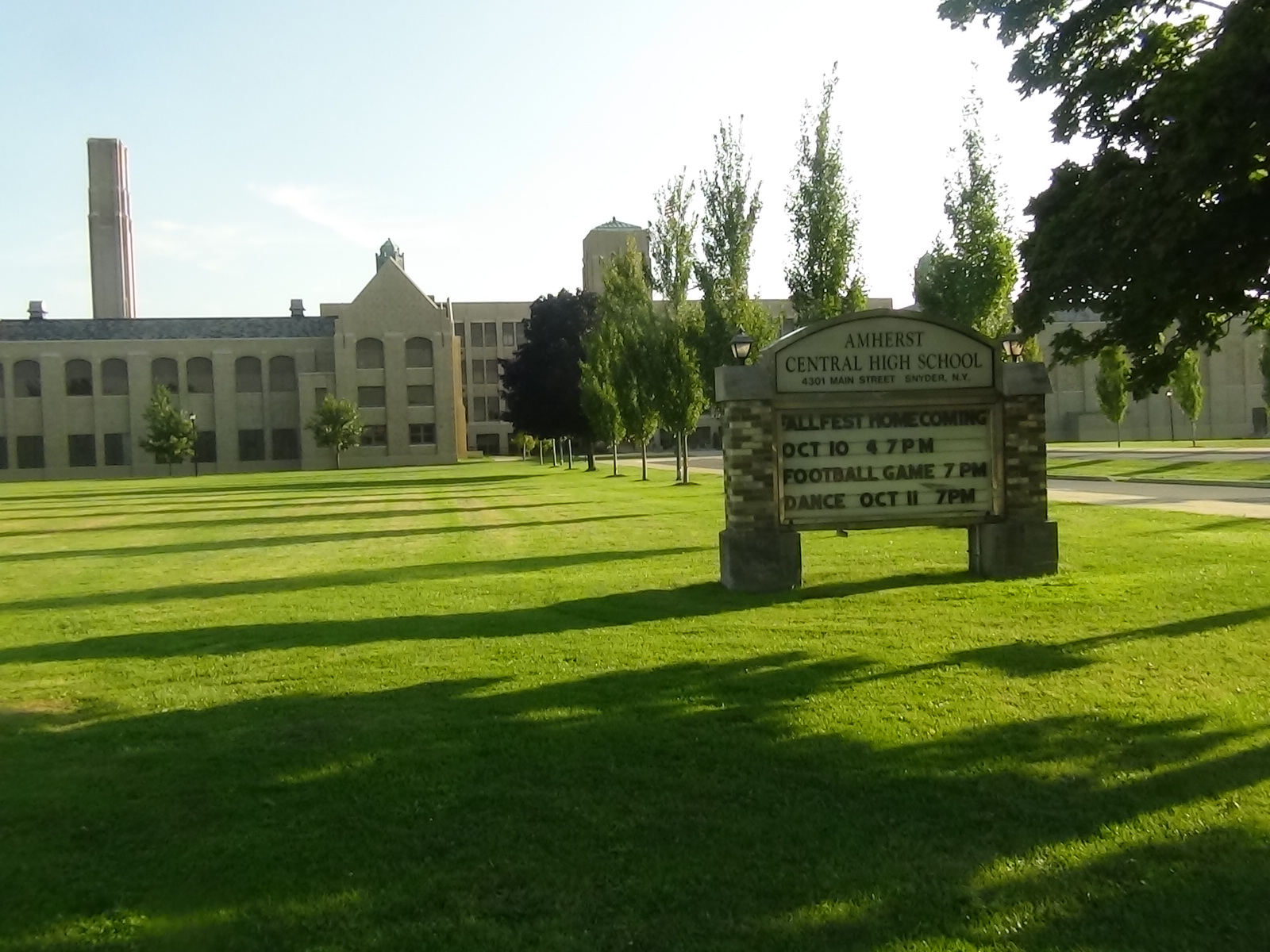

Location
- 4301 Main Street; Amherst, New York 14226; United States; 42°57′44.5″N 78°47′25.5″W

Information
- Type: Public high school
- Established: 1930
- Locale: Suburban
- Principal: Gregory Pigeon
- Teaching staff: 80.86 (FTE)
- Grades: 9-12
- Enrollment: 886 (2023–2024)
- Student to teacher ratio: 10.96
- Colors: Black, orange and white
- Mascot: Tiger
- Yearbook: The Tower
- Website: amherstschools.org

Amherst Central High School (ACHS) is a public high school in Snyder, New York, United States, a hamlet within the town of Amherst, which is within the Buffalo-Niagara Falls metropolitan area. It is the only high school in the Amherst Central School District. Approximately 862 students were enrolled during the 2018–2019 school year. Construction on the current building began in 1929, and the school opened in 1931.

== District ==
The 15-square-mile (38.8 km^{2}) Amherst Central School District had 2,877 students enrolled during the 2018–2019 school year. The high school serves the school district which encompasses the neighborhoods of Eggertsville and Snyder, as well as small portions of the village of Williamsville and the town of Cheektowaga.

In 1998 the high school was judged one of the 100 best in the country by Newsweek magazine, with students taking the highest number of Advanced Placement examinations in Western New York.

The district also has a Parent-Teacher-Student Association (PTSA), which is a joint organization between the Middle School and High School that assists with fundraising, event planning, and community involvement.

== Music and Theater ==
Amherst is known for the high quality of their music program. Instrumental music instruction comprises an Orchestra Department (Mainly String Instruments) and a Band Department (Mainly Wind Instruments). The Band Department consists of Concert Band, Wind Ensemble, and Jazz Ensemble, as well as smaller sectional ensembles. The Orchestra Department consists of Symphony Orchestra, Concert Orchestra, Operetta Pit Orchestra, Sinfonia, and smaller chamber ensembles. The Choral Department (Vocal Music) includes Concert Choir, Concert Chorale, Sweet Sixteens, and Varsity Singers.

Drama Club

The Amherst Drama Club produces two performances each school year. The fall production features notable, often classic plays such as A Christmas Carol, It's a Wonderful Life and The Diary of Anne Frank. The spring production typically consists of short one-act comedies and dramas, written and directed by Senior students.

Operetta

Amherst also has a prominent Operetta program, and has been producing operettas annually since about 1932. For the 2020–2021 school year, the Amherst Operetta Association performed Strawberry Fields. Due to the COVID-19 Pandemic, it was decided that a smaller opera would be performed in lieu of a traditional operetta performance. 'Strawberry Fields' consists of only eight main roles, as well as a small ensemble. The most recent operetta production, during the 2024–2025 school year, was Cats.

== Athletics ==
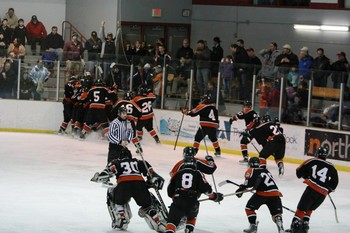
The Amherst High School hockey team

Amherst supports many sports and is a Section B school. The school has a turf athletic stadium, the Dimp Wagner Athletic Field, which serves as the home playing surface for the Amherst Tigers football, men's and women's soccer, men's and women's lacrosse, women's field hockey, and many JV and modified teams. The stadium also plays host to many local high school play-off and championship games in various sporting events.

Amherst had a championship men's hockey team (ranked among the top 25 teams in the nation in 2009) and women's lacrosse teams, producing multiple Division I athletes every year. The men's hockey team won the section six championship on February 28, 2010. This team made league history by winning the championship as the last place seed coming in. It also boasts championship tennis, field hockey, and basketball programs. Their field hockey team has had much success in the past ten years. The team won the Far West Regional Championship game in Medina, NY against Pittsford-Sutherland High School with a score of 2-1 and advanced onto the State Championship for Class B in Vestal, New York on November 20, 2009. Amherst's field hockey program has continued its success with Section 6 Championship wins in 2013, 2014, 2015, and 2017.

== Amherst Central Alumni Foundation ==
Established in 1983, the foundation funds experiences for students emphasizing projects that extend their horizons or involve helping others. The foundation also funds mini-grants for teachers for special projects or equipment not otherwise funded by the school district.

== Notable alumni and former students ==
- Michael Angelakos, musician, lead singer and keyboardist for the band Passion Pit
- Amanda Blake, actress best known for the role of the red-haired saloon proprietress Miss Kitty Russell on the CBS television series Gunsmoke (1955–1975)
- Angela Yvonne Coniglio, pioneer female athlete, member of the Amherst High School, Nazareth University, and Greater Buffalo Sports Halls of Fame
- Jack Davis, industrialist
- Jeffrey Gundlach, investor and philanthropist
- Tom Hambridge, musician, three-time Grammy winner
- Jonah Heim, catcher for the Oakland Athletics and Texas Rangers
- Marc Evan Jackson, actor and comedian best known for his work in the Thrilling Adventure Hour
- Jeremy Jacobs, owner of the Boston Bruins and chairman and chief executive officer of Delaware North Companies; Forbes magazine ranked him #746 of the world's billionaires
- Andy Kulberg, musician, bass and flute for The Blues Project
- Nancy Marchand, actress most famous for her portrayal of Margaret Pynchon in Lou Grant and, in later life, Livia Soprano on The Sopranos
- Norman McCombs, recipient of the National Medal of Technology and Innovation
- Jordan Nwora, professional basketball player for the Milwaukee Bucks of the National Basketball Association
- Julie Pace, Executive Editor, The Associated Press
- Joe Pera, stand-up comedian and star of the Adult Swim show Joe Pera Talks With You
- Dan Licata, stand-up comedian, co-executive producer of the Adult Swim show Joe Pera Talks With You and Saturday Night Live writer
- Mark Rubin, safety for the St. Louis Rams and former safety and wide receiver at Penn State
- Peter Scamurra, professional ice hockey player who was drafted 19th overall in the 1975 NHL Draft by the Washington Capitals
- John Schuck, actor, primarily in stage, movies and television
- James Whitmore, film actor known for his portrayal of the character Brooks in the feature film Shawshank Redemption
