= Julie Pace =

American journalist (born 1982)

- Pace at the 2026 Status Summit
- Born: March 16, 1982 (age 44); Buffalo, New York, U.S.
- Education: Amherst Central High School, Medill School of Journalism, Northwestern University
- Occupation: Journalist
- Years active: 2003–present
- Employer: Associated Press

Julie Marie Pace (born March 16, 1982) is an American journalist from Buffalo, New York. She was named as the executive editor and senior vice president of the Associated Press on September 1, 2021. Pace moved to the position after working as AP's Washington, D.C. bureau chief since 2017. She has worked at the AP since 2007 as a political journalist.

== Early life ==
Pace is the daughter of James J. Pace and Diane M. Pace. Her father is the owner of I.G.S. Landscaping, which is a lawn maintenance company headquartered in Amherst. Pace's mother is a supervisor of radiology at D.I.A./Invision Health of Williamsville, New York State. She is a 2000 graduate of Amherst Central High School and a 2004 graduate of the Medill School of Journalism at Northwestern University.

== Career ==
Pace at the International Journalism Festival in 2024

After graduation she worked for a year as a journalist in South African independent television station e.tv Africa, and then spent two years at The Tampa Tribune before joining the Associated Press (AP) in 2007 as a video producer. She was the AP's first multimedia political journalist. Pace covered the 2008 presidential election and began covering the White House in 2009 when Barack Obama took office. In 2013 she was named chief White House correspondent and in 2017 was promoted to Washington bureau chief. One of her major acts as bureau chief was the expansion of the fact-checking division, as well as publishing explanatory articles on how the A.P. calculates votes and projects the victors of political elections, an integral part of the A.P. since 1848. She is succeeding Sally Buzbee, who in May was named as the first woman executive editor of The Washington Post.

== Personal life ==
In 2014 she married Michael Ferenczy, a viral researcher at the National Institutes of Health.
