= Eggertsville, New York =

Eggertsville
- Census-designated place
- Location in Erie County and the state of New York
- Coordinates: 42°57′47″N 78°48′13″W
- Country: United States
- State: New York
- County: Erie
- Town: Amherst

Area
  - Total: 2.86 sq mi (7.41 km^{2})
  - Land: 2.86 sq mi (7.41 km^{2})
  - Water: 0 sq mi (0.00 km^{2})
- Elevation: 653 ft (199 m)

Population (2020)
  - Total: 15,561
  - Density: 5,439.9/sq mi (2,100.37/km^{2})
- Time zone: UTC-5 (Eastern (EST))
  - Summer (DST): UTC-4 (EDT)
- ZIP code: 14226
- Area code: 716
- FIPS code: 36-23701
- GNIS feature ID: 0949425

Historical population
| Census | Pop. | Note | %± |
|---|---|---|---|
| 2010 | 15,019 | | — |
| 2020 | 15,561 | | 3.6% |
U.S. Decennial Census

Eggertsville is a hamlet and census-designated place (CDP) within the town of Amherst in Erie County, New York, United States. As of the 2020 census, Eggertsville had a population of 15,561.

Eggertsville is part of the Buffalo-Niagara Falls metropolitan area.

== Geography ==
Eggertsville is located at 42°57′47″N 78°48′13″W (42.96314, -78.80364), in the southwestern corner of the town of Amherst, directly adjacent to the northeast corner of the city of Buffalo. As delineated by the U.S. Census Bureau, the northern boundary of the CDP is New York State Route 324, and the eastern boundary is formed by Getzville Road and Brantwood Road. The southern and western borders of the CDP follow the town boundary of Amherst.

New York State Route 5, Main Street, passes through the CDP, leading southwest to the center of Buffalo and east towards Williamsville in the town of Amherst.

According to the United States Census Bureau, the CDP has a total area of 2.9 square miles (7.4 km^{2}), all land.

== Demographics ==
=== 2020 census ===
As of the 2020 census, Eggertsville had a population of 15,561. The median age was 37.5 years. 21.3% of residents were under the age of 18 and 16.8% of residents were 65 years of age or older. For every 100 females there were 95.0 males, and for every 100 females age 18 and over there were 92.1 males age 18 and over.

100.0% of residents lived in urban areas, while 0.0% lived in rural areas.

There were 6,430 households in Eggertsville, of which 29.4% had children under the age of 18 living in them. Of all households, 43.9% were married-couple households, 19.9% were households with a male householder and no spouse or partner present, and 30.8% were households with a female householder and no spouse or partner present. About 29.4% of all households were made up of individuals and 11.8% had someone living alone who was 65 years of age or older.

There were 6,774 housing units, of which 5.1% were vacant. The homeowner vacancy rate was 0.8% and the rental vacancy rate was 6.2%.

Racial composition as of the 2020 census
| Race | Number | Percent |
|---|---|---|
| White | 10,482 | 67.4% |
| Black or African American | 2,121 | 13.6% |
| American Indian and Alaska Native | 40 | 0.3% |
| Asian | 1,772 | 11.4% |
| Native Hawaiian and Other Pacific Islander | 5 | 0.0% |
| Some other race | 214 | 1.4% |
| Two or more races | 927 | 6.0% |
| Hispanic or Latino (of any race) | 673 | 4.3% |

== Education ==
The CDP is mostly within the Amherst Central School District, with a small portion in the Sweet Home Central School District. The Amherst district operates Amherst High School.
