= List of Designated Historic Properties in Amherst, New York =

The Historic Preservation Commission of the Town of Amherst, New York is a governmental organization empowered to designate historic landmarks and districts within the town's boundaries. As of August 2021, there are 32 such landmarks in the town, all of which are individual properties as opposed to districts.

== Historic Preservation Commission ==
The Historic Preservation Commission was established in 1994 under the auspices of Amherst's Historic Preservation Law, in accordance with Section 96-a of the General Municipal Law of the State of New York concerning protection of historic places, buildings and works of art. This provision of law gives the town government the authority to "provide, by local law, regulations, special conditions and restrictions for the protection, enhancement, perpetuation and the use of places, districts, sites, buildings, structures, works of art and other objects having special character or special historical or other aesthetic interest or value".

== Designation of historic properties ==
The Commission's power to recommend designation of historic landmarks or districts is based on a range of different criteria including importance in local history, architectural distinction, and whether, "because of a unique location or singular physical characteristic, [they represent]... established and familiar visual feature[s] of the neighborhood." The recommendation is then sent forward to the Town Board, who, after receiving feedback from various town departments and from citizens themselves at a public hearing, either reject the recommendation or adopt it into law as deemed appropriate. Upon designation as a historic property or district, the assent of the Historic Preservation Commission is required for any future "exterior alteration, restoration, reconstruction, excavation, grading, demolition, new construction [or] material change... which affect [its] appearance or cohesiveness."

== Village of Williamsville ==
To date, the Amherst Town Board has only applied historic designation to properties within the unincorporated portion of the town. The incorporated Village of Williamsville has its own Historic Preservation Commission, an organ of the village government wholly separate from its town-based counterpart, that handles landmark designation within its boundaries.

== List of Designated Historic Properties ==
Property name	Address or location	Image	NRHP Status	Description
1-7 Center Street			Eligibility undetermined	Former cooperage and stave factory operated from 1852 until c. 1880 by brothers Jacob and Franklin Goetz, sons of Joseph Goetz, founder and namesake of the hamlet of Getzville.
23 Four Seasons West			Eligible	Former home of oil magnate Franklin B. Hower, once situated on a 17-acre country estate. An unusual Neoclassical design built c. 1905 by an unknown architect.
38 Richfield Road			Eligibility undetermined	Side-gabled vernacular stone residence with 1920s-era front porch in Craftsman style. Possibly one of the oldest buildings in Amherst (estimates for its date of construction extend back to the 1810s); once part of the 100-acre cattle farm of pioneer settler Peter Hershey, where it may have served as a barn.
58 Youngs Road			Not eligible	Two-and-a-half-story clapboard residence built c. 1905 for smallholder and sometime hotelier Michael Albert; a typical example of vernacular farmhouse construction of the era.
260 Campbell Boulevard			Not eligible	Two-story vernacular Italianate building erected c. 1860 by pioneer settler Charles Dean which, at varying times, has served a range of civic functions in the hamlet of Getzville: tavern, post office, court house, dance hall, and roadside inn for travelers along the Canandaigua and Niagara Falls Railroad.
4030 Rensch Road			Eligible	Built c. 1855 by German-born farmer Gottfried Kuhl; one of a very few surviving stone houses dating back to the pioneer era of the town's early history. Vernacular farmhouse design with Greek Revival pedimented portico in front.
Buffalo Academy of the Sacred Heart Main Building	3860 Main Street		Eligible	1930 Colonial Revival Roman Catholic girls' school building designed by Bley & Lyman. Sacred Heart was founded by the Sisters of St. Francis in 1877 and originally located in downtown Buffalo.
Coplon Mansion at Daemen University	4380 Main Street		Eligible	Built in 1919 from an Italian Renaissance-style design by Buffalo architect Louis Greenstein; served as the country home of furniture merchant Samuel Coplon. Purchased by Daemen University in 1956 who used it first as student housing and then for classrooms and offices.
Country Club of Buffalo Stone House	251 Youngs Road		Eligible	Built c. 1840s of locally quarried Onondaga limestone for James S. Youngs; one of a very few surviving pioneer-era stone houses in Amherst and a typical example of Greek Revival-influenced vernacular farmhouse architecture of the era. Now owned by the Country Club of Buffalo.
Entranceways at Kensington Avenue at Roycroft Boulevard			Eligibility undetermined	Decorative stone walls and lamp posts marking the entrance to an early suburban subdivision.
Entranceway at Main Street at Darwin Drive			Listed	Decorative ashlar lamp posts and wrought-iron sidewalk gates built in 1927 to mark the entrance to an early suburban subdivision.
Entranceway at Main Street at Getzville Road			Eligibility undetermined	Decorative stone walls marking the entrance to an early suburban subdivision, a portion of which was built c. 1820 and is the oldest such stone wall remaining along Main Street.
Entranceway at Main Street at High Park Boulevard			Listed	Decorative ashlar lamp posts and walls built in 1916 to mark the entrance to an early suburban subdivision.
Entranceway at Main Street at Lafayette Boulevard			Listed	Decorative stone walls, posts, and roofed arched gateways built c. 1920 to mark the entrance to an early suburban subdivision.
Entranceways at Main Street at Lamarck Drive and Smallwood Drive			Listed	Decorative stone walls, posts, and prominent Tudor Revival-style metal-roofed gatehouses built in 1926 to mark the entrance to an early suburban subdivision.
Entranceway at Main Street at LeBrun Road			Listed	Decorative ashlar lamp posts and walls built in 1916 to mark the entrance to an early suburban subdivision.
Entranceway at Main Street at Roycroft Boulevard			Listed	Decorative brick lampposts and semicircular half-height stone walls built in 1918 to mark the entrance to an early suburban subdivision.
Entranceway at Main Street at Westfield Road and Ivyhurst Road			Listed	Decorative ashlar posts and walls built in 1920 by merchant-turned-real estate developer John Sattler to mark the entrance to an early suburban subdivision.
Gethsemane Cemetery Stone Chapel	203 Reist Street		Eligibility undetermined	Gothic-style cemetery chapel built in 1902 on the former property of the Franciscan sisters' St. Mary of the Angels Motherhouse.
Goodyear Water Tower	east side of Old Tower Lane between Raine Drive and Northill Drive		Eligible	The only known octagonal water tower in Erie County, built c. 1920 to supply water to the Josephine Goodyear Convalescent Home for Children.
Haussauer House	1000 North Forest Road		Not eligible	One-and-a-half-story Craftsman bungalow built c. 1910 as home of farmer-turned-National Guardsman Henry G. Haussauer.
Hedstrom Gate House	4196 Main Street		Eligible	Unique large house on what was once the 97-acre country estate of coal merchant Arthur Hedstrom, built in 1904 as a combination of two earlier buildings dating to c. 1820 and c. 1850. Site of last operational toll gate along the Buffalo and Williamsville Macadam Road, decommissioned 1899.
Maple & North Forest Schoolhouse	1323 North Forest Road		Not eligible	The only former one-room brick schoolhouse in Amherst that remains in its original location, built c. 1860 for District #17.
Mennonite Meeting House	5178 Main Street		Listed	Vernacular Greek Revival-style building erected in 1834 of locally quarried limestone as house of worship for an Anabaptist community that included many of the town's founding families. In use as a church until 1981; now houses a branch location of Evans Bank.
Park School Stone House	4635 Harlem Road		Eligible	Oldest building in the hamlet of Snyder, built c. 1831 as home of pioneer settler John Schenck. Reputed to have been a station on the Underground Railroad under a subsequent owner. Now owned by the Park School of Buffalo.
Rosary Hall at Daemen University	4380 Main Street		Eligible	Designed in 1910 by prominent Buffalo architect George Cary; home first to insurance executive George Crouch and then to Irvin Airchute Company cofounder George Waite; now owned by Daemen University. Italian Renaissance style with prominent Mediterranean Revival influences.
St. Mary of the Angels Motherhouse	400 Mill Street		Listed	Collegiate Gothic convent designed in 1928 for the Sisters of Saint Francis by Dietel & Wade; now a senior housing facility and part of Amherst State Park.
Stimm House	895 North Forest Road		Eligible	Former home of civil engineer Henry Stimm, designed in 1942 by architect Sebastian Tauriello; International Style with heavy influence from Frank Lloyd Wright's contemporaneous work (more specifically, its design is said to be loosely based on Fallingwater).
Street sign at Main Street at Audubon Drive			Eligibility undetermined	Decorative wrought iron street sign built c. 1920s to mark the entrance to an early suburban subdivision.
Street sign at Main Street at Burbank Drive			Eligibility undetermined	Decorative wrought iron street sign built c. 1920s to mark the entrance to an early suburban subdivision.
Street sign at Main Street at Burroughs Drive and Darwin Drive			Eligibility undetermined	Decorative wrought iron street sign built c. 1920s to mark the entrance to an early suburban subdivision.
Williamsville South High School	5950 Main Street		Listed	1950 Colonial Revival public high school building designed by Duane Lyman.

== See also ==
- National Register of Historic Places in Erie County, New York
- List of local landmarks in Williamsville, New York
