= List of local landmarks in Williamsville, New York =

The Historic Preservation Commission of the Village of Williamsville, New York is a governmental organization empowered to designate historic landmarks and districts within the village's boundaries. As of September 2021, there are 34 such landmarks in the village, all of which are individual properties as opposed to districts.

== Historic Preservation Commission ==
Williamsville's Historic Preservation Commission was created under the auspices of Local Law No. 4 of 1983 with the power to identify, publicize, and promote the preservation of "places, sites, structures and buildings of historic or architectural significance, antiquity, uniqueness of exterior design or construction... to maintain the architectural character of the Village, to contribute to the aesthetic value of the Village and to promote the general good, welfare, health and safety of the Village and its residents".

== Landmark designation ==
The criteria used by the Commission to recommend historic designation differ slightly based on whether the proposed landmark is an individual property or a historic district. In the case of individual properties, nominees must either possess "historic or aesthetic interest... as part of the political, economic, or social history" of the village, state, or nation, embody "the distinguishing characteristics of a type, period or method of construction or design style, or [be] a valuable example of the use of indigenous materials or craftsmanship; or [be] representative of the work of a designer, architect or builder", represent "an established and familiar visual feature of the community by virtue of its unique location or singular physical characteristic", or "ha[ve] yielded or... be likely to yield information important in prehistory or history". In addition to all of the foregoing, the properties in a proposed historic district must also generally coalesce coherently so as to be considered "a unique section of the Village by reason of possessing those qualities that would satisfy such criteria."

Somewhat unusually, building interiors are also specifically called out by village law as a separate category of historic landmark. The criteria for designation of interior landmarks is similar to the above, with the additional stipulation that the space must be "customarily open or accessible to the public".

Upon being designated as a landmark (or a contributing property to a landmark district), the issuance by the Commission of a Certificate of Appropriateness is required for any future "exterior alteration, restoration, rehabilitation, or construction activity". Ordinarily, this entails the requirement that "features which contribute to the character of the individual landmark or historic district... be retained", and that any "new construction... be compatible with the property on which it is located" (as well as with other contributing properties in the historic district if it's part of one) in terms of architectural design, construction materials, scale, and general appearance.

== List of Local Landmarks ==
| Property name | Address or location | Date of designation | Image | NRHP Status | Description |
|---|---|---|---|---|---|
| Williamsville Water Mill | 56 East Spring Street | 25 Jul 1984 | | Listed | Timber-framed mill complex built in 1811 on Ellicott Creek by Jonas Williams, where water power from the adjacent Glen Falls was used at various times to produce flour, cement, and cider, was the impetus for the village's original settlement. Now one of the oldest extant buildings in Erie County. |
| Cambria Castle | 175 Oakgrove Drive | 26 Aug 1985 | | Eligibility undetermined | Imposing stone house built from 1917 to 1942 on an island in Ellicott Creek by German-born stonemason Ignatz Oechsner, designed in a Medieval-inspired style to mimic a riverside castle near his hometown. |
| Village Meeting House & Museum | 5658 Main Street | 25 Feb 1986 | | Listed | Italianate-style brick church built in 1871 for the local Disciples of Christ congregation; sold to the village government in 1976 for use as a historical museum and events venue. |
| Hopkins Block aka Ronecker Building | 5550 Main Street | 9 Feb 1987 | | Eligibility undetermined | Three-story Italianate-style commercial block built in 1854, the tallest in Williamsville at the time. Housed various retail and business establishments over the years including the law practice of village founding father Timothy Hopkins, the Williamsville Classical Institute, and men's clothier Fred Ronecker. |
| Williamsville Classical Institute | 39 Academy Street | 24 Aug 1987 | | Eligible | Tudor Revival-style school building erected in 1923 as home of Williamsville Junior and Senior High School (the successor to the short-lived Classical Institute, which, notwithstanding the landmark's official name, had closed in 1869). Now houses a private Christian grade school. |
| Glen Park | 237 Glen Avenue | 12 Jun 1989 | | Eligibility undetermined | Once the site of a limestone quarry, later a popular amusement park and concert hall, now a verdant park containing Glen Falls and situated next to the Williamsville Water Mill complex at the historic heart of the village. |
| Williamsville Railroad Station | 86 South Long Street | 14 May 1990 | | Eligible | Arts and Crafts-style station building that served passengers on the Lehigh Valley Railroad from 1896 through the 1940s, now owned and maintained by the Western New York Railway Historical Society. |
| Hopkins Schoolhouse | 72 South Cayuga Road | 24 Sep 1990 | | Eligible | Greek Revival-style one-room stone schoolhouse built c. 1840 on land donated by prominent village resident Timothy Hopkins, who also served as its first schoolmaster. Operated as a school until 1924 and thereafter at various times as a senior center, museum, and clubhouse. |
| SS. Peter & Paul Church | 5480 Main Street | 25 Nov 1991 | | Eligibility undetermined | Stone church building erected in 1863 for the local Roman Catholic diocese; a good example of vernacular Gothic Revival architecture of the era. Founding pastor John Nepomucene Neumann was later canonized as first male American Catholic saint. |
| Williamsville Cemetery | 5402 Main Street | 23 Mar 1992 | | Eligibility undetermined | Probably the oldest extant cemetery in Erie County, established in 1810 as the Long family plot and in 1824 opened for burial to all village residents. Contains the remains of many prominent figures in the early history of Williamsville. |
| Red Mill House | 60 East Spring Street | 2 Dec 2005 | | Listed | Two-story frame building erected c. 1840 as home for the operator of the adjacent Williamsville Water Mill; later used as offices. A fine example of the vernacular late-period Greek Revival style popular in rural America during the era of its construction. |
| St. Paul's Evangelical Lutheran Church | 68 Eagle Street | 10 Nov 2014 | | Eligibility undetermined | Wood-frame church built in 1834 for the local Disciples of Christ congregation and used by them until their move into what's now the Village Meeting House; has been the home of its present congregation since c. 1870. An excellent example of vernacular early Gothic Revival church architecture. |
| Moor Pat Craft Beer Bar | 78 East Spring Street | 10 Nov 2014 | | Eligibility undetermined | Typical early to mid-19th century vernacular wood frame structure, originally located across Main Street on the farmstead of pioneer settler John Hutchinson where it served as a barn; moved to its present site in 1909. Has served over the years as a veterinary hospital, cobbler's shop, and ice cream parlor; now home to the Moor Pat gastropub. |
| Joseph Seitz Shoe Store | 5428 Main Street | 10 Nov 2014 | | Eligibility undetermined | Two-and-a-half-story retail building erected c. 1875, a fine example of commercial Italianate architecture and also features one of the only examples of Eastlake detailing in the Town of Amherst. Originally a shoe and boot store belonging to Alsatian-born cobbler Joseph Seitz. |
| Joseph Seitz House | 5430 Main Street | 10 Nov 2014 | | Eligibility undetermined | Two-story side-gabled brick Greek Revival residence built c. 1850 as home of Alsatian-born cobbler Joseph Seitz; a good example of the style as practiced in the latter period of its popularity. |
| The Jacqueline Shoppe | 5522 Main Street | 10 Nov 2014 | | Eligibility undetermined | Built c. 1860; an example of Second Empire-style architecture that's quite rare in the suburban areas of Erie County. Originally a general store operated by father and son Emanuel and Henry Herr; later housed the village post office and a variety of other retail concerns. |
| Marine Trust Company Williamsville Branch | 5554 Main Street | 10 Nov 2014 | | Eligibility undetermined | Two-story bank building erected in the 1930s as a branch location of the Marine Trust Company of Buffalo and occupied by it and its successor companies until 2016. A good example of the simplified Colonial Revival style of the era. |
| Eagle House Restaurant | 5578 Main Street | 10 Nov 2014 | | Eligibility undetermined | Oldest continuously operating business in Williamsville, founded in 1832 by pioneer settler Oziel Smith as a tavern serving travelers along the Great Iroquois Trail. Reputed to have been a station on the Underground Railroad under a subsequent owner. |
| H. S. Smith Grocery and Drugstore | 5590 Main Street | 10 Nov 2014 | | Eligibility undetermined | One of two neighboring commercial structures built c. 1893 by Alexander Gotwalt and Henry Metz for speculative purposes on the erstwhile site of the Benjamin Miller estate, both fine examples of the vernacular commercial architecture of their era. Originally home to H. S. Smith's grocery and drugstore; has housed a variety of different retail concerns since then. |
| Steinbrenner & Abel Meat Market | 5596 Main Street | 10 Nov 2014 | | Eligibility undetermined | One of two neighboring commercial structures built c. 1893 by Alexander Gotwalt and Henry Metz for speculative purposes on the erstwhile site of the Benjamin Miller estate, both fine examples of the vernacular commercial architecture of their era. Originally home to Steinbrenner & Abel meat market; has housed a variety of different retail concerns since then, most recently a branch location of Ten Thousand Villages. |
| Christian Rutt House | 5672 Main Street | 10 Nov 2014 | | Eligibility undetermined | Two-story wood-frame house built c. 1840 for wealthy miller-turned-Town Highway Commissioner Christian Rutt; a fine example of late-period Federal-style residential architecture. Now houses the offices of the law firm of Robshaw & Voelkl. |
| Former Campbell Chevrolet | 5688 Main Street | 10 Nov 2014 | | Eligibility undetermined | Built in 1946; a good example of Arts and Crafts-style commercial architecture adapted for use as an automobile dealership, one of many along Main Street in the mid-20th century. Later used as a training school for Ford Motor service technicians. Has housed a succession of secondhand furniture stores since 1979. |
| Hershey-Measer House | 5792 Main Street | 10 Nov 2014 | | Not eligible | Two-story brick residence built c. 1840 for Christian Hershey, pioneer farmer and patriarch of one of the most prominent families in Williamsville's early history; later longtime home to "Grandma" Mary Measer, widowed matriarch of another locally prominent family. Exemplary of late-period Greek Revival architecture, with an unusually intact exterior despite its conversion to offices in the 1970s. |
| Harrington-Lapp-Evans House | 5893 Main Street | 10 Nov 2014 | | Not eligible | Two-and-a-half-story 1918 Colonial Revival residence that served as home to, and the offices of, three of Williamsville's most prominent physicians representing different generations of the same family: first general practitioner Dr. Richard Harrington; then his son-in-law, dentist Dr. Lester Lapp; then Lapp's son-in-law, Dr. Robert Evans, also a dentist. |
| Calvary Episcopal Church | 20 Milton Street | 10 Nov 2014 | | Eligible | Stone church building erected in 1952 by Buffalo-based architect Robert North. An outstanding example of midcentury church design utilizing a hybrid of the Tudor and Late Gothic Revival styles. Calvary Episcopal itself is one of Williamsville's oldest extant religious congregations, founded c. 1819 according to some sources. |
| Main Street Bridge at Ellicott Creek | | 10 Nov 2014 | | Eligibility undetermined | Built in 1882 by engineer Martin Wendel of locally quarried Onondaga limestone; one of only a few historic stone bridges that remain along Route 5 in Western New York. |
| James Rumbold Blacksmith and Carriage Shop | 5329 Main Street | 10 Nov 2014 | | Eligibility undetermined | Two-story brick building constructed c. 1840 has served a number of functions over the years, but is most notable historically as the blacksmith, carriage and wagon shop operated by James Gottlieb Rumbold in the middle 19th century. An excellent example of the Greek Revival style of architecture. |
| Philip J. Snyder House | 5409 Main Street | 10 Nov 2014 | | Eligibility undetermined | Two-and-a-half-story brick Italianate residence with Eastlake detailing on the porch built in 1877 for local grocer Phillip J. Snyder. |
| Williamsville Liquor Store | 5511 Main Street | 10 Nov 2014 | | Eligibility undetermined | Two-and-a-half-story mixed-use structure with apartments on upper floors and retail space below, built c. late 1920s and home to the Williamsville Liquor Store since c. 1960. A relatively intact example of the Craftsman style adapted to commercial purposes. Vintage neon sign above storefront dates to 1950s. |
| Bank of America | 5529 Main Street | 10 Nov 2014 | | Eligibility undetermined | Built 1935, sports an interesting late-period Renaissance Revival design whose streamlined forms anticipate the arrival of Modernism. Built to house the village post office, but has served as a bank for most of its existence: first as a branch of Liberty National Bank, then under corporate successors Norstar, Fleet, and Bank of America. |
| Esther Carpenter Hershey House | 5707 Main Street | 10 Nov 2014 | | Eligibility undetermined | Two-story Greek Revival residence built c. 1852 for Esther Carpenter Hershey, widow of prosperous mill owner Benjamin Hershey. Later converted to offices. |
| Gotwalt-Pratt House | 5725 Main Street | 10 Nov 2014 | | Eligibility undetermined | Spacious wood-frame residence built in 1854 as residence of local crockery merchant Alexander Gotwalt; substantial alterations by later owner Dr. Robert S. Pratt in 1941 doubled size of building and added Colonial Revival design elements that contrast interestingly with original Greek Revival aesthetic. Converted for commercial use in 1978. |
| John Haskill House | 5757 Main Street | 10 Nov 2014 | | Eligibility undetermined | Brick Italianate cottage built in 1851 as residence of British-born wagonmaker John Haskill, repurposed for commercial usage in 1956. |
| Beach-Tuyn Funeral Home | 5541 Main Street | 10 Nov 2014 | | Eligibility undetermined | 1888 hip-roofed Italianate Villa-style structure with prominent belvedere cupola houses one of Williamsville's oldest extant businesses, founded c. 1850 by Demeter Wehrle and still owned and operated by his descendants. |

== See also ==
- National Register of Historic Places in Erie County, New York
