= Glen Falls =

Glen Falls may refer to:

- Glen Falls (New York), a small waterfall in Williamsville, New York
- Glen Falls (North Carolina), a large waterfall in the Nantahala National Forest near Highlands, North Carolina
- Glens Falls, New York, a city in the U.S. state of New York
