= Pentecostal Collegiate Institute =

The Pentecostal Collegiate Institute refers to two antecedents of the Eastern Nazarene College in Massachusetts:

- Pentecostal Collegiate Institute (New York)
- Pentecostal Collegiate Institute (Rhode Island)
