= Wilmer & the Dukes =

American R&B band

Wilmer and the Dukes
- Also known as: Wilmer Alexander Junior and the Dukes
- Origin: Geneva, New York, United States
- Genres: R&B
- Years active: 1960s

Wilmer and the Dukes (originally Wilmer Alexander Junior and the Dukes) were a United States R&B band in upstate New York in the 1960s. Though they produced only a handful of singles and one album, they performed regularly, and had a dedicated following. One reviewer said, "In Geneva, there were two kinds of kids. Those who went to 'Wilmer' and those who didn't." They are remembered by a number of the college alumni from that area, and their music continues to be played today. They were also an influence on other rising musicians such as Eric Bloom, the lead singer of Blue Öyster Cult, and they may have been the inspiration for "Otis Day and the Knights", the 1960s fictional band in the 1978 movie Animal House.

The group disbanded in 1974, but came back together for some benefit concerts in 1988. With several personnel changes, the band stayed together and played for the next 24 years as The Legendary Dukes until breaking up in early 2012.

== History ==
The band originated in 1957 in Geneva, New York, formed by Wilmer Alexander Jr. (born c. 1943), Ronnie Alberts, and Ralph Gillotte. Except for Alexander, all of the members were white, which made the band stand out even more in some of the all-black clubs that they first played in. The Alexanders lived on 90 Wadsworth Street in Geneva, and the band used to practice at one of the garages owned by the Felice Trucking Company on Kirkwood Ave.

Alexander sang and played saxophone, and the band was managed by Ebo (Owl) Alberts, the father of the drummer, Ronnie Alberts, and the original bassist, Monty Alberts. The guitarist, Doug Brown, was from the South and played Stevie Cropper-style. Doug Brown wrote their big hit "Give Me One More Chance". Ralph "Duke" Gillotte was the keyboardist and additional vocalist.

They were primarily a cover band, playing other people's material, such as by Steve Miller and The Rolling Stones. Other music was from Sam and Dave and there were also saxophone based hits such as those originated by Junior Walker & the AllStars. One of their most popular covers was Lee Dorsey's "Get Out of My Life, Woman".

=== Early years ===

The band played from approximately from 1961 to 1974 at various locations around Upstate New York, mostly on the college and bar circuit. Regular venues were The "Pittsford Inn" in Pittsford, New York, "Club 86" in Geneva on Saturdays, and "Bristol Ski Lodge" in Canandaigua on Fridays. Summer 1962 found them at The Dolphin, Sodus Point and the Boom-Boom Club, 9 Mile Point, Webster. They were also regular guests at St. Bonaventure University, and known to play at the Gargoyle Park Pavilion in Olean. In 1964 and 1965, they appeared regularly at parties sponsored by the Social Lions, a secret society at Niagara University in Lewiston.

One club which helped them was The Inferno in Williamsville, as well as Gilligans in Cheektowaga, N.Y. both suburbs of Buffalo. Every Wednesday night, long lines of fans formed through Glen Park and over the bridge on Glen Avenue, some waiting for hours to get into the sold-out Inferno. Wilmer & the Dukes would play such cover songs as "Reach Out" and "I Can't Help Myself (Sugar Pie Honey Bunch)" by the Four Tops, "Shotgun" & "Road Runner" by Junior Walker & the Allstars, and "Baby Let Me Bang Your Box" by Doug Clark and the Hot Nuts. Other acts they opened for included Wilson Pickett and Sly & the Family Stone. Another of their venues was a bowling alley, Clover Lanes in Rochester. The lanes would be covered over with a temporary wooden stage, Wilmer and the Dukes would play an opening set, and then a national act such as Tommy James and the Shondells, Freddie and the Dreamers, or The Association would be the headliner. Wilmer and the Dukes also regularly played at The Red Dog in Manlius, a Syracuse suburb. They also performed a number of Sunday afternoons at the DeMay Hotel ballroom located on the corner of Latta Road and North Greece Road in Greece, NY.

It was at the "Holiday Bar and Grille" in 1963 that they were first heard by future Blue Öyster Cult vocalist Eric Bloom. He became a fan of the band, attending over 100 performances, and stayed close with them for years. In 1967, his own student band, Lost and Found, opened for the Dukes when they played at his campus, Hobart College, and they also came to perform at his fraternity, Tau Kappa Epsilon.

=== Recording history ===
After seven years of playing the local circuit, arrangements were made for the group to cut their first recordings for Buffalo-based Aphrodisiac Records. The band's first single was an original dance track by guitarist Brown called "Give Me One More Chance", and was released in the spring of 1968. It got heavy play on stations in upper New York state and upper Pennsylvania, and was a top 40 hit in several East Coast markets and also in Phoenix, Arizona and Bakersfield, California. However, nationally the record only peaked at #78 in Cash Box (in June), and at #80 on the Billboard Hot 100. Mike Gentile from Motown tried to sign Wilmer, but during a talk between Wilmer and Junior Walker at the "Warehouse" after Junior described how his hit "What Does It Take To Win Your Love" was suppressed by Motown, he decided not to sign.

"Give Me One More Chance" was a slightly bigger hit in Canada than in the band's home country, peaking at #63 on the RPM charts in July 1968. In Toronto, the single reached #18 on the CHUM chart in June, 1968, and hit #8 at rival station CKEY. This would be the only Canadian chart action for the band, which at the time was billed as Wilmer Alexander Jr., and the Dukes.

A 1968 follow-up single, "Heavy Time", failed to chart. However, the single's B-side, the Jagger/Richards composition "I'm Free", did chart in the top 30 on radio stations in both Syracuse and Rochester. This same song would much later be a hit for the Soup Dragons.

The band's one album (credited to Wilmer and the Dukes) was released in 1969 by Aphrodisiac Records. The album featured "Give Me One More Chance", "Heavy Time" and "I'm Free", as well as two more singles pulled from the album: "Living In The USA", written by Steve Miller, and "Get Out of My Life, Woman", written by Allen Toussaint. Released in the summer of 1969, "Living In The USA" was another regional hit for the band in upper New York state (and also a top 40 hit in Detroit), but the song only made it to #114 on the Billboard 'bubbling under' chart, and failed to break out nationally beyond these markets. "Get Out of My Life, Woman", released in October, did not even bubble under, although it did see chart action in Pittsburgh.

In the summer of 1969, Wilmer hired a young wind section to match the current sounds of BST, James Brown, and Wilson Pickett; namely Frank Grasso-Trumpet, Steve Weinstein-Trombone, and Peter Kanyuk- Woodwinds.

Their manager later brought them to Detroit, but their work never really caught on outside of the lower Great Lakes region. Still, although the original members never recorded after 1969, their live shows were a consistent draw in upper New York state, and Wilmer and the Dukes gigged steadily in and around Syracuse, Rochester and Buffalo (playing several gigs at the Warehouse, in Kirkwood, New York) until they broke up in 1974.

=== Reunion and "The Legendary Dukes" ===
In 1988, the group reformed for a series of sold-out benefit concerts to help pay some medical bills for the ailing Alexander. Thereafter, various members (without Alexander) continued touring as The Legendary Dukes. The Dukes original organist, Ralph Gillotte, died in 1999; Ron Alberts, the last original band member, retired in 2004.

The band continued to play, albeit with no original members, for several years afterward. Eric "Mitty" Moore retired as front man and lead singer of the Legendary Dukes on January 1, 2011 after over 20 years with the band. Trombone player David DeWitt retired on September 10, 2011, after 16 years with the Legendary Dukes. He had been the primary business manager and horn section leader for the group, creating complex and often intricate horn arrangements for the band. Most of the rest of the band left in September and October 2011.

Finally on March 28, 2012, the band released the following statement announcing the break-up of the band on the group's Facebook page:

To all of the fans and longtime supporters of the Legendary Dukes, during the past year we lost half of our band members in key positions due to financial, personal and professional reasons. Unfortunately, despite desperate attempts to get replacement members, we could not keep things moving forward with all the personnel changes within that short of a period.

The Legendary Dukes and the band that they grew out of... Wilmer Alexander Jr. and the Dukes, have enjoyed a fifty seven year run... no mean feat considering the life expectancy of any band whether local or a national . The people that have made that possible are a special breed. To try to continue on without replacements cut from that same "cloth" would be an impossibility. Sadly it has left us with only one course of action and that is to disband.

We know The Dukes and our music meant a lot to many people as did it to us. We would like to thank you all for your support and the memories. Also a very special thank you for the people that became part of our extended family: The Buffalo Launch Club in Grand Island NY, Saint Gabriele's and the "Soul Patrol “in Elma, NY, The Blue Moon Ball Staff at the Corning Glass Museum, Corning NY, All of our Canadian friends up north, The Buffalo Irish Club, Buffalo, NY, The Brew Haus in Orchard Park, NY, Root 5 in Hamburg, NY, The City of Buffalo NY, Batavia Downs Grandstands Restaurant, Finger Lakes Gaming & Race Track in Farmington, NY, and the many others that supported us over the years...and last but certainly not least Jim and Patty Clinton of the River Grille in North Tonawanda NY. So for one last time "Thank you for supporting live music because it's people like you that allow us to do what we do" ....The Legendary Dukes.

In April, 2015, Wilmer and the Dukes were inducted into the Rochester, N.Y. Music Hall of Fame.

== Discography ==
=== Wilmer and The Dukes ===
- Wilmer and the Dukes, 1969, Aphrodisiac Records, APH6001 (reissued 1999, Forevermore Records, ASIN B000005D6L)

Songs:

- "Living in the U.S.A."
- "Count on Me"
- "Get Out of My Life, Woman"
- "I Do Love You"
- "Love-Itis/Show Me"
- "Heavy Time"
- "St. James Infirmary"
- "Get It" (instrumental)
- "I'm Free"
- "Give Me One More Chance"
- "Gettin' Over You"
- "But It's Alright"

=== The Legendary Dukes ===
- Committed To Soul, 1994, Forevermore Records

Songs:

- "Bring The Magic Back"
- "Baby, Now That I Found You"
- "One Way Ticket"
- "Rock Steady"
- "It Won't Be Wrong"
- "I Still Do"
- "Mountain Of Love"
- "I Got The Will"
- "You Are All I Need"
- "Obsession"
- "Happy Ever After"
- "Them Changes"
- "Whiter Shade Of Pale" (Bonus Track)

- See The World From The Side Of The Road, 2004, self-released

Songs:

- "White Boy" (Instrumental)
- "Yellow Moon"
- "It's Your Thing"
- "What's Going On"
- "Give Me One More Chance"
- "Have A Little Faith In Me"
- "Evil Ways"
- "Jailhouse Rock"
- "Magic Carpet Ride"
- "Drift Away"
