= Scott Friedman =

Scott Friedman may refer to:

- Scott L. Friedman (born 1955), American scientist, professor, and physician
- Scott E. Friedman (born 1958), American author and attorney
