= Tommy Calandra =

American music songwriter, performer and producer

- Also known as: Tom Calandra
- Born: Thomas John Calandra; November 25, 1941; Buffalo, New York, USA
- Died: July 19, 1998 (aged 56) Buffalo, New York, USA
- Genres: Blues rock, Garage rock, Alternative rock
- Occupations: music songwriter, performer, producer, mentor
- Instrument: bass guitar
- Years active: 1955-1998
- Spouse: Edith A. Ricchiazzi

Tommy Calandra (November 25, 1941 – July 19, 1998) was an American music songwriter, performer, producer, recording engineer and mentor. Bass player for Raven, writer of Buffalo radio jingles, founder of BCMK Recording Studios and BCMK Records.

== Early life ==
Calandra was born in Buffalo, NY, the youngest of ten children, born to Dominic and Carmella Middione Calandra. Both of his parents were born in Italy. His father died when he was three years old. He is a graduate of Lafayette High School. As a teenager, he began playing drums and piano and later bass guitar and joined the band Sonic Tones.

== Career ==
Calandra learned to play the Fender Bass and began playing around Buffalo with a band named Royal Flames. He joined a band called the Premiers and in 1961 joined Stan and the Ravens. Then he played with the Rising Sons, a blues band that played at the Inferno at Glen Park in Williamsville, NY. With the help of disc jockey Joey Reynolds, they recorded and released a record on Swan Records.

=== Raven ===
Their success at The Inferno led to them being booked at The Scene on 8th Avenue at 48th Street in New York City, where they changed their name to Raven in honor of Stan Szelest. At The Scene they became friends with other performers including Jimi Hendrix and Janice Joplin. Hendrix once used Tommy's guitar in a practice session and wanted to buy it but Calandra would not sell it to him.

In Boston they opened for Led Zeppelin and Jimmy Page said they had one of the "best guitar players in the world".

Beatle George Harrison sent Peter Asher to sign the band with Apple Records, saying "Raven is one of the best American bands I've ever heard." They signed, instead, with Columbia Records. They toured the US and England but turned down an invitation to perform at the Woodstock in August 1969. In March 1970, they returned to Buffalo and performed a homecoming concert at Kleinhans Music Hall. The group disbanded later that year citing differing musical outlooks and pressures resulting from attempts to make them a popular hit group. Calandra said "I just want to go and play my piano and play my songs".

In early 1971, Calandra began playing his clever funny songs with his honky-tonk piano and kazoo in a band he created named Beak. They played at The One-Eyed Cat and other clubs around Buffalo. In 1972, WKBW program director Jefferson Kaye invited him to write musical editorials.

In 1975, as the Buffalo Sabres ice hockey team advanced to the Stanley Cup finals, Calandra wrote and recorded We're Gonna Win That Cup, recruiting entertainer Donna McDaniel to sing the song. The song was an instant hit. It was sung by Sabres players in the locker room and became one of Buffalo's best known sports songs.

=== Buffalo College of Musical Knowledge ===
Calandra had long been interested in music production and in 1977 he founded the Buffalo College of Musical Knowledge (BCMK) to produce promotional jingles and editorial commentaries in his basement studio at his North Buffalo home. He credits Jeff Kaye with giving him the direction he needed to become successful with his musical editorials which were played on more than 500 radio stations nationwide.

One of his best known original jingles was written for WKBW disc jockey Danny Neaverth: "Danny moves my fanny in the morning". Calandra began receiving requests for the same jingle for air personalities at radio stations throughout the US, Canada and as far away as New Zealand.

By the late 1980s the business had expanded to the point that Calandra moved his BCMK studio and his six employees to Delaware Avenue in North Buffalo.

Calandra was one of the key supporters of locally produced original music. Hundreds of young musicians made their first recording in the BCMK studio. BCMK was a workshop for Buffalo's Alternative rock bands. Calandra said "the thrill for me is to do something that I love. Music, not money, will always come first at BCMK".

== Awards and honors ==
- Buffalo Music Hall of Fame 1998
- Buffalo Music Hall of Fame as a member of Raven 2009

== Personal life ==
In 1975, Calandra married the former Edith A. Ricchiazzi (1950-2023), sister of his business manager, Frank Ricchiazzi. Edith was first attracted to Tommy because of his humor. She said she married him because he made her laugh. He was a funny guy. They had one son. Calandra died at age 56 on 19 July 1998. Calandra and his wife are buried at Mount Calvary Cemetery in Cheektowaga, New York.
