= Amherst State Park =

State park in Erie County, New York

- Location within New York
- Interactive map of Amherst State Park
- Type: State park
- Location: 400 Mill Street; Williamsville, New York
- Nearest city: Williamsville, New York
- Coordinates: 42°58′15″N 78°44′55″W
- Area: 80 acres (0.32 km^{2})
- Created: 2000
- Operator: Town of Amherst; New York State Office of Parks, Recreation and Historic Preservation
- Open: All year
- Website: Amherst State Park

Amherst State Park is an 80-acre (0.32 km^{2}) park in Erie County, New York, United States. The park is located northeast of Buffalo, partially in the Village of Williamsville with the balance located in the Town of Amherst. The park is managed by the Town of Amherst under an agreement with the New York State Office of Parks, Recreation and Historic Preservation.

== History ==
The property that now hosts the park was formerly part of the St. Mary of the Angels Convent, operated by the Sisters of St. Francis at that location since 1923. The convent was put up for sale in 1999.

The property was acquired by the Town of Amherst and New York State in January 2000, after both entities evenly split the $5 million price to purchase the former convent and surrounding area. New York State owns 77 acres (0.31 km^{2}) of the property while the Town of Amherst owns the remaining three acres (1.2 ha) of the park's lands. Under an agreement with the state, the town is responsible for managing the property for the purpose of conservation and to make space available for passive recreation.

The convent's former motherhouse complex was listed on the National Register of Historic Places in 2002. It was approved for sale by the town in November 2002, with the intent to allow development of a 102-unit senior housing facility, and is not included in the park. The facility opened in 2004.

The area was formerly called "Williamsville Glen".

== Park facilities ==
Amherst State Park is located adjacent to Ellicott Creek, and features nature trails and biking trails that are open to the general public. Dogs are permitted, however they must be kept on a leash at all times. The main access point is at 400 Mill Street in Williamsville.

== See also ==
- List of New York state parks
