= Glen Park (Williamsville, New York) =

Park in Williamsville, New York, United States

Coordinates: 42.96489°N 78.74466°W

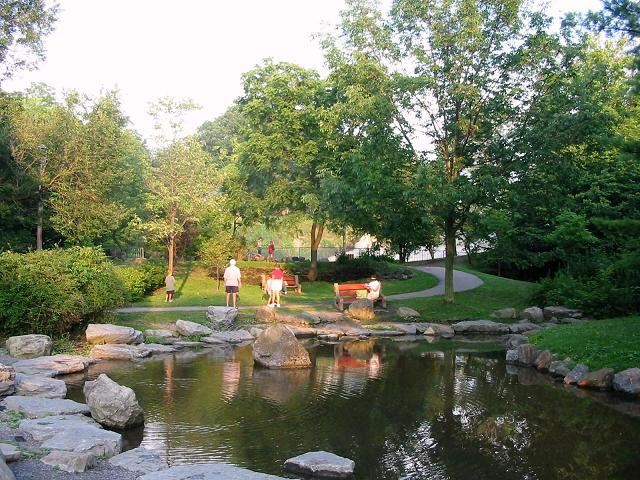
View of Glen Park.

Glen Park is a walking park in Williamsville, New York. It is bordered by the Glen Falls waterfall on Ellicott Creek, and the inactive Williamsville Water Mill.

== History ==
The location originally housed an amusement park, Harry Altman's Glen Park Casino and Amusement Park. The property was razed following two fires.

The nightclub was notable for featuring the bands Wilmer & the Dukes and Raven (formerly Tony Galla and the Rising Sons) on a weekly basis, which helped launch their careers. In addition, national recording acts such as Junior Walker & the All Stars, The Butterfield Blues Band, Sly and the Family Stone, Ike & Tina Turner, The Bob Seger System, The Esquires, Gary Puckett & the Union Gap, Wilson Pickett, Wayne Cochran & the CC Riders, and Arthur Conley also played this famous nightclub.

=== The Inferno in 1968 ===
The first fire in September 1968 destroyed a nightclub on the property called The Inferno. The Inferno was formerly the "Glen Casino".

=== Underground 1973 ===
The second fire in September 1973 destroyed several buildings, including the lower building called the "Underground".

Altman, his son-in-law Dave Goldstein and grandson Steve Goldstein had hosted many famous entertainers at the Glen Casino over the years, including Sammy Davis Jr., Frank Sinatra Jr., Jayne Mansfield, Dick Shawn, Joey Bishop, Jerry Vale, The Three Stooges, and the Mills Brothers.

The Casino was built in the 1940s and housed both a theater and a restaurant. In 1966, Kevin Elliott, a local promoter, sold Harry Altman the idea to convert the nightclub into a rock 'n roll venue. It was also the springboard for the Inferno house band, named the Rising Sons. This local group featuring Tony Galla on vocals, Jim Calire on piano, John Weitz lead guitar, Tommy Calandra on bass guitar, Gary Mallaber on drums, became national recording artists known as Raven managed by music executive, Marty Angelo. Raven recorded a live album entitled, "Live at the Inferno" which was later released in 1969. The front cover of the album is a photo of the fire-razed nightspot.

In 1976, the park was converted to its current state with the installation of several ponds and concrete walking paths. It has since been owned and maintained jointly by the Village of Williamsville and the Town of Amherst.
