= Ellicott Creek Park =

Park in New York, United States

- Location within New York
- Type: Regional park
- Location: 1 Ellicott Creek Drive; Tonawanda, New York
- Nearest city: Tonawanda
- Coordinates: 43°1′22″N 78°49′59″W
- Area: 165 acres (0.67 km^{2})
- Created: 1926
- Operator: Erie County Department of Parks, Recreation and Forestry
- Open: All year
- Website: Ellicott Creek Park

Ellicott Creek Park is a 165-acre (0.67 km^{2}) park in Erie County, in the U.S. state of New York. The park is in the Town of Tonawanda, northeast of Buffalo, New York. The park lies between Tonawanda Creek and Ellicott Creek. Access is free and it is open to the public year-round. It is the smallest multi-purpose park operated by the Erie County Department of Parks, Recreation and Forestry.

== History ==
Ellicott Creek Park was among the first parks developed by Erie County. The park was established in 1926 with the county's purchase of 40 acres (0.16 km^{2}) of formerly private land, and was expanded in 1936 and 1937 through the annexation of county tax foreclosures. The park's facilities and landscapes were improved substantially by the Works Progress Administration (WPA) throughout the 1930s. Ellicott Island was constructed to improve navigation on Ellicott Creek with the guidance of landscape architect Charles Ellicott.

The park's popularity peaked in the 1930s and 1940s. However, the park's facilities were neglected and fell into disrepair between the 1970s and early 1990s, and the park soon earned a negative reputation. Following increased county attention leading to repairs at the park in the late 1990s, the park's popularity and attendance once again increased.

== Facilities ==
- Since January 2014, the park's island has been a designated "Bark Park," where dogs are allowed to run un-leashed.
- The Ellicott Creek Bike Path and the Erie Canalway Trail pass through the park.
- The park features a soccer field, fishing access, tennis courts, playgrounds, and a canoe launch.
- An 18-hole disc golf course was installed in 2010.
- In the winter, a sledding hill and un-groomed cross-country skiing trails are available.
- Electric vehicle (EV) chargers have been installed in the park.
