= Sameera Fazili =

American business executive and government official

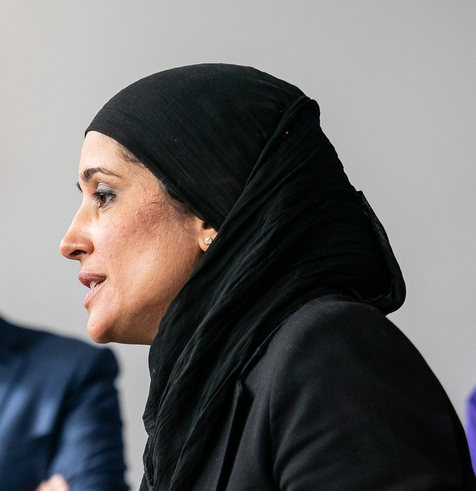
- Fazili in 2021

Deputy Director of the National Economic Council for Manufacturing, Innovation and Domestic Competition
- In office January 20, 2021 – December 2, 2022
- President: Joe Biden
- Director: Brian Deese
- Preceded by: Position established

Personal details
- Born: Williamsville, New York
- Party: Democratic
- Education: Harvard University (BA); Yale University (JD)

Sameera Fazili is an American attorney who served as a deputy director of the National Economic Council in the Biden administration. A community development finance expert, Fazili previously served as Director of Engagement for the Federal Reserve Bank of Atlanta.

== Early life ==
Born in Williamsville, New York, Fazili is a native of Buffalo. Fazili is the daughter of Dr. Mohammad Yusuf Fazili and Dr. Rafiqa Fazili, who immigrated to the United States from the Valley of Kashmir. After attending Elmwood Franklin School, Fazili graduated from the Nichols School in 1996.

Fazili earned a bachelor's degree in social sciences from Harvard College, graduating with magna cum laude. She later obtained her Juris Doctor (JD) from Yale Law School.

== Career ==
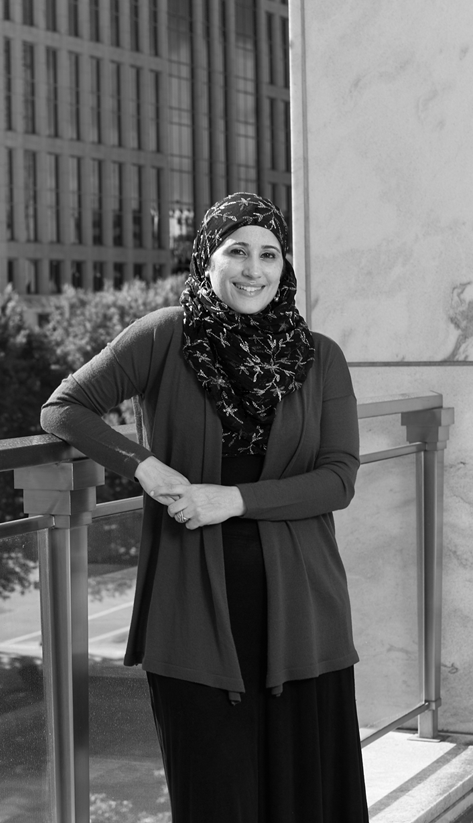
Fazili while at the Federal Reserve of Atlanta

Fazili started as a clinical lecturer at Yale Law School's community and economic development unit.

She expanded the clinic's work to international microfinance and helped start a community development financial institution (CDFI) bank. She also worked at a CDFI bank called ShoreBank, said to be the first such bank in the US.

Later Fazili worked as an advisor in the US Treasury Department on issues related to CDFIs, housing finance and small business finance, and was also a senior adviser and chief of staff to Treasury's Under Secretary for International Affairs.

=== National Economic Council ===
Fazili served in the Obama administration as a senior policy adviser in the National Economic Council, where she covered retirement, consumer finance and community and economic development issues. Afterwards, she worked for the Federal Reserve Bank of Atlanta as the Director of Engagement in its community and economic development department.

As a deputy director of the National Economic Council in the Biden administration, Fazili focused on manufacturing, innovation and domestic competition. In this capacity, she was tasked with advising the White House on global supply chain issues. Fazili left her position at the NEC in December 2022.

== Human rights advocacy ==
Before law school, Fazili worked at Karamah: Muslim Women Lawyers for Human Rights. Her experience in human rights includes working at the World Health Organization and United Nations High Commission for Refugees (UNHCR), on missions in Palestine, Kashmir, and Pakistan. She is an activist for religious freedom and international human rights.

Fazili has supported 'Stand with Kashmir', a Kashmiri diaspora-led international solidarity movement, and has opposed the Indian government's revocation of the special status of the state of Jammu and Kashmir.

== Personal life ==
Fazili is married and has three children. She lives in Atlanta, Georgia and has extended family in Kashmir. Fazili is a practicing Muslim.

Her sister, Yousra Fazili is a noted human rights lawyer who testified at the November 2019 US congressional hearing on the revocation of the special status of Jammu and Kashmir. Fazili's cousin Mubeen Shah was among those detained by the Indian government the Public Safety Act (PSA) during the 2019–2021 lockdown in Jammu & Kashmir.
