= W. H. Clatworthy =

Willard H. Clatworthy (October 16, 1915 – February 15, 2010) was a professor emeritus from University at Buffalo and a World War II veteran from Williamsville, New York. He is known for his work in BIBD designs and combinatorial mathematics. Clatworthy received his Ph.D. in the year 1952 from the University of North Carolina at Chapel Hill under the direction of R. C. Bose; Clatworthy authored papers with S. S. Shrikhande, and J. M. Cameron on BIBD designs.

== Career ==
Clatworthy was born in Auxier, Kentucky. He graduated from Berea College, the University of Kentucky. He served on the USS Wyoming (BB-32) and reached the rank of lieutenant before leaving the U.S. Navy in 1945. Clatworthy worked at the Milwaukee School of Engineering, Wayne State University in Detroit, the University of North Carolina, Westinghouse Electric Corporation in Pittsburgh and with the National Bureau of Standards in Washington, D.C. In 1962, he took a position as a professor in the mathematics department at University at Buffalo. In 1965 he was elected as a Fellow of the American Statistical Association. He retired in 1987.

== Select publications ==
- Tables of two-associate-class partially balanced designs, WH Clatworthy, JM Cameron, RC Bose, JA … - 1973 - US Dept. of Commerce, National …
- Some Theorems for Partially Balanced Designs, W. S. Connor and W. H. Clatworthy, Ann. Math. Statist. Volume 25, Number 1 (1954), 100-112.
