= Mario J. Rossetti =

American judge

Mario J. Rossetti (October 23, 1935 – July 8, 2014) was an American jurist.

Born in Worcester, Massachusetts, Rosetti went to Grover Cleveland High School in Buffalo, New York. He received his bachelor's degree from University at Buffalo, The State University of New York and his law degree from University at Buffalo Law School. He practiced law. He served on the New York Supreme Court and then the New York Court of Claims retiring in 2006. He died at his home in Williamsville, New York.
