= Lyman C. Pettit =

Pentecostal Collegiate Institute founder and president

Rev. Dr. Lyman C. Pettit

Lyman C. Pettit (October 1868 in Northumberland, New York – March 8, 1950 in Lockport, New York) was the founder and first president of the Pentecostal Collegiate Institute (now Eastern Nazarene College); the founding pastor of both the Congregational Methodist Church of Saratoga Springs, and the First People's Church of Brooklyn, New York; and an ordained clergyman who was the pastor of churches in the Methodist Episcopal Church, the Association of Pentecostal Churches of America (a forerunner to the Church of the Nazarene), and the Presbyterian Church in the United States of America.

== Biographical summary ==
=== Family and early years ===
Lyman Clayton Pettit was born in Northumberland, New York in October 1868, the oldest child of Orville Daniel Pettit (born October 1832 in Saratoga, New York; died 25 May 1905 in Northumberland, New York), a retail grocer; and Sarah Frances Robinson Pettit (born 8 July 1849 in Northumberland, New York; died 27 April 1922 in Buffalo, New York, who had married on 6 September 1866 at the Reformed Protestant Dutch Church of Gansevoort, New York. After the birth of their oldest child, Orville and Sarah had four more children: Charles Warren Pettit (born 10 May 1869 in Northumberland, New York; died 20 November 1931 in Middleport, New York). Mira A. Pettit (born Oct 1870 in Northumberland, New York; died 6 Oct 1915 in Northumberland, New York); Orville Bertrum "Bertie" Pettit (born 7 October 1873 in Northumberland, New York; died 21 March 1941 in Niagara Falls, New York); and Alvadore "Allie" Franklin Pettit (born 10 August 1878 in Northumberland, New York; died 13 September 1956 in Glens Falls, New York).

By July 1870, Pettit was living with his parents, and younger brother, Charles, in Northumberland, New York, where his father was employed as a retail grocer, and who was also Town Clerk of Northumberland in 1869 and 1873; By June 1880 Pettit was living with his grandfather, Lyman Robinson (born about 1830 in New York), a farmer; his grandmother, Almira Robinson (born about 1832 in New York); and one of his younger brothers, Bertie, on the Robinson farm in Northumberland, New York. Pettit's father, Orville D. Pettit, was now a school teacher, who also lived in Northumberland, with his wife, Sarah, and three of their children: Charles, Mira, and Allie.

About 1888 Pettit married Minnie Hettrich (born January 1869 in New York), the youngest child of Prussian immigrants, John P. Hettrich (born about 1823 in Hamburg, Prussia), a tailor, whose store was then at 463 Broadway Avenue in Saratoga Springs; and Louisa Hettrich (born about 1832 in Hamburg, Prussia). Pettit and his wife had only one child, a son: Lyman Hettrich Pettit (born 10 May 1889 in Hyndsville, New York; died 19 February 1922 in Newark, New Jersey).

=== Education and honors ===
Pettit was educated at the Methodist-sponsored Central New York Conference Seminary (now Cazenovia College), at Cazenovia, New York, "the second Methodist seminary to be established in the United States", and from its inception in 1824 one of the first co-educational schools in the nation. After completion of his pre-college studies, Pettit completed four years at the Syracuse College seminary in Syracuse, New York. By 1914 Pettit was listed as having a Ph.D., however from 1921 he was listed as having received a Doctor of Divinity (D.D.) degree. A 1925 source indicates Pettit had a Doctor of Sacred Theology (S.T.D.).

=== Personal ===
Pettit was "an impressive person, with a commanding personality and a natural gift for oratory."

== Ministry ==
=== Methodist Episcopal Church (1887–1895) ===
==== Gansevoort Methodist Episcopal Church (1887–1889) ====
By 1887 Pettit, while still a Methodist local preacher, was granted a licence to preach, and was assigned to the Gansevoort Methodist Episcopal Church. At the 1887 Conference there was a report that "A gracious revival influence has pervaded the district, and a majority of charges have gathered a precious harvest of souls". Among those churches that receiving a large "ingathering" was Gansevoort. In April 1888 Pettit was ordained as a deacon in the Methodist Episcopal Church by Bishop Cyrus David Foss (born 17 January 1834 in Kingston, New York; died 29 January 1910 in Philadelphia, Pennsylvania). Pettit was ordained as a traveling deacon of the first class, which is the beginning of a two-year probation period towards ordination as an Elder in the Methodist Episcopal Church, which authorised him to "baptize and perform the office of matrimony in the absence of the elder; to assist the elder in administering the Lord's Supper; [and] to do all the duties of a traveling preacher."

==== Hyndsville Methodist Episcopal Church (1889-1890) ====
In 1889 Pettit was appointed as the pastor of the Hyndsville Methodist church, near Cobleskill, New York. While pastoring at Hyndsville, Pettit's only child, Lyman Hettrich Pettit, was born on 10 May 1889.

==== Chestertown Methodist Episcopal Church (1890–1893) ====
In 1890 Pettit was appointed pastor of the Methodist Episcopal church in Chestertown, New York. During his pastorate at Chestertown, there was a "most notable revival", where "about one hundred and fifty have been converted during the year, every part of the charge sharing in the gracious work."

After his graduation from seminary, Pettit was ordained at the 1892 annual Conference as an elder in the Methodist Episcopal church at Troy, New York, and elected secretary of the Troy Conference's Epworth League, the Methodist youth organization. About this time, Pettit's brother, Charles, was assigned to the Methodist church at Saratoga.

==== St. James' Methodist Episcopal Church, Cohoes (1893-1894) ====
By 1893 Pettit had replaced Rev. Henry Wright as the pastor of the St. James' Methodist Episcopal Church, located at the corner of McElwain Avenue and Walnut Street, Cohoes, New York. Pettit and his family lived in the Methodist manse at 66 McElwain Avenue. On Sunday, 15 October 1894, Pettit failed to appear to preach at the St. James' church. According to a report published the next day in The New York Times:

The congregation of St. James' Methodist Church waited until noon Sunday for the pastor, the young and eloquent Rev. L.C. Pettit, but he did not appear, nor has he been seen since. He has been suffering from nervous exhaustion for some time.

Pettit had eloped with an unnamed female, and was accused later of committing adultery. Pettit subsequently returned to his wife. Pettit and his family subsequently left Cohoes and moved to Saratoga Springs. After a complaint had been filed against him and a subsequent investigation, the Troy Conference of the Methodist Episcopal Church of 1895 voted to allow Pettit to withdraw from the Methodist church "under Charges or Complaints" and "under censure".

=== West Side Mission, Saratoga Springs (1895–1896) ===
In 1895 Pettit, his brother, Charles W. Pettit, and J.H. Lovemoney established the independent West Side Mission in a storeroom at 92 Woodlawn Avenue, Saratoga Springs with no financial backing., with Pettit becoming the superintendent. Services were held at 7.45pm on Sundays, Tuesdays, Thursdays, and Fridays, as well as another service at 4.00pm on Sundays and Sunday School at 2.30pm each week Pettit and his family resided at the Mission, and his parents lived nearby at 144 Woodlawn Avenue. In January 1896 Pettit organized from this work the Mission Circle, with a membership of sixty who were "banded together for the conversion of sinners and the spread of scriptural holiness."

=== Congregational Methodist Church, Saratoga Springs (1896-1898) ===
Just down the road from the West Side Mission, on 30 September 1896 Pettit established the Congregational Methodist Church, an independent holiness congregation, and he was chosen as the founding pastor. At that time the West Side Mission seems to have been discontinued. According to James R. Cameron, "Growth was so rapid and the church so prosperous that ground was broken for a beautiful new church and parsonage the following spring. By fall the structure was completed". at 120 Woodlawn Avenue (at the corner of Van Dam Street). Saratoga Springs, New York, While it cost more than $11,000 to build, by 1900 more than half of the mortgage was paid. The church was considered "the finest Pentecostal church building in the East at that time." Pettit and his family resided next door at 118 Woodlawn Avenue, and his parents lived at 146 Woodland Avenue. The Congregational Methodist church held services at 10.30am and 8.00pm each Sunday, with Sunday School at 2.30pm and Prayer Meeting at 7.30pm. In 1897 an additional service was added at 7.30pm on Thursdays.

=== Association of Pentecostal Churches of America (1898–1902) ===
==== Grace Pentecostal Church (1898–1902) ====
In 1898 Pettit led this congregation into an affiliation with the Association of Pentecostal Churches of America (APCA), which had been founded in 1896. Soon afterwards his brother, Rev. Charles Warren Pettit, became the pastor of the Immanuel Pentecostal Church in Glens Falls, New York. In 1898 the name of the Saratoga Springs church was changed to the Grace Pentecostal Church of Saratoga Springs, N.Y. By 1900 the church held services at 10.30am and 8.00pm on Sundays, held Sunday School at 2.30pm, and its weekly Prayer Meeting at 7.30pm on Thursdays. By 1900 the church membership was nearly one hundred, making it one of the strongest congregations in the APCA. Due to the increase in the number of churches affiliating with it, in 1900 the APCA divided its work into three districts, with Pettit chosen as one of the assistant secretaries under the supervision of Home Missions Secretary Rev. Hiram F. Reynolds. Pettit resigned as pastor as of 1 May 1902, and after a ten-week gap, was replaced by Rev. Ernest E. Angell, a Congregationalist minister.

==== Pentecostal Collegiate Institute (New York) (1900–1903) ====
Soon after he joined the APCA in 1899, Pettit began to articulate the need for a school for training preachers, missionaries and evangelists and other Christian workers for the APCA, to the extent that "Pettit was one of the main advocates for starting the Pentecostal Collegiate Institute." Hiram F. Reynolds, one of the founders of the APCA, was influential in convincing the delegates at the 4th annual meeting of the APCA in April 1899 to create a Committee on Education to "consider the matter of Pentecostal schools; to outline courses of study for training preachers, missionaries, and evangelists; and to deal with such other interests as might come before them." At the same meeting, the APCA elected a standing committee on education with Pettit as chairman and Reynolds chosen to be the financial secretary. During the following year this committee recommended the establishment of Pentecostal schools and the adoption of a course of study for preachers. The recommendation was adopted by the next annual meeting in April 1900. Pettit was chosen to be first president of the new Pentecostal Collegiate Institute and Bible Training School, however he received no salary and relied on continuing to pastor the Grace church for his support. By the summer of 1900, Pettit had recruited a faculty and the APCA's official periodical, the Beulah Christian announced that the Pentecostal Collegiate Institute would begin operation in September 1900. All faculty were required to be in the experience of entire sanctification, and the Bible was to be "the Great Textbook". During the summer of 1900 Pettit was active in recruiting students while speaking at camp meetings from Canada to Pennsylvania.

On 25 September 1900 PCI commenced with Rev. William H. Albrecht (born June 1856 in New York), a former Methodist clergyman from the New York Conference, who had recently joined the APCA, chosen to be principal, and five other teaching staff, and 51 students For the first year, PCI was based in the rented Garden View House, a disused resort hotel. The students were enrolled in PCI's high school, and its preparatory department. Unlike Bible Colleges of that day, PCI was a post-secondary school collegiate institute and for its first two years had a liberal arts program with "Latin, Greek, modern languages, art, music, and oratory" in its curriculum for ministerial students. PCI specially rejected the use of higher criticism to study the Bible. From its inception, there was a commitment to a balanced educational preparation for ministry, however "tremendous pressure was applied throughout the year to bring every student into a profession of saving and sanctifying grace. Scenes of rather unrestrained emotional fervor were characteristic." By the end of the first school term, "virtually all were converted, and most of them were sanctified wholly". During the first year, Albrecht resigned as principal, and Pettit was chosen to become his successor.

At the 6th annual meeting of the APCA held in April 1901, the standing Education Committee recommended that "a building be erected for the Pentecostal College at a cost not to exceed $20,000, provided that $10,000 in good subscriptions could be secured." The school's name was changed to the Pentecostal Collegiate Institute and Biblical Seminary. At the beginning of its second year of operation on 10 September 1901, an elementary school was added, and the enrolment had increased to 78 students: "Thirty-three enrolled in the college preparatory course, nineteen in the Biblical seminary, and twenty-six in other departments." On 17 September 1901, The New York Times reported that Pettit had purchased the Kenmore Hotel located at 556 Broadway Avenue (at the corner with Van Dam Street) in Saratoga Springs from Max Marx as the permanent location of PCI. The deeds to the three-story hotel and its 11,250 square feet (1,045 m^{2}) lot were issued in Pettit's own name rather than in the name of the PCI or the APCA. At this time Rev. David C. Thacher had become PCI's third principal, while Pettit remained President of PCI, as well as chairman of the executive committee. Other members of that committee were: Secretary: Rev. Joseph Caldwell Bearse (born 4 October 1869 in South Chatham, Massachusetts; died 2 July 1931 in South Portland, Maine), then pastor of the APCA Church at Malden, Massachusetts; Financial Secretary: Rev. Hiram F. Reynolds; and Treasurer: Rev. Charles H. BeVier (born 5 September 1858; died about 1905), then pastor of the John Wesley Pentecostal Church in Brooklyn, New York. Pettit continued to serve as the pastor of the Grace Pentecostal Church.

At the 7th annual meeting of the APCA held in April 1902, Pettit reported that "the number of faculty members had increased to fourteen and the enrollment had nearly doubled. The school building, including furnishings throughout, had been purchased at a cost of $16,500." Further, Pettit indicated that for his administration the purpose of PCI was that "the school might be not only a holiness college but a holy college striving to spread scriptural holiness throughout the world." Due to conflicts with Pettit over unauthorised expenditures and unfunded debt levels, the Education Committee of the APCA decided to dismiss Pettit and disown PCI at its 1902 meeting. They also decided to sell the property of the school "as soon as sale could be effected advantageously", and relocate to a new site at North Scituate, Rhode Island. According to official Nazarene historian Timothy L. Smith:

Pettit's zeal outran the limits of financial wisdom, and his personal life fell far short of the heights which he proclaimed in his sermon oratory. A new building, purchased in the summer of 1901 for $16,500, remained heavily in debt. Bills for improvements and operating expenses were secured by a second mortgage of dubious legality. The property turned out at last to have been deeded entirely to Pettit. These facts did not become clear, however, until May 1902, when H. Brown visited Saratoga to investigate rumors of fanaticism and questionable moral conduct on the part of the leaders of the school. Brown found the rumors amply confirmed.

In late April 1902 Pettit withdrew from the APCA, and continued to operate the school himself until it closed in February 1903. However, Pettit was unable to meet the mortgage commitments, and filed for bankruptcy on 29 August 1903 with debts of $26,483 and assets of $22,124. In 1904 Pettit was declared bankrupt. Rev. William Howard Hoople, one of the founders of the APCA, who had been elected superintendent of home missions for APCA in April 1904, argued that the APCA should assume certain debts of PCI in Saratoga. When the APCA refused to accept responsibility for some of the Saratoga debts, Hoople resigned as superintendent of home missions.

=== First People's Church of Brooklyn (1905–1911) ===
After Pettit was rejected for ministry and membership in the Presbyterian Church, in 1905 Pettit and his family moved to Brooklyn, New York and established the First People's Church of Brooklyn, New York, at 45th Street and 12th Avenue in Borough Park, Brooklyn, with himself as founding pastor. Its 1906 Manual described it as "Evangelical in doctrine" and "Congregational in government". Pettit described the church as undenominational and "purely evangelical". By 1911 the church membership was 127 and increasing. By the time Pettit resigned as pastor in early July 1911, the church property was valued at $30,000. On Sunday 23 July 1911, the congregation voted to affiliate with the Disciples of Christ, becoming the Borough Park Christian Church, with Rev. Roland J. Nichols of Indiana becoming pastor of the hundred member congregation.

=== Presbyterian Church in the United States of America (1911–1941) ===
In 1911 Pettit became a minister in the Presbyterian Church in the United States of America.

==== Hornell, New York (1911-1914) ====
From 1911 Pettit pastored a Presbyterian church in Hornell, New York.

==== Greene Avenue Presbyterian Church, Brooklyn, New York (1914-1918) ====
In 1914 Pettit became the pastor of the Greene Avenue Presbyterian Church located at 957-63 Greene Avenue (between Reid and Patchen Avenues) in the Eastern District of Brooklyn. Pettit and Minnie; his son, Lyman H. Pettit (and his wife, Clara Gertrude Hodge (born about 1891 in Pennsylvania), and their two children) who by 1917 was a salesman for the Remington Typewriter Company and a ministerial student at the Bloomfield Theological Seminary in Bloomfield, New Jersey; lived at 961 Greene Avenue, Brooklyn.

==== West Presbyterian Church, Newark, New Jersey (1919–1925) ====
On 20 February 1919 Pettit was installed as the pastor of the West Presbyterian Church at the corner of Littleton Street and Eleventh Avenue in Newark, New Jersey. Pettit and his wife, Minnie, lived nearby at 59 Littleton Avenue, with their son, Lyman H. Pettit, who was a salesman for a rubber company, and his wife, Clara, and their children: Lincoln H. (born February 12, 1911, in New York), Virginia M. (born 1913 in New York); and Lucille A. (born May 1919 in New Jersey). Also living with the Pettit family were two of Minnie's sisters, Elizabeth Hettrich (born about 1861 in New York), a spinster; and Isabella Aldrich (born about 1858 in New York), who was divorced; and Isabella's daughter, Ruth I. Aldrich (born 1896), who was a school teacher. On February 19, 1922, Lyman H. died and was buried in Saratoga Springs on February 21, 1922. Within one year of Pettit's arrival, the church membership increased significantly. Despite the largeness of the congregation, Pettit resigned in 1925 due to Minnie's health, and because her doctor recommended the clearer country air.

==== First Presbyterian Church, Thompsonville, Connecticut (1926–1927) ====
On 9 March 1926, in a special session of the Connecticut Valley Presbytery, Pettit was admitted to the presbytery so that he could become the pastor of the First Presbyterian church, the first Presbyterian church in the state, at the corner of Church and North Main Street, Thompsonville, Connecticut, the urban center of Enfield, Connecticut.

==== People's Presbyterian Church, Bridgeport, Connecticut (1927–1931) ====
On 9 January 1927 Pettit was elected pastor of the People's Presbyterian Church at 42 Laurel Avenue, Bridgeport, Connecticut, in controversial circumstances. Conducted during the Fundamentalist–Modernist Controversy within the Presbyterian Church in the United States of America, Pettit was supported by the older church members who were described as fundamentalists, against six other candidates including Rev. Clifford L. Le Duc (born about 1891), then pastor of the Bethesda Presbyterian Church in Philadelphia, Pennsylvania, a candidate they perceived to be a modernist, winning with a vote of 73 to 48. Pettit's starting salary was voted to be $3,600 per annum and use of the church manse at 36 Laurel Avenue. Pettit started his pastorate on 15 February 1927, and according to John B. Wynkoop, the church's financial secretary, in an interview on 2 February 1928: "Since Dr. Pettit became pastor of our church, one hundred new members have been added to our church." Additionally, the increase in church membership, Sunday School and Young People's work necessitated extensive additions costing $27,0000, including an extension in the size of the Sunday School facilities. In an attempt to identify itself with the conservative reaction to increasing liberalism within Presbyterianism, in 1930 the church changed its name to the Westminster Presbyterian church, reflecting the actions of J. Gresham Machen who had left Princeton Theological Seminary to form the Westminster Seminary in 1929.

==== Calvary Presbyterian Church, Lockport, New York (1931–1941) ====
By 1931 Pettit was living in Williamsville, New York. In March 1931 Pettit conducted evangelistic services in nearby Clarence, New York in the northeast part of Erie County. On 13 August 1931 the Amherst Bee reported that Pettit had accepted the call to pastor the Calvary Presbyterian Church (founded 1878) at 232 South Street, Lockport, New York. Pettit was pastor at this church until 1942, and the Pettits lived at 226 South Street.

== Later years and death ==
Pettit and his wife, Minnie, continued living in Lockport, New York. Minnie died in January 1945. Pettit remained in Lockport until his death there on Wednesday, March 8, 1950.
