= Williamsville Water Mill Complex =

- U.S. National Register of Historic Places
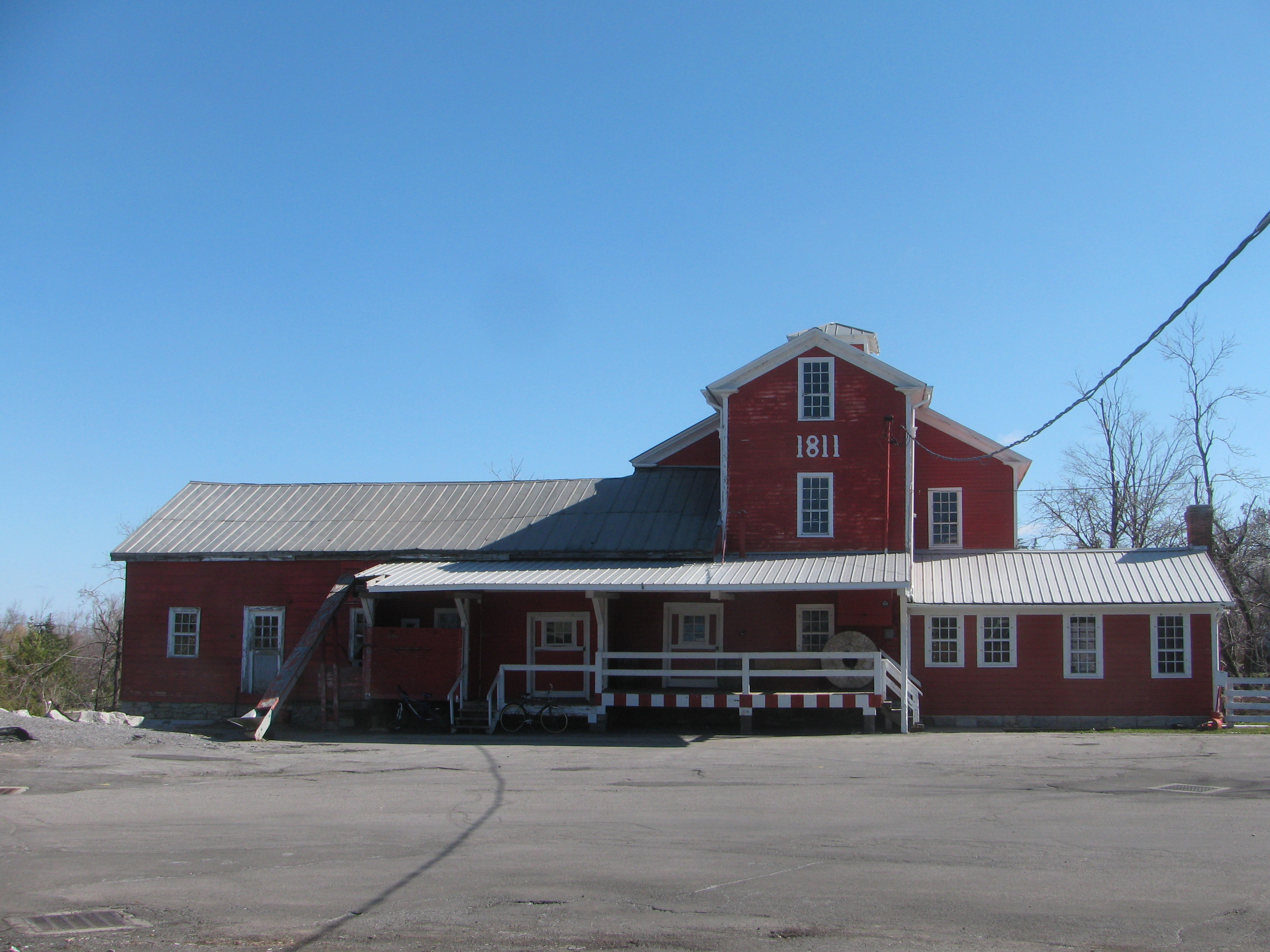
- Williamsville Water Mill Complex, April 2009

- Location within New York Location within the United States
- Location: 56 and 60 Spring St., Williamsville, New York
- Coordinates: 42°57′49.75″N 78°44′41.02″W
- Built: 1827
- Architect: Smith, Oziel
- Architectural style: Federal
- NRHP reference No.: 83001675
- Added to NRHP: September 22, 1983

Williamsville Water Mill Complex is a historic mill located at Williamsville in Erie County, New York. It was built originally as a sawmill in 1801, substantially enlarged in 1827, and operated in that capacity until 1903. Also on the site was the Water-Lime Works and Williamsville Cement Company mills, which were later converted to gristmills. After 1908, the mills were used for apple cider production. The complex is a rare surviving example of a water-powered seat of local industry in Western New York.

It was listed on the National Register of Historic Places in 1983.

In 2014, Sweet Jenny's Ice Cream renovated and moved into the mill, where they continue to draw business from those visiting Glen Park.
