= Entranceway at Main Street at Lafayette Boulevard =

- U.S. National Register of Historic Places
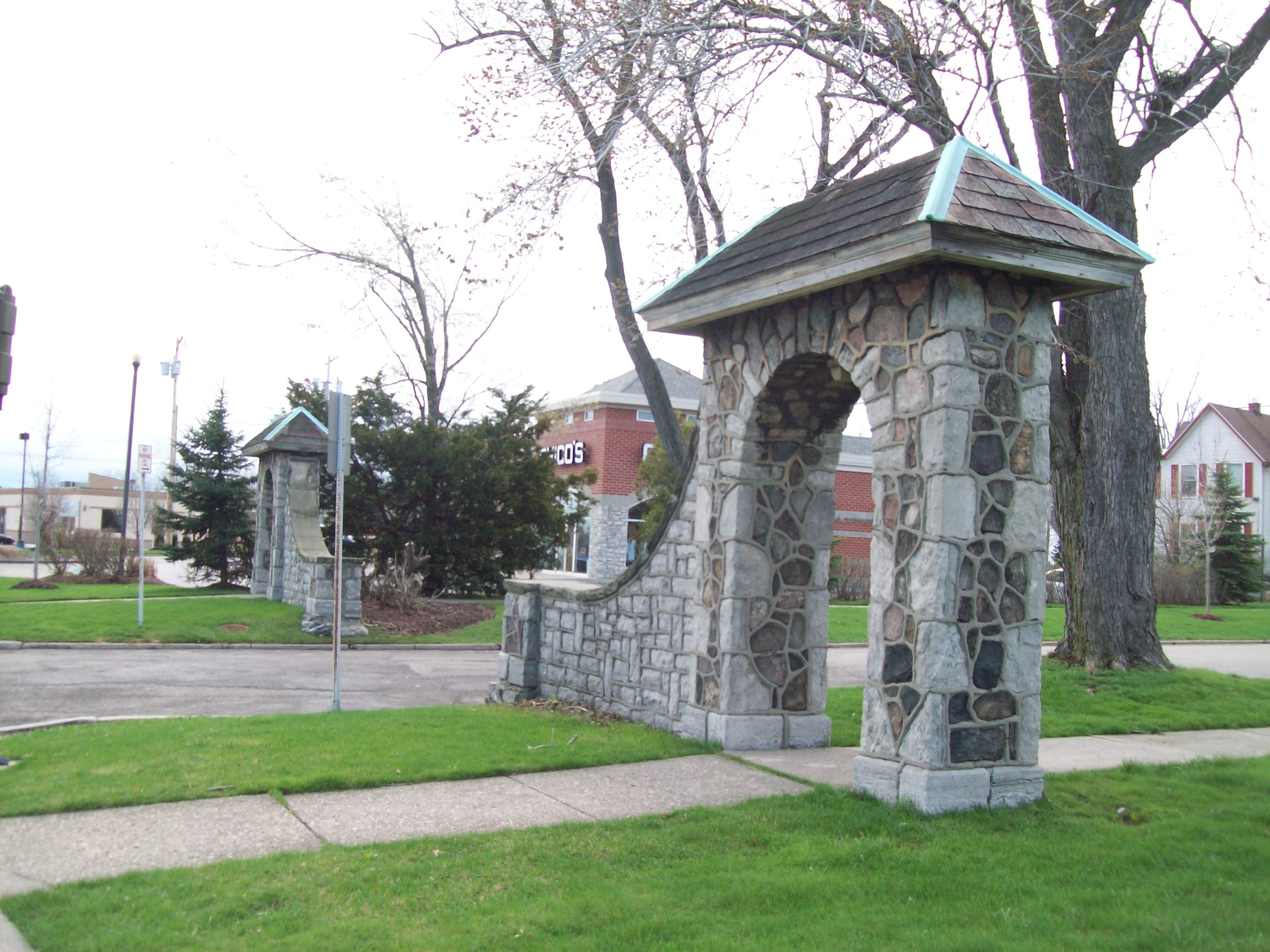
- Entranceway at Main Street at Lafayette Boulevard, April 2010

- Location within New York Location within the United States
- Location: Main St., jct. with Lafayette Boulevard, Amherst, New York
- Coordinates: 42°57′52.15″N 78°48′1.33″W
- Built: 1920
- Architect: Orange & Black Corp., Developers
- MPS: Suburban Development of Buffalo, New York MPS
- NRHP reference No.: 09000556
- Added to NRHP: July 23, 2009

Entranceway at Main Street at Lafayette Boulevard is a suburban residential subdivision entranceway built about 1920 by Orange & Black Corp., Developers. It is located on Main Street (New York State Route 5) in the town of Amherst within Erie County. It consists of roofed stone archways, connecting half-height stone walls, and stone posts located on either corner.

It was added to the National Register of Historic Places in 2009.
