= Entranceway at Main Street at Westfield Road and Ivyhurst Road =

- U.S. National Register of Historic Places
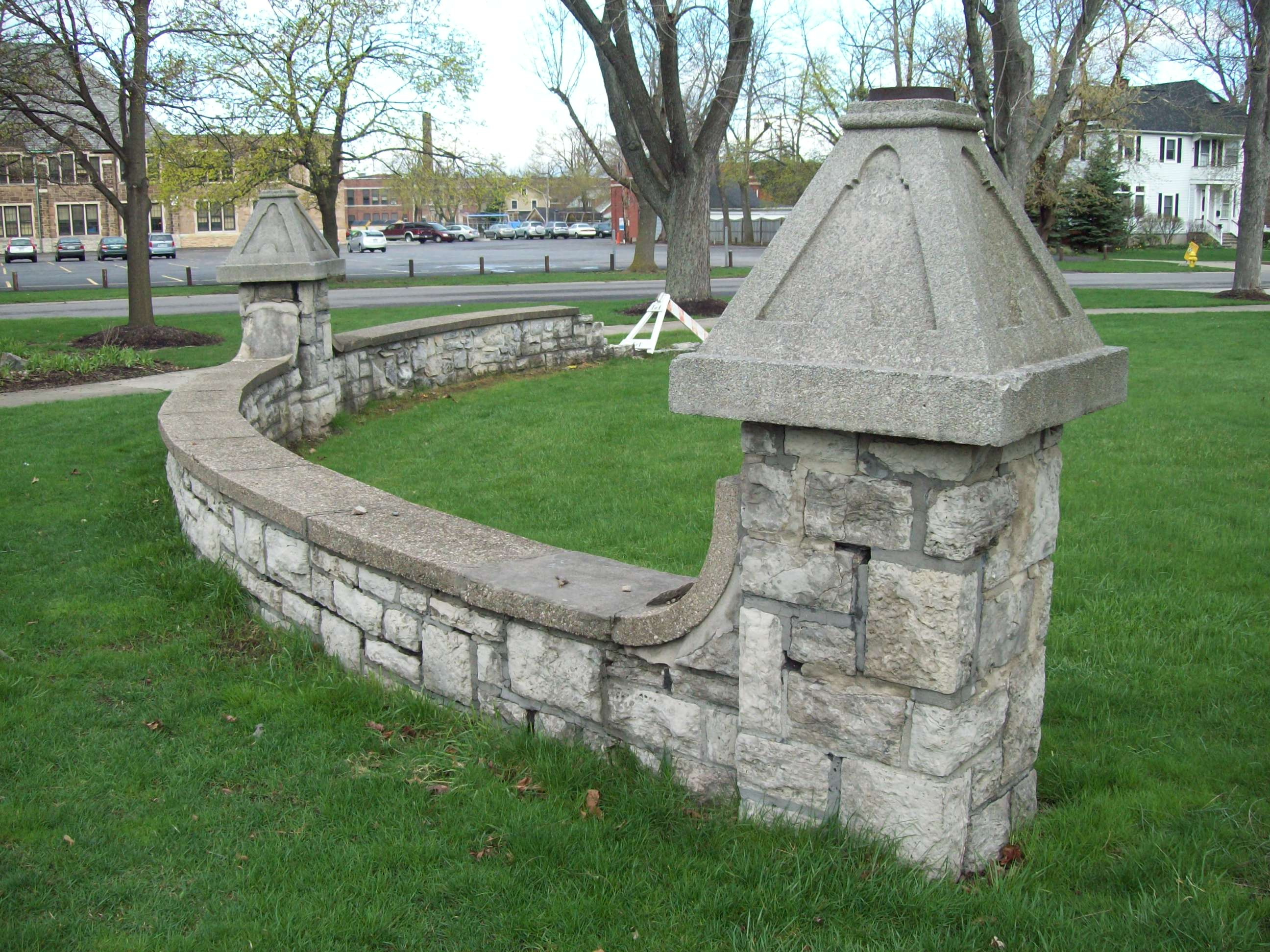
- Entranceway at Main Street at Westfield Road and Ivyhurst Road, April 2010

- Location within New York Location within the United States
- Location: Main St., jct. with Westfield Road and Ivyhurst Road, Amherst, New York
- Coordinates: 42°57′51.57″N 78°47′51.55″W
- Built: 1920
- Architect: Sattler, John; Goode & Sickels, Realtors
- MPS: Suburban Development of Buffalo, New York MPS
- NRHP reference No.: 09000558
- Added to NRHP: July 23, 2009

Entranceway at Main Street at Westfield Road and Ivyhurst Road is a suburban residential subdivision entranceway built about 1920 by John Sattler. It is located on Main Street (New York State Route 5) in the town of Amherst within Erie County. It consists of stone posts, connecting quarter-height stone walls, and accent light fixtures located on either street corner.

It was added to the National Register of Historic Places in 2009.
