= Scott E. Friedman =

American lawyer

- Born: September 17, 1958 (age 68); Williamsville, New York, U.S.
- Education: Trinity College (BA); Washington University in St. Louis (JD); University of Pennsylvania Law School (LLM)
- Occupations: Author; attorney

Scott E. Friedman (born September 17, 1958) is an American attorney, venture capitalist, and author from Buffalo, New York. After graduating from the University of Pennsylvania School of Law, Friedman worked at Montgomery McCracken Walker & Rhodes in Philadelphia before returning to Buffalo. Friedman joined Lippes Mathias LLP (formerly Lippes Mathias Wexler Friedman LLP), where he served as Managing Partner or chairman from 1990 through 2020, at which time he stepped aside to co-lead the Firm's start-up and venture capital practice, as well as its family business practice.

Friedman is also a General Partner in Impact Capital, a venture capital firm based in Upstate New York that he helped launch in 2017 to invest in growing companies in Upstate New York. He also organized Buffalo Capital Partners and is a co-founder of Varia Ventures.

== Early life and education ==
Friedman was born in Williamsville, New York. He got his BA from Trinity College, his J.D. from Washington University in St. Louis, and his LLM from University of Pennsylvania School of Law.

== Career ==
In 2009, he became the Managing Partner of Lippes Mathias Wexler Friedman LLP in Buffalo. His work at the firm involves helping health care businesses operate efficiently and avoid legal tangles.

Friedman has been frequently interviewed as an expert in family business planning. He has also authored several articles on the subject for state and national publications.

Friedman serves on the board of directors of a number of companies, including MimiVax, Inc. In 2014 he organized the investment group Buffalo Capital Partners. In 2016 he became a member of the council for the State University of New York at Buffalo.

In 2019, Friedman co-founded Varia Ventures, a venture capital firm principally focused on partnering with medical and surgical societies to support their innovation platforms through education, assistance in running and judging business plan competitions, and helping to launch and manage proprietary venture capital funds.

== Books and Articles ==
Friedman has written seven books drawing on his work as an attorney. His first book, How to Run a Family Business, was the first of five books Friedman authored focused on advising families on how to better operate their family business. Other books in the series are The Successful Family Business and Family Business and Positive Psychology and "Secrets From the Delphi Cafe: Unlocking the Code to Happiness" with Bob Rich.

He is also the author of numerous articles on business, venture capital, positive psychology, and strategy, including articles that have appeared in Forbes, Success, Delta's Sky Magazine, the Buffalo Law Review, Congress Quarterly (the Journal of the Congress of Neurological Surgeons), MGMA Connection (the Journal of the Medical Group Management Association), and the Journal of Medical Practice Management.

Friedman regularly speaks on business topics, particularly related to investment and startup companies, strategy, and family businesses. He has been invited to lecture across the United States, including at Columbia University's School of Business, the University of Southern California's School of Business, the University at Buffalo's School of Management.

== Honors and awards ==
Friedman has received numerous awards for his professional accomplishments. He has routinely been listed as a Top Attorney in New York, a Super Lawyer, and recipient of Martindale-Hubbell's AV Preeminent Rating for having been recognized by his peers of his legal ability and ethical standards. He has also been named to Who's Who in America.

He is a long time squash player, having played on the Trinity College Varsity team for four years, in later year, winning City of Buffalo singles and doubles squash tournaments.

== Boards and Community Service ==
Friedman has served on numerous private and public school boards of directors over the years. Currently, he is serving a second term as a member of the University at Buffalo Council, having been appointed by Governor Cuomo and then Governor Hochul. He is also member of Daemen University Board of Trustees, where he chairs the Board's Investment Committee. He has also been a member of the WNY Law Enforcement Foundation's Board for over twenty years.
