= Williamsville Christian Church =

Historic church in New York, United States

- U.S. National Register of Historic Places
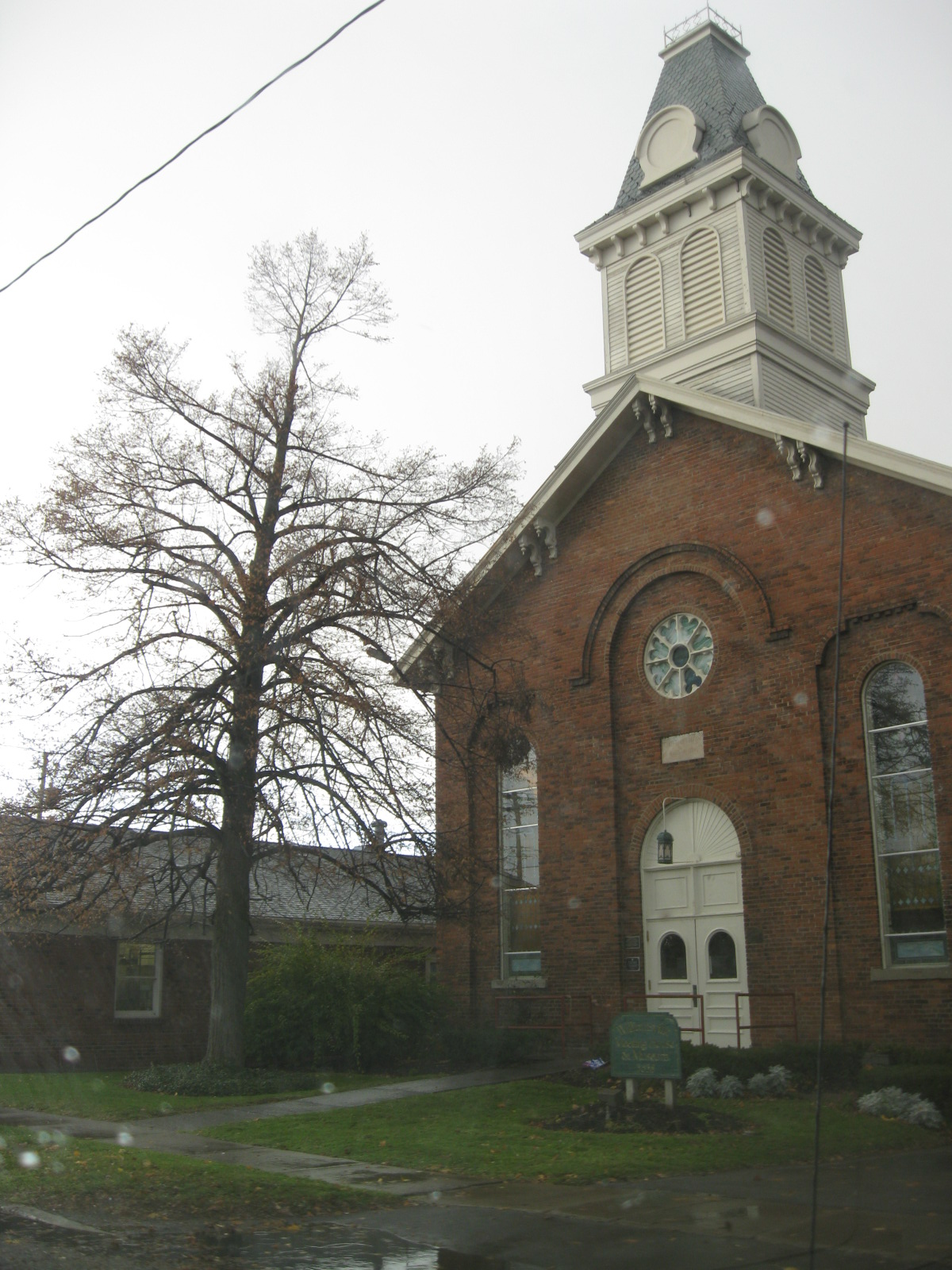
- Williamsville Christian Church, November 2009

- Location within New York Location within the United States
- Location: 5658 Main St., Williamsville, New York
- Coordinates: 42°57′48″N 78°44′33″W
- Built: 1871
- Architectural style: Late Victorian
- NRHP reference No.: 02000546
- Added to NRHP: May 22, 2002

The Williamsville Christian Church, also known as the Meeting House, is a historic Disciples of Christ church located at Williamsville in Erie County, New York. It is a 2 1/2-story brick Italianate-style structure constructed in 1871 and remodeled in about 1900.

Organized some forty years earlier, the evangelical congregation had been meeting in simple quarters nearby. They were a dedicated, community-minded group and are credited with having founded the first secondary school in the area, the Williamsville Classical Institute.

In 1976, following a decline in congregation, the building was turned over to the Village of Williamsville for community use and for preservation.

The Meeting House is sometimes used as a community theater, and has an annual season, usually consisting of a couple plays and a musical.

The Meeting House, named to the National Register of Historic Places, is a well designed structure belonging to the Village's people. This historic building features a rose window facing Main Street. The large rose window and the church's twelve arched and arcaded windows contain three kinds of glass: the original stenciled glass, pebble glass, and newer leaded glass.

It was added to the National Register of Historic Places in 2002.
