= Entranceway at Main Street at LeBrun Road =

- U.S. National Register of Historic Places
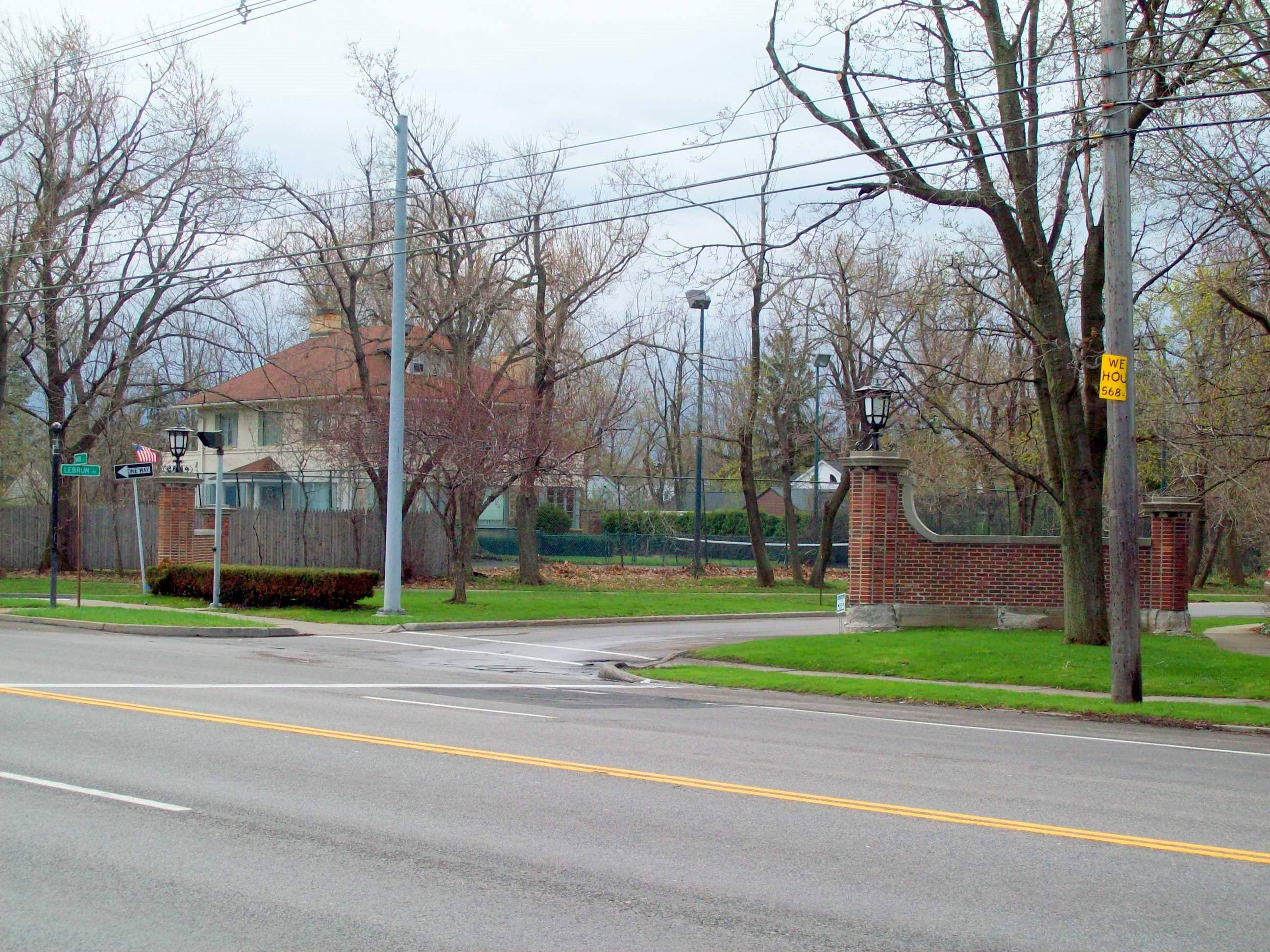
- Entranceway at Main Street at LeBrun Road, April 2010

- Location within New York Location within the United States
- Location: Main St., jct. with LeBrun Road, Amherst, New York
- Coordinates: 42°57′51.57″N 78°47′51.55″W
- Built: 1920
- Architect: Goode & Sickels, Realtors
- MPS: Suburban Development of Buffalo, New York MPS
- NRHP reference No.: 09000557
- Added to NRHP: July 23, 2009

Entranceway at Main Street at LeBrun Road is a suburban residential subdivision entranceway in Amherst, New York, USA. It was built about 1920 by Goode & Sickels, Realtors. It is located on Main Street (New York State Route 5) at Eggertsville in the town of Amherst within Erie County. It consists of half-height brick masonry walls, brick masonry posts, and accent light fixtures located on either street corner.

It was added to the National Register of Historic Places in 2009.
