= Glen Falls (New York) =

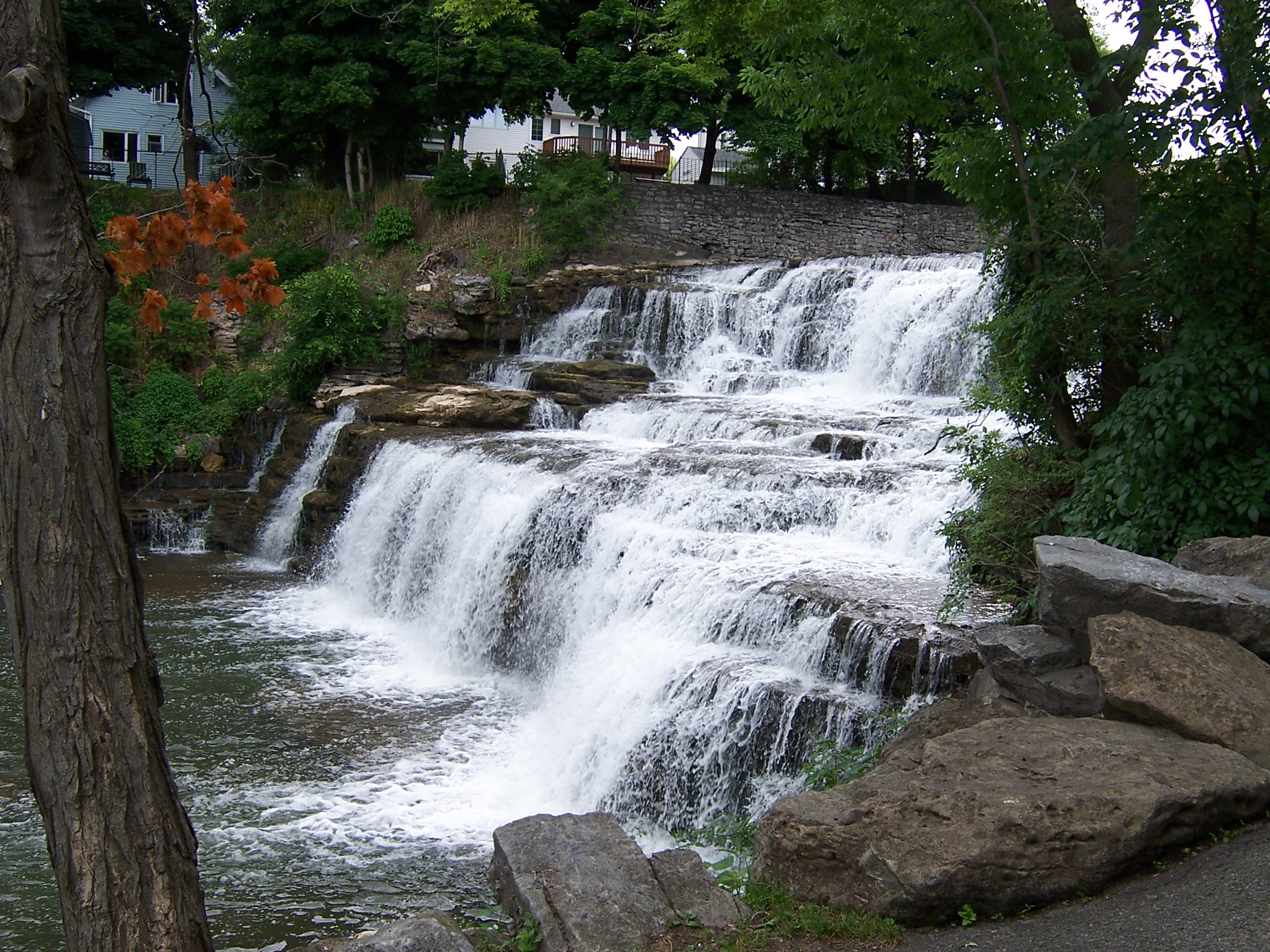
- Interactive map of Glen Falls
- Location: Williamsville, Erie County, NY, U.S.
- Coordinates: 42°57′50″N 78°44′38″W
- Type: Cascade
- Total height: 30 feet (9.1 m)
- Watercourse: Ellicott Creek

Glen Falls is a small waterfall located on Ellicott Creek in the village of Williamsville, New York. The hydropower provided by the falls made it an ideal site for a number of early watermills used to grind grist and to power sawmills.

One of the earliest settlers of what is now Williamsville, Jonas Williams, owned two mills on opposite sides of Ellicott Creek. The name of these mills, Williams Mills, eventually transformed into the name of the village in which the falls is located, Williamsville. The falls has a vertical drop of approximately 30 feet (9.1 m). The vertical drop is part of the Onondaga Escarpment, a portion of which runs through Williamsville. Today, the falls forms part of the eastern border of Glen Park.

Glen Falls has a very similar name to the city of Glens Falls, which is located in the far eastern portion of New York State, over 200 miles (320 km) from Williamsville.

== See also ==
- List of waterfalls
