= Pentecostal Collegiate Institute (New York) =

Coordinates: 43°5′9.8″N 73°46′59.9″W

- Type: Private
- Active: 1900–1903
- Affiliations: Association of Pentecostal Churches of America
- President: Lyman C. Pettit (1900-1903)
- Principal: William F. Albrecht (1900-1901); Lyman C. Pettit (1901-1902); David C. Thatcher (1902-1903)
- Location: Saratoga Springs, New York, United States
- Campus: Urban

The Pentecostal Collegiate Institute (New York) was a short-lived co-educational collegiate institute operated initially by the Association of Pentecostal Churches of America at Saratoga Springs, New York from September 1900 to May 1902, and from then by Lyman C. Pettit until its closure in February 1903. It is considered an antecedent institution of the Pentecostal Collegiate Institute (Rhode Island) and also Eastern Nazarene College.

== Location ==
Initially the Pentecostal Collegiate Institute held its classes and accommodated its students and faculty from September 1900 to September 1901 at the Garden View House, which was located at 534 Broadway Avenue, Saratoga Springs, New York.

From 25 September 1901 PCI was located at the Kenmore Hotel, which had been built in 1880. The three-story building was located at 556 Broadway Avenue (at the corner with Van Dam Street) in Saratoga Springs. It was on the high ground overlooking Congress Park on the main avenue to the lake, and could accommodate 400 guests.

== History ==
=== Pentecostal Collegiate Institute and Bible Training School (1900-1901) ===
Almost immediately after he became a member of the Association of Pentecostal Churches of America (APCA) in 1898, Rev. Lyman C. Pettit, pastor of the Grace Pentecostal Church in Saratoga Springs, New York, began to articulate the need for a school for training preachers, missionaries and evangelists and other Christian workers for the APCA, to the extent that "Pettit was one of the main advocates for starting the Pentecostal Collegiate Institute." Pettit was supported by Rev. John H. Norris, pastor of the APCA church in Pittsburgh, Pennsylvania and moderator of the APCA from 1899; and Rev. Fred A. Hillery, pastor of the People's Pentecostal Church in South Providence, Rhode Island, who each wanted the school to be located near their church. Hiram F. Reynolds, one of the founders of the APCA, was influential in convincing the delegates at the 4th annual meeting of the APCA in April 1899 to create a Committee on Education to "consider the matter of Pentecostal schools; to outline courses of study for training preachers, missionaries, and evangelists; and to deal with such other interests as might come before them." At the same meeting, the APCA elected a standing committee on education with Norris as chairman and Reynolds chosen to be the financial secretary. During the following year this committee recommended both the adoption of a course of study for preachers, and the establishment of Pentecostal schools. These recommendations were adopted at the next annual meeting held at Pettit's church in April 1900. In 1900 Pettit was chosen to be chairman of the education committee, with Reynolds as the financial secretary> Other committee members were: Norris; Rev. Joseph Caldwell Bearse (born 4 October 1869 in South Chatham, Massachusetts; died 2 July 1931 in South Portland, Maine), then pastor of the APCA Church at Malden, Massachusetts; Rev. Charles H. BeVier (born 5 September 1858; died about 1905), then pastor of the John Wesley Pentecostal Church in Brooklyn, New York; and Rev. Henry N. Brown. Pentecostal Collegiate Institute and Bible Training School was established for the purpose of providing liberal education and ministry training in a preparatory academy, four-year college, and theological seminary. The committee elected Pettit as the first president of the new school, but as no salary was provided, Pettit served without any compensation, relying on his income as pastor of the Grace Pentecostal Church.

By the summer of 1900, Pettit had recruited a faculty and the APCA's official periodical, the Beulah Christian announced that the Pentecostal Collegiate Institute would begin operation in September 1900. PCI was accredited by the New York State Education Department's Board of Regents of the University of the State of New York. As there was no other similar state institution in Saratoga Springs at that time, PCI was given state funding in addition to that raised from APCA churches and members. All faculty were required to be in the experience of entire sanctification, and the Bible was to be "the Great Textbook". During the summer of 1900 Pettit was active in recruiting students while speaking at camp meetings from Canada to Pennsylvania. On 25 September 1900 PCI commenced with Rev. William F. Albrecht (born June 1856 in New York), a former Methodist clergyman from the New York Conference, who had previously been principal of Greenville Academy in Greenville, New York for several years, and for two years as a professor at Claverack College, who had joined the APCA about September 1900, chosen to be principal. There was five other teaching staff: Miss Henrietta Moke, a former Brooklyn high school teacher, who was vice-principal; Miss Eva B. Ayers, a former principal of Portland High School in Maine, was Preceptress; William H. Albrecht, son of the principal, taught algebra and geometry.

For the first year, PCI was based in the rented Garden View House, a Summer resort hotel at 536 Broadway Avenue, Saratoga Springs, that had the capacity for seventy-five students. Tuition, room, board, and laundry was only $100, with an increase to $125 the following year. From its inception, PCI was both co-educational and interdenominational. The initial enrolment was 51 students, with 21 from Saratoga Springs, and students from eight different states. The students were enrolled in PCI's high school, and its preparatory department. There were 17 elementary, 12 high school, 11 seminary, and 11 special students. Unlike Bible Colleges of that day, PCI was a post-secondary school collegiate institute and for its first two years had a liberal arts program with "Latin, Greek, modern languages, art, music, and oratory" in its curriculum for ministerial students. PCI specially rejected the use of higher criticism to study the Bible. It was the stated purpose of the founders that "holiness shall be written upon all from headstone to keystone, and shall be Christocentric under the constantly sought and clearly recognized guidance of the Holy Ghost." Additionally, they indicated "both mind and body ruled by a blood washed, fire crowned spirit is the end sought for every student." As a consequence, from its inception, there was a commitment to a balanced educational preparation for ministry, however "tremendous pressure was applied throughout the year to bring every student into a profession of saving and sanctifying grace. Scenes of rather unrestrained emotional fervor were characteristic." By the end of the first school term, "virtually all were converted, and most of them were sanctified wholly".

=== Pentecostal Collegiate Institute and Biblical Seminary (1901-1903) ===
At the 6th annual meeting of the APCA held in April 1901, Pettit was re-elected president of the educational committee, with Bearse elected Secretary, Reynolds elected financial secretary. In addition to Bevier, and Norris, the educational committee also included Reynolds; Rev. Albert B. Riggs, the pastor of the APCA Church at Lowell, Massachusetts; and Hillery, who was elected treasurer. The committee decided not to rehire Albrecht nor the other members of his family because of personality conflicts with Pettit. Pettit was chosen to become principal, while remaining as president of PCI, and continuing to serve as the pastor of the Grace Pentecostal Church. The standing educational committee also recommended that "a building be erected for the Pentecostal College at a cost not to exceed $20,000, provided that $10,000 in good subscriptions could be secured." The school's name was changed to the Pentecostal Collegiate Institute and Biblical Seminary.

During the summer Pettit purchased for $16,500 the Kenmore Hotel, a three-story brick resort hotel capable of accommodating between 150 and 200 students, located at 556 Broadway Avenue (at the corner with Van Dam Street) in Saratoga Springs from Max Marx as the permanent location of PCI. The Committee was only able to make an initial payment of $2,500. As the PCI was unincorporated, the deeds to the three-story brick hotel and its 11,250 square feet (1,045 m^{2}) lot were issued in Pettit's own name rather than in the name of the PCI or the APCA.

At the beginning of its second year of operation on 12 September 1901, Rev. David C. Thatcher (born in July 1858, probably in Rochester, Vermont), a Methodist clergyman of the Vermont Conference, had become PCI's third principal, while Pettit remained President of PCI, as well as chairman of the executive committee. Additionally, eight new faculty members were added, including "Mother" Ella Winslow Perry (born June 1856 in Vermont; died 25 November 1919 in Buldana, India), who was the widow of Rev. Nathan F. Perry (born about 1840 in Canada; died of heart failure in 1884 at St. Albans, Vermont) (a Methodist pastor who had pastored in Vermont), who served as matron, and later as dean of women, general housekeeper, and practical nurse; her son, Ernest Winslow Perry (born in 1876 in Brattleboro, Vermont; died 22 November 1902 in North Scituate, Rhode Island), an 1898 graduate of Boston University, who had been a teacher in Pembroke, Massachusetts, who taught Greek, German, science and mathematics; and her daughter, Gertrude L. Perry (born August 1879 in Springfield, Vermont), who had attended the University of Vermont, but later taught English, French, and music, while studying at PCI. The enrollment had increased to 78 students, with "Thirty-three enrolled in the college preparatory course, nineteen in the Biblical seminary, and twenty-six in other departments." By October 1901 there was "nearly a hundred people" enrolled, with twenty-five kneeling at the altar "seeking either pardon or purity". According to ENC historian James R. Cameron, while education was of a high quality, "[a]t P.C.I. Christian had clear priority over education in Christian education" and "scenes of unrestrained emotional fervor were characteristic of the school." As some locals believed PCI was run by religious fanatics, in October 1901 a petition was circulated in Saratoga Springs that attempted to close PCI, and there were efforts to have Pettit arrested, however PCI was supported by the neighbors, the state senator, and other influential townspeople. Despite the growth in enrolment and Pettit continuing to serve without remuneration, finances were challenging as only six of the 30 APCA congregations provided any financial support. At the end of its second year of operation, nine men finished their Bible School training and entered the pastoral ministry.

At the 7th annual meeting of the APCA held in April 1902, Pettit reported that "the number of faculty members had increased to fourteen and the enrollment had nearly doubled. The school building, including furnishings throughout, had been purchased at a cost of $16,500." Further, Pettit indicated that for his administration the purpose of PCI was that "the school might be not only a holiness college but a holy college striving to spread scriptural holiness throughout the world." Due to conflicts with Pettit over unauthorised expenditures and unfunded debt levels, the educational committee of the APCA decided to increase its control over PCI and its president, to insist upon more financial accountability, to incorporate PCI with its own board of trustees, to sell the property of the school "as soon as sale could be effected advantageously", and to secure property in the name of the APCA. The APCA annual meeting adopted all of the Committee's recommendations.

Pettit, who believed that the school and its leaders should be accountable only to God, and that "human machinery" was contrary to holiness and cumbersome in the administration of PCI, had increasingly come to believe that PCI should be independent, returned to Saratoga Springs and soon announced that he would continue to run PCI in its present location and that it would no longer be under the control of the APCA or its educational committee. Pettit resigned from the APCA and as pastor of the Grace Pentecostal Church effective 1 May 1902. The majority of both the faculty and students supported Pettit.

The educational committee decided to disassociate itself from PCI and Pettit, and responded by announcing that "it had been thought best, all things considered, to sever all connections with the Pentecostal Collegiate Institute, at Saratoga Springs, New York, under its present management." According to official Nazarene historian Timothy L. Smith:

Pettit's zeal outran the limits of financial wisdom, and his personal life fell far short of the heights which he proclaimed in his sermon oratory. A new building, purchased in the summer of 1901 for $16,500, remained heavily in debt. Bills for improvements and operating expenses were secured by a second mortgage of dubious legality. The property turned out at last to have been deeded entirely to Pettit. These facts did not become clear, however, until May 1902, when H. Brown visited Saratoga to investigate rumors of fanaticism and questionable moral conduct on the part of the leaders of the school. Brown found the rumors amply confirmed.

As it was not the legal owner of the assets of PCI, the Committee decided to abjure any responsibility for its debts and to open a new school in a different location, ultimately deciding to relocate to North Scituate, Rhode Island. After Pettit withdrew from the APCA, he continued to operate the school himself. Despite few of the faculty or students deciding to transfer their allegiance or enrolment to the new school, Pettit was unable to meet the mortgage commitments, and PCI closed in February 1903. Pettit filed for bankruptcy on 29 August 1903 with debts of $26,483 and assets of $22,124, and was declared bankrupt by 1904. Rev. William Howard Hoople, one of the founders of the APCA, who had been elected superintendent of home missions for APCA in April 1904, argued that the APCA should assume certain debts of PCI in Saratoga. When the APCA refused to accept responsibility for some of the Saratoga debts, Hoople resigned as superintendent of home missions, but remained within the denomination.

== See also ==
- List of defunct colleges and universities in New York
