= St. Mary of the Angels Motherhouse Complex (Amherst, New York) =

- U.S. National Register of Historic Places
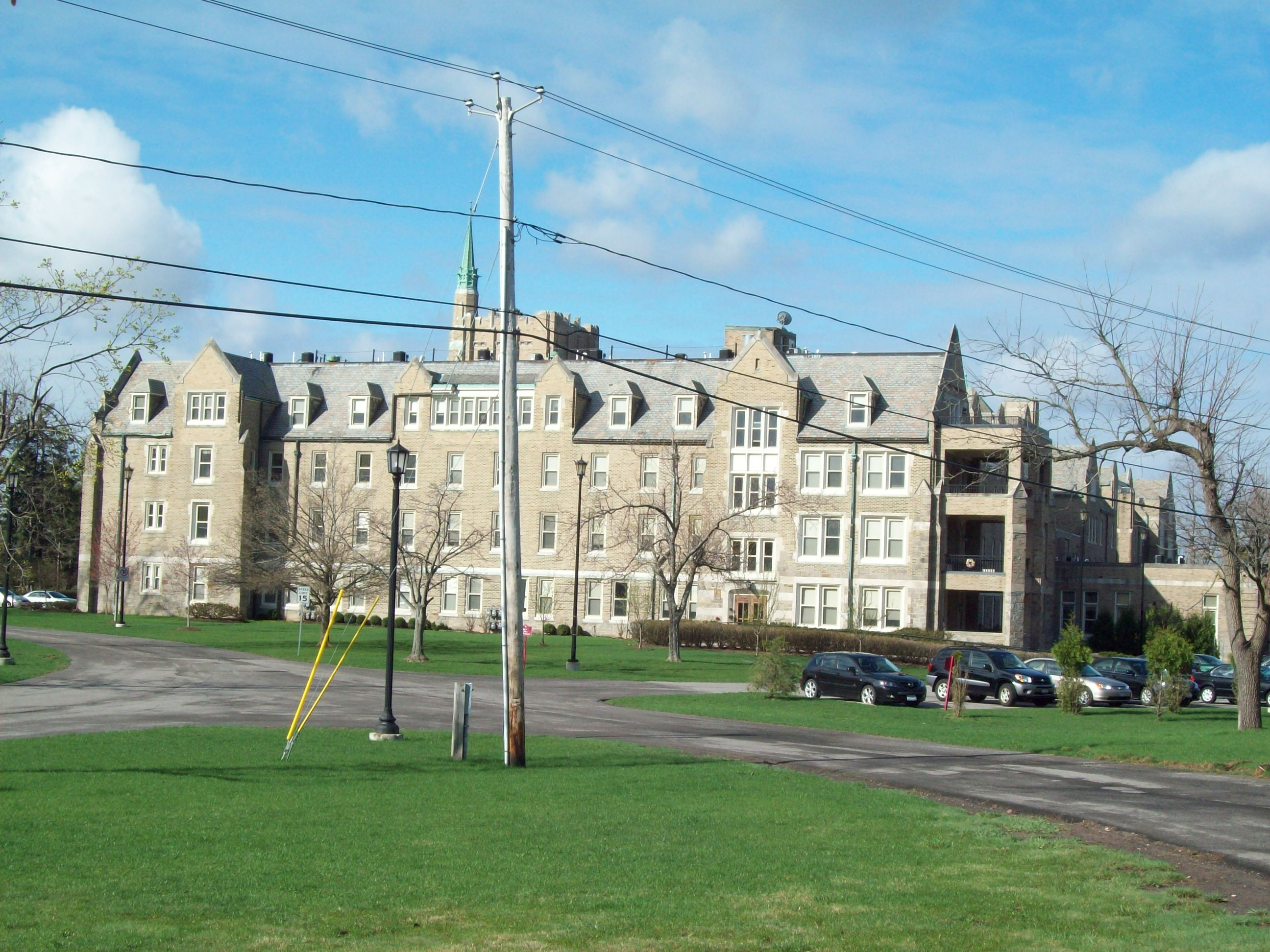
- St. Mary of the Angels Motherhouse Complex, April 2010

- Location within New York Location within the United States
- Interactive map showing the location for St. Mary of the Angels Motherhouse Complex
- Nearest city: Amherst, New York
- Coordinates: 42°58′19″N 78°44′52″W
- Built: 1928
- Architect: Dietel and Wade
- Architectural style: Gothic
- NRHP reference No.: 02001046
- Added to NRHP: October 24, 2002

St. Mary of the Angels Motherhouse Complex is a historic Roman Catholic convent located in the Town of Amherst in Erie County, New York. It was designed in 1928 by Dietel and Wade, who also designed Buffalo City Hall, as an expansion of the Amherst headquarters of the Sisters of St. Francis. It served the sisters until 1998, when the property was transferred to the State of New York and Town of Amherst for public park use. In 2004, the structure opened as a senior housing facility.

It was listed on the National Register of Historic Places in 2002.
