= Ellicott Creek =

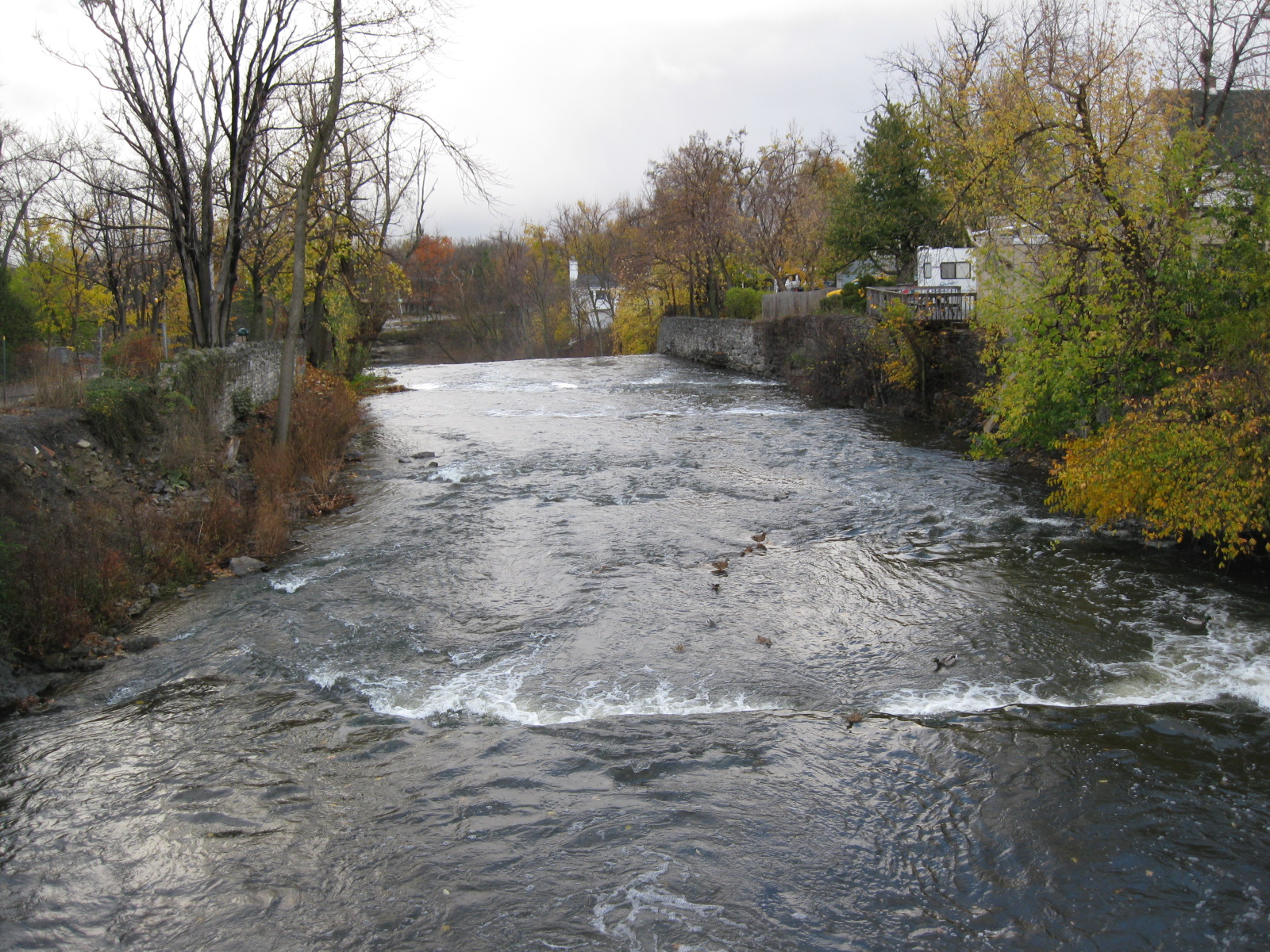
- Ellicott Creek in Williamsville, New York.

- Location of the mouth of Ellicott Creek in New York
- Etymology: Named for Joseph Ellicott, surveyor and land agent.

Location
- Country: United States
- State: New York
- County: Genesee County, Erie County
- City: Tonawanda

Physical characteristics
- Source
  - location: Genesee County
  - coordinates: 42°54′15″N 78°23′49″W
  - elevation: 1,000 ft (300 m)
- Mouth: Tonawanda Creek
  - location: Erie County
  - coordinates: 43°1′16″N 78°52′37″W
  - elevation: 562 ft (171 m)
- Length: 45 mi (72 km)
- Discharge
  - average: 100 cu ft/s (2.8 m^{3}/s)

Ellicott Creek is a stream in Western New York, United States. It is a tributary of Tonawanda Creek, which in turn flows into the Niagara River.

== Course ==
Ellicott Creek originates in southwest corner of Genesee County, just northeast of Darien Lakes State Park, in the Town of Darien. It flows generally west, crossing into Erie County and the Town of Alden. It crosses the northern edge of the Town of Lancaster, flowing through the community of Bowmansville in the northwest part of Lancaster.

Continuing west, Ellicott Creek enters the Town of Cheektowaga. There it passes by the toxic Pfohl Brothers Landfill and the Buffalo Niagara International Airport. The creek turns to the northwest at the airport. It flows under one of the runways via a tunnel. It then turns more directly north and enters the Village of Williamsville and the Town of Amherst.

At Williamsville's Island Park Ellicott Creek splits briefly into two channels, one of which contains floodgates. The other channel was historically used to divert water into flumes for powering mills just downstream. Below the floodgates the creek flows rapidly north, passing under State Route 5 and falling over the Onondaga Escarpment at Glen Falls in Amherst State Park.

After Glen Falls, Ellicott Creek continues flowing generally north and northwest through Amherst. It passes by several golf courses and then through the northern edge of the campus of the University at Buffalo, after which the creek turns to the west and crosses under Interstate 990 (Lockport Expressway).

Just west of I-990 the creek splits into two channels for about 1.25 miles (2.01 km). The northern channel is deeper, has been more thoroughly channelized and is bordered by commercial land use, while the southern channel is fairly sinuous and contains more trees in the riparian zone.

After these channels rejoin, Ellicott Creek it enters the Town of Tonawanda and passes through Ellicott Creek Park. Ellicott Creek continues west for approximately 3 miles (4.8 km) before emptying into Tonawanda Creek in the City of Tonawanda. This portion of Tonawanda Creek is also part of the Erie Canal. Tonawanda Creek then empties into the Niagara River. The distance from the mouth of Ellicott Creek to the Niagara River is about 0.5 miles (0.80 km).

== History ==
Ellicott Creek is named after Joseph Ellicott, an important agent of the Holland Land Company. Ellicott played a significant role in opening Western New York up for settlement after the Iroquois ceded their claims in the 1780s, more significantly in the Big Tree Treaty with the Seneca nation. Elicott surveyed most of Holland Purchase into townships and saleable land parcels.

== Natural history ==
Niagara River surface fluctuations influence creek water level up to 7 miles (11 km) upstream of the mouth of Ellicott Creek.

== Ellicott Creek Bike Path ==
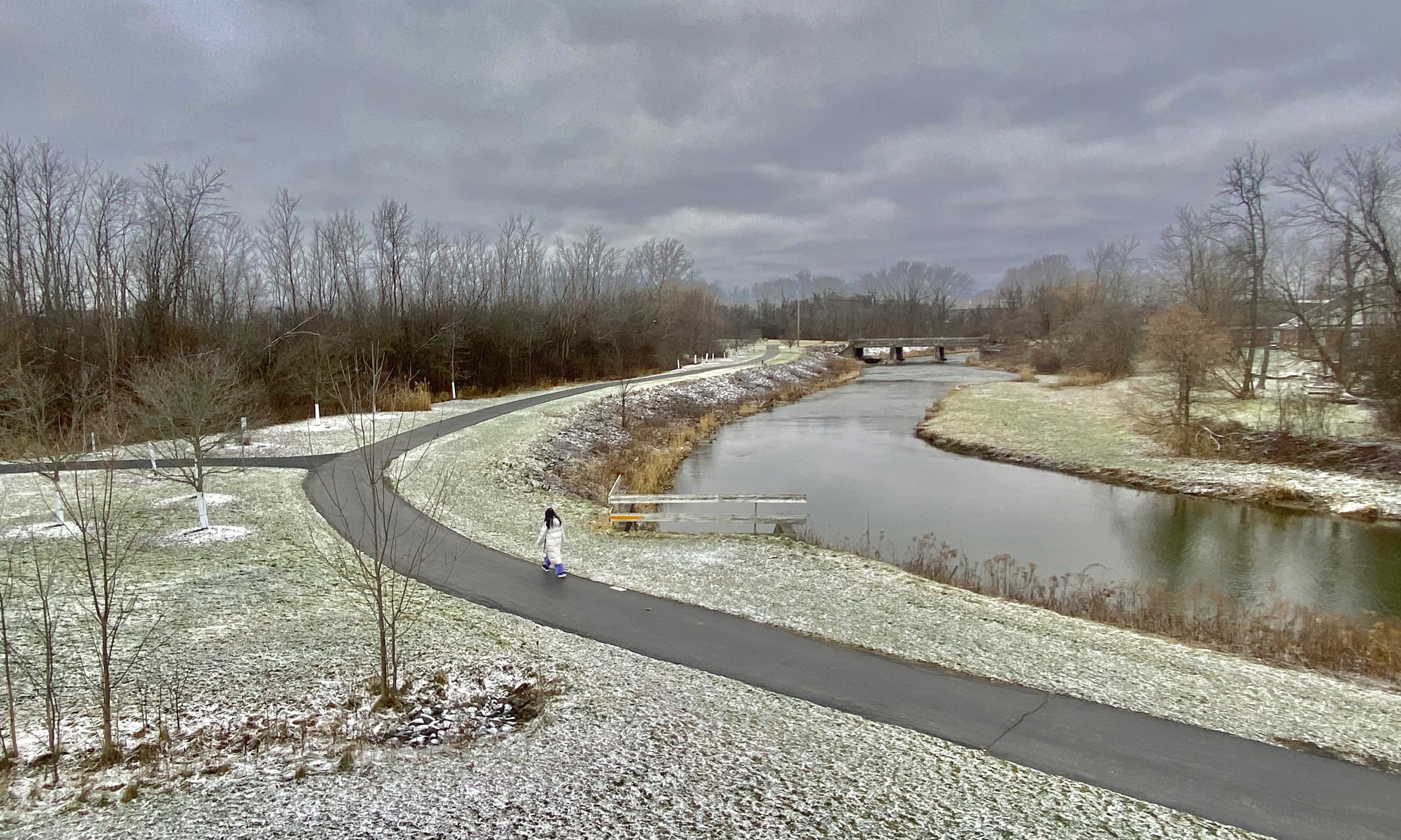
Ellicott Creek Bike Path

Ellicott Creek Bike Path follows the creek in the Town of Amherst, near the University at Buffalo (UB) and flows under Interstate 990 before leaving Amherst by crossing U.S. Route 62 (Niagara Falls Boulevard) to enter the Town of Tonawanda at Ellicott Creek Park.

In 1990, the Ellicott Creek Bike Path was the last known location where Linda Yalem—a UB sophomore running on the path—was alive before being raped and killed by Altemio Sanchez.

== See also ==
- List of New York rivers
