= Williamsville, New York =

- Village
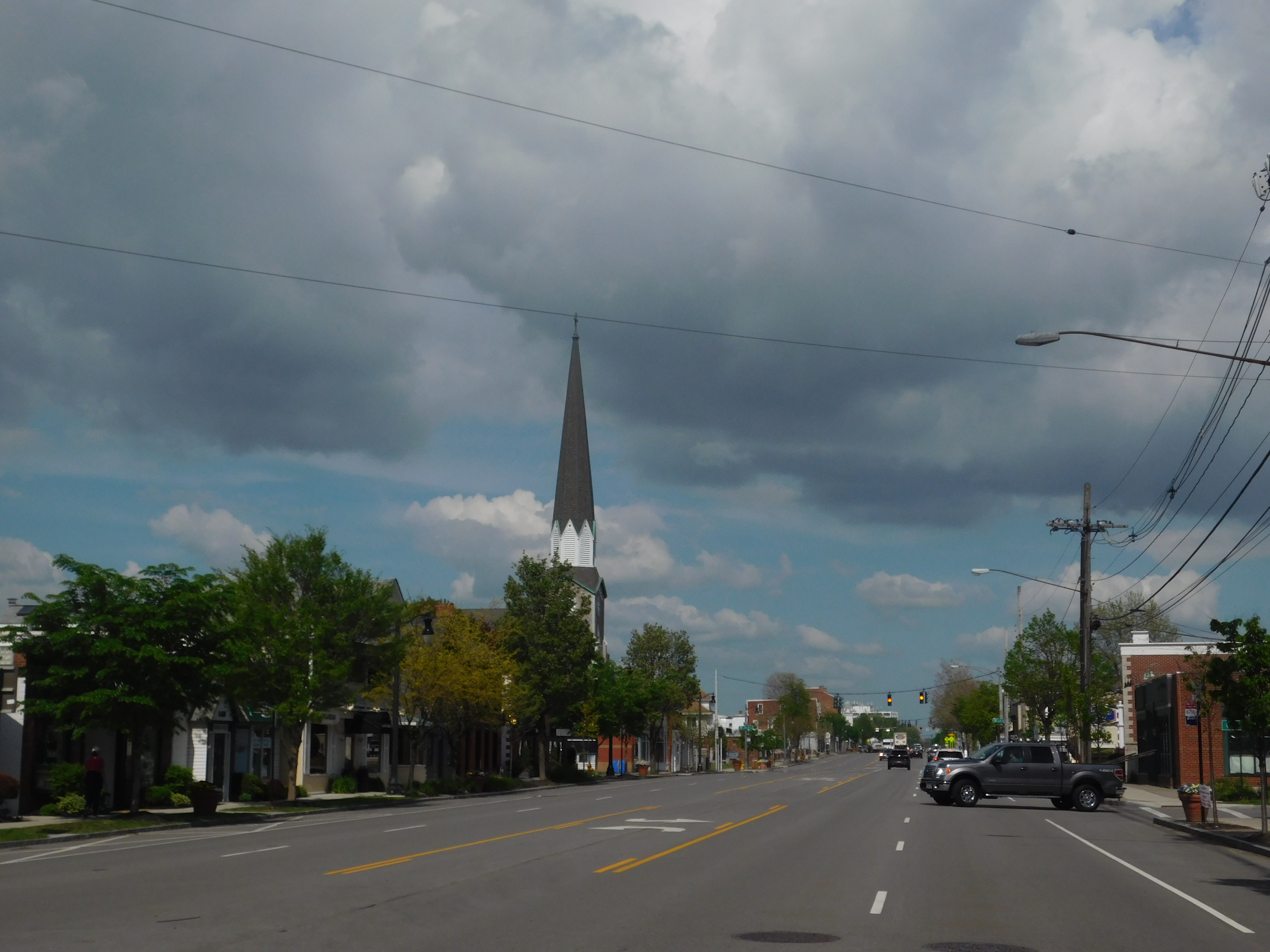
- Downtown Williamsville along NY 5

- Flag Seal

- Location in Erie County and New York
- Coordinates: 42°57′45″N 78°44′33″W
- Country: United States
- State: New York
- County: Erie
- Town: Amherst
- Incorporated: 1850
- Named for: Jonas Williams

Government
  - Mayor: Christine L. Hunt

Area
  - Total: 1.27 sq mi (3.28 km^{2})
  - Land: 1.26 sq mi (3.26 km^{2})
  - Water: 0.0077 sq mi (0.02 km^{2})
- Elevation: 676 ft (206 m)

Population (2020)
  - Total: 5,423
  - Density: 4,310.9/sq mi (1,664.45/km^{2})
- Time zone: UTC-5 (Eastern (EST))
  - Summer (DST): UTC-4 (EDT)
- ZIP codes: 14221, 14231
- Area code: 716
- FIPS code: 36-82084
- GNIS feature ID: 0971319
- Website: williamsvilleny.gov

Williamsville is a village in Erie County, New York, United States. The population was 5,423 at the 2020 census. The village is named after Jonas Williams, an early settler. It is part of the Buffalo-Niagara Falls metropolitan area.

Williamsville is located mostly within the town of Amherst, but Creek Road and Creek Heights in the south part of the village (near the Wehrle Drive underpass of the New York State Thruway) are in the town of Cheektowaga. The village is in the northwestern quadrant of Erie County.

The Williamsville Central School District is a school system covering Williamsville, most of the eastern part of Amherst, and a small portion of the western end of Clarence.

== History ==
The community developed where the major road between Batavia and Buffalo crossed Ellicott Creek just above Glen Falls. The water power offered by the waterfall attracted millers. The first mill was built by Jonas Williams in 1811, giving the village its first name, "Williams Mills". It still stands today, next to Glen Park, and is known as the Williamsville Water Mill.

Several other mills were built near Glen Falls during the 19th century. In 1841, a raceway was constructed to divert water from Ellicott Creek to the mills, creating an island known today as Island Park. A stagecoach stop, tavern, and inn was built along the main road near Ellicott Creek by Oziel Smith in 1827. Today it is known as the Eagle House. The close crossing of the main road and Ellicott Creek's Glen Falls was the initial attraction, around which Williamsville grew. The village was incorporated in 1850.

Ss. Peter and Paul Church was loosely operating in the early 1820s, and the current church construction began in 1834 following the sale of land for the church from a non-parishioner, Oziel Smith, and was finished in 1836. St. John Neumann arrived to lead Ss. Peter and Paul Catholic Church from 1836 to 1840. Ss. Peter and Paul School was started by St. John Neumann in 1836, who also served as one of its first teachers.

During the War of 1812, American troops were stationed in Williamsville in the area between Garrison Road and Ellicott Creek. American soldiers and British prisoners were treated in a field hospital and log barracks that lined Garrison Road. A small cemetery, located on Aero Drive between Wehrle and Youngs Road, was used to bury the men who did not survive. General Winfield Scott used the Evans House as his headquarters in the Spring of 1813 when his entire army of 5,000–6,000 men were stationed in Williamsville. In 1813, when the British burned Buffalo, people fled to the safety of Williamsville, nearby Harris Hill, and Erie, Pennsylvania.

The village of Williamsville was one of more than 550 villages incorporated by New York State in 1850.

In 1983, Williamsville passed a Historic Preservation Code "to promote the awareness of landmarks of historic, cultural, social and architectural significance in the Village of Williamsville and to safe guard the heritage, character and quality of life unique to the Village through the preservation of these landmarks."

Every summer in Williamsville, Old Home Days is held in Island Park, located directly on Main Street in the village. The Carnival begins with a parade on the opening Tuesday, and for four days, thousands of people enjoy rides, food, and the people of Williamsville. The Old Home Days festival is in remembrance of several women who in the mid-19th century came to the park once each summer to drink tea and catch up on the years past.

In 2010, government downsizing activist Kevin Gaughan campaigned to dissolve the village government. After a highly contentious campaign, a dissolution referendum was held on August 17, 2010, where voters rejected dissolution by a 5–1 margin.

== Geography ==
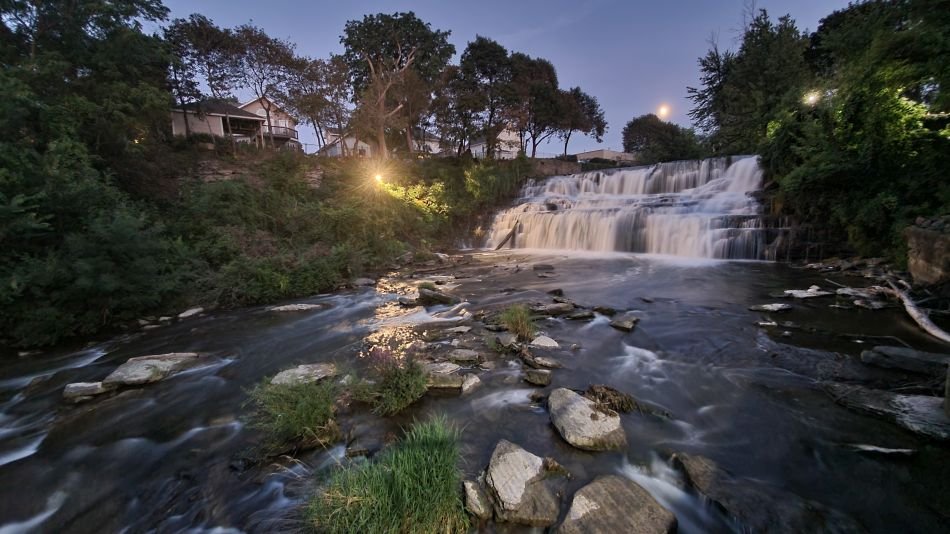
Glen Falls on Ellicott Creek in Williamsville

According to the United States Census Bureau, the village has a total area of 1.2 square miles (3.1 km^{2}), all land.

Ellicott Creek flows through the village from south to north. The Onondaga Escarpment runs through the village east to west. Glen Falls marks the place where Ellicott Creek falls over the escarpment. An early name for Ellicott Creek was "Eleven Mile Creek".

Main Street is part of the east–west New York State Route 5 (NY 5). American surveyor Joseph Ellicott had the "Great Iroquois Trail", an ancient path from the Hudson River to Lake Erie, improved. It was known as the "Buffalo Road" and, later, "Main Street". North Union Road, part of NY 277, is a major north–south road through the west end of the village. Transit Road, surveyed by Joseph Ellicott, was named for an important surveying instrument (a transit level). Transit Road marks the boundary between townships (Amherst and Clarence, Cheektowaga and Lancaster), inter alia. Joseph Ellicott's surveys of western New York divided the Holland Purchase land into a grid of more or less square of townships with boundaries aligned north–south and east–west, a system related to the Public Land Survey System (PLSS) used in most of the rest of post-colonial America. In western New York, strict accordance to the PLSS was not required or followed, since the land was not federally owned, but had passed directly from the Seneca Indians to land speculators such as the Holland Land Company.

The New York State Thruway (Interstate 90 or I-90) passes through the south part of the village and connects to I-290. A Thruway toll plaza located near the village has been a matter of controversy for years and recent proposals suggest it may be moved farther east.

== Demographics ==
Historical population
Census	Pop.	Note	%±
1870	912		—
1880	880		−3.5%
1900	905		—
1910	1,105		22.1%
1920	1,667		50.9%
1930	3,119		87.1%
1940	3,614		15.9%
1950	4,649		28.6%
1960	6,316		35.9%
1970	6,878		8.9%
1980	6,017		−12.5%
1990	5,583		−7.2%
2000	5,573		−0.2%
2010	5,300		−4.9%
2020	5,423		2.3%
U.S. Decennial Census

As of the 2020 US Census there were 5,423 people, 2,364 households, 1,308 families residing in the village, 594 with own children under 18 years. The population density was 4,283.6 people/mi^{2} (1,653.9 /km^{2}). The racial makeup of the village was 86.4% White, 4.6% Asian, 3.6% African American, 0.13% Native American, 0.83% of other races, and 4.7% of two or more races. Hispanic or Latino of any race were 2.7% of the population.

There were 2,364 households, out of which 27.2% had children under the age of 18 living with them, 9.9% had a female householder with no husband present, and 44.7% were non-families. 37.3% of all households were made up of individuals, and 22.4% had someone living alone who was 65 years of age or older. The average household size was 2.11 and the average family size was 2.83.

In the village, the population was spread out, with 18.7% under the age of 19, 6.0% from 20 to 24, 23.2% from 25 to 44, 23.5% from 45 to 64, and 24.4% who were 65 years of age or older, with a median age of 45. The population was 47.3% male and 52.7% female.

According to the 2000 US Census, there were 2,695 housing units at an average density of 2,107.0 per square mile (813.5/km^{2}). The median income for a household in the village was $47,557, and the median income for a family was $65,300. Males had a median income of $43,500 versus $32,172 for females. The per capita income for the village was $27,177. About 2.5% of families and 4.5% of the population were below the poverty line, including 2.7% of those under age 18 and 4.7% of those age 65 or over.

In 2007 it was found that the violent crimes per 1,000 residents were measured at 1.13, where as the national median was 4.0, property crimes (per 1000) were at 16.98, the national average was 29.4, and crimes per square mile were at 13, the national average was at 39.3.

== Arts and culture ==
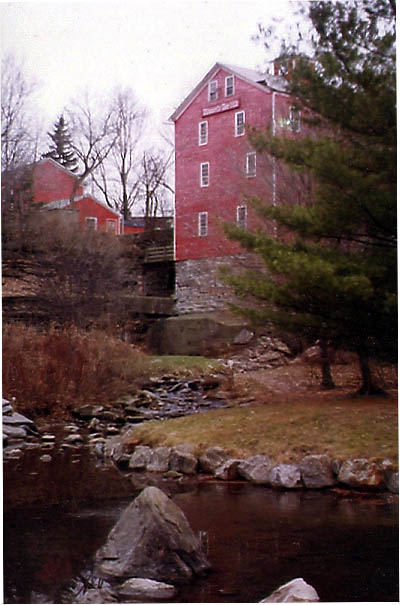
Williamsville Water Mill

=== Landmarks ===
Williamsville has several parks. Glen Park, 10 acres (4.0 ha) (the site of an amusement park in the 1940s and 1950s), offers views of Ellicott Creek as it falls over the Onondaga Escarpment, forming the 27-foot-high (8.2 m) Glen Falls; Island Park has a large pavilion and is the site of Old Home Days and the Taste of Williamsville events during the summer.

There are 34 sites in Williamsville designated as landmarks by the village's Historic Preservation Commission The Williamsville Christian Church and the Williamsville Water Mill Complex are listed on the National Register of Historic Places.

=== Festival ===
The main festival in Williamsville is Old Home Days and there also is the Taste of Williamsville. During the summer there is Music on Main, a musical festival hosted by several businesses on Main Street where local bands play on street corners during various days.

== Parks and recreation ==
Recreational facilities in town include a rollerskating rink and the 1.5-mile (2.4 km) Lehigh Memory Trail.

== Education ==
Children of school age may attend public schools within the Williamsville Central School District, whose boundaries cover the entire village as well as much of the adjacent unincorporated Town of Amherst and parts of other towns.

Williamsville Central operates six elementary (grades K-4), four middle (5-8), and three high (9-12) schools. Of those, Village of Williamsville children are districted to Forest Elementary, Mill Middle, and Williamsville South High School.

The private schools of Williamsville include Saints Peter and Paul (Roman Catholic Diocese of Buffalo), as well as Christian Central Academy.

== Notable people ==
- Marty Angelo, minister and author
- Jacob Artist, actor on FOX's Glee
- Justin Bailey, player in the NHL
- Alfred F. Beiter (1894–1974), former US congressman
- Charles F. Bishop (1844–1913), former mayor of Buffalo, New York
- Roy Turnbull Black (1888–1962), chess player
- Shirley Chisholm, Congresswoman, following her retirement from Congress
- W. H. Clatworthy (1915–2010), University at Buffalo professor, World War II veteran
- Thomas Dao (1921–2009), physician who developed breast cancer treatment alternatives
- Jim Dombrowski, former pro football player
- Benjamin Ellicott (1765–1827), former US congressman
- Jeff Farkas, former NHL player
- Sameera Fazili, deputy director of National Economic Council in the Biden Administration
- Paul Fix II, racecar driver
- Shelby Fix, media personality
- Charles V. Fornes (1844–1929), former US congressman
- Scott E. Friedman, author and attorney
- David Goggins, Navy SEAL and author
- Glenn Gronkowski, former American football player
- Rob Gronkowski, former American football player for the New England Patriots and the Tampa Bay Buccaneers
- Robert Guthrie (1916–1995), developed the bacterial inhibition assay used to screen infants for phenylketonuria at birth
- Nelson K. Hopkins (1816–1904), lawyer and politician
- Robert Kinkel, Trans-Siberian Orchestra composer and keyboardist
- David Leggio, minor league hockey player
- Dan Macaulay, singer, songwriter
- Joe Mack, MLB catcher, born in Williamsville
- Wendie Malick, American actor
- Todd Marchant, retired professional ice hockey player
- Kendell McFayden, professional soccer player
- John Neumann (1811–1860), canonized Roman Catholic priest and bishop who was the founder and first pastor of SS Peter and Paul Catholic Church in Williamsville
- Lyman C. Pettit (1868–1950), founder and first president of the Pentecostal Collegiate Institute (now Eastern Nazarene College)
- Andrew Poturalski, professional hockey player
- Mary Lou Rath, former New York state senator
- Mario J. Rossetti (1935–2014), New York Supreme Court justice
- Alex Sahlen, professional soccer player
- Peter Salovey, twenty-third President of Yale University
- Hayley Scamurra, ice hockey player for the PWHL, 2022 Beijing Olympics silver medalist
- Peter Scamurra, retired NHL player
- Cole Schneider, ice hockey player
- John B. Sheffer II, former village mayor, New York assemblyman and state senator
- Lindsay Shookus, NBC producer
- Faith Whittlesey (1939–2018), former White House senior staff member
