= List of heritage registers =

This list is of heritage registers, inventories of cultural properties, natural and human-made, tangible and intangible, movable and immovable, that are deemed to be of sufficient heritage value to be separately identified and recorded. In many instances the pages linked below have as their primary focus the registered assets rather than the registers themselves. Where a particular article or set of articles on a foreign-language Wikipedia provides fuller coverage, a link is provided.

== International ==
United Nations

- World Heritage Sites (see Lists of World Heritage Sites) – UNESCO, advised by the International Council on Monuments and Sites
- Representative list of the Intangible Cultural Heritage of Humanity (UNESCO)
- Memory of the World Programme (UNESCO)
- Globally Important Agricultural Heritage Systems (GIAHS) – Food and Agriculture Organization
- UNESCO Biosphere Reserve

Europe

- European Heritage Label (EHL) are European sites which are considered milestones in the creation of Europe. At the end of 2019 there are 48 sites designed with the European Heritage Label

Antarctica

- Historic Sites and Monuments in Antarctica protected under the Antarctic Treaty System

Organization of Turkic States

- Turkic Culture and Heritage Foundation

Arab League

- Arab League Educational, Cultural and Scientific Organization

Caribbean Community

- Caribbean Heritage Organization

== Afghanistan ==
Afghanistan: Society for the Preservation of Afghan Cultural Heritage

== Albania ==
Albania: List of Religious Cultural Monuments of Albania

- National Centre of Cultural Property Inventory

== Algeria ==
Algeria: List of cultural assets of Algeria

== Andorra ==
Andorra: Bé d'interès cultural, as maintained by Patrimoni Cultural = Cultural Heritage of Andorra; (in Catalan) Llista de monuments d'Andorra

== Angola ==
Angola: Património Histórico-Cultural Nacional

== Antigua and Barbuda ==
Antigua and Barbuda: National Cultural Heritage of Antigua and Barbuda

== Argentina ==
Argentina: National Historic Monuments of Argentina; (in French) Monument historique national (Argentine)

== Armenia ==
Armenia: State Heritage of National Register (Armenia)

== Australia ==
Australia: Heritage registers in Australia

=== Statutory registers ===
Federal registers

- Australian National Heritage List
- Commonwealth National Heritage List
- Overseas places of historic significance to Australia

State and territory registers

- Australian Capital Territory Heritage Register
- New South Wales State Heritage Register
- Northern Territory Heritage Register
- Queensland Heritage Register
- South Australian Heritage Register
- Tasmanian Heritage Register
- Victorian Heritage Register
- Western Australia State Register of Heritage Places

=== Non-statutory registers ===
Federal registers

- National Trust of Australia
- Register of the National Estate (defunct register)

State and territory registers

- National Trust of Queensland
- National Trust of Australia (Victoria)
- National Trust of Western Australia

Local government registers

- Most Australian local government authorities also maintain registers

=== Online databases ===
All statutory and non-statutory federal registers

- The National Heritage Database is a searchable database which includes:
  - places in the World Heritage List
  - places in the Australian National Heritage List
  - places in the Commonwealth National Heritage list
  - places in the Register of the National Estate (non-statutory defunct register archive)
  - places in the List of Overseas Places of Historic Significance to Australia
  - places under consideration, or that may have been considered for, any one of these lists.

All other statutory and non-statutory state, local government, and various other registers and inventories

- New South Wales Heritage Database
- Victorian Heritage Database
  - Victorian Heritage Inventory
  - Victorian War Heritage Inventory

== Austria ==
Austria: Denkmalgeschütztes Objekt, as maintained by the Bundesdenkmalamt

== Azerbaijan ==
Azerbaijan: State Register of Intangible Cultural Heritage Samples of Azerbaijan

- List of monuments of Azerbaijan

== Bahamas ==
Bahamas: Bahamas National Trust

== Bahrain ==
Bahrain: Bahrain Authority for Culture and Antiquities

== Bangladesh ==
Bangladesh: Cultural Heritage of Bangladesh and National Heritage Foundation of Bangladesh

== Barbados ==
Barbados: Barbados National Trust

== Belarus ==
Belarus: Cultural Properties of Belarus

== Belgium ==
Belgium: National Heritage Site (Belgium); (in Dutch) Lijsten van cultureel erfgoed

== Benin ==
Benin: (in French) Liste du patrimoine mondial au Bénin

== Bhutan ==
- Bhutan: Bhutan Foundation

== Bolivia ==
Bolivia: Bolivian cultural heritage

== Bosnia and Herzegovina ==
Bosnia: List of National Monuments of Bosnia and Herzegovina, as maintained by the KONS of Bosnia and Herzegovina;

State level

- Commission to preserve national monuments of Bosnia and Herzegovina (KONS)
- Central Register of Monuments (CES)

Local level (entities, district Brčko, cantonal, and regional)

- Institute for the Protection of Monuments of the Federation of Bosnia and Herzegovina [Zavod za zaštitu spomenika Federacija Bosne i Hercegovine]
- Republic Institute for Protection of Cultural and Natural Heritage of Republic of Srpska [Republic Institute for Protection of Cultural and Natural Heritage of Republic of Srpska]
- Institute for the Protection of Monuments District Brčko [Zavod za zaštitu spomenika District Brčko] (Služba za turizam Vlade Brčko distrikta Bosne i Hercegovine)
- Cantonal Institute for the Protection of Cultural–Historical and Natural Heritage Sarajevo [Kantonalni zavod za zaštitu kulturno–historijskog i prirodnog naslijeđa Sarajevo]
- Public Institution Institute for the Protection and Use of Cultural–Historical and Natural Heritage of Tuzla Canton [JU Zavod za zaštitu i korištenje kulturno–historijskog i prirodnog naslijeđa Tuzlanskog kantona]
- Cantonal Institute for Urbanism, Spatial Planning and Protection of the Cultural and Historical Heritage of the Central Bosnian Canton [Kantonalni zavod za urbanizam, prostorno planiranje i zaštitu kulturno–historijskog naslijeđa Srednjobosanskog Kantona]
- Institute for the Protection of Cultural and Historical Heritage of Herzegovina–Neretva Canton [Zavod za zaštitu kulturno–historijske baštine Hercegovačko–Neretvanskog Kantona]
- Public Institution Institute for the Protection of Cultural Heritage Bihać – Una-Sana Canton [JU Zavod za zaštitu kulturnog naslijeđa Bihać – Unsko–Sanski Kanton]
- Institute for the Protection of Cultural Heritage of the Zenica–Doboj Canton [Zavod za zaštitu kulturne baštine Zeničko–dobojskog kantona]
- Public Institution Agency for cultural–historical and natural heritage and development of the tourist potential of the city of Jajce [JU Agencija za kulturno–povijesnu i prirodnu baštinu i razvoj turističkih potencijala grada Jajca]

== Botswana ==
Botswana: Sites and monuments in Botswana

== Brazil ==
Brazil: List of National Historic Heritage of Brazil, as maintained by the National Institute of Historic and Artistic Heritage; (in Portuguese) Listas de patrimônio do Brasil

== Bulgaria ==
Bulgaria: National Institute of Immovable Cultural Heritage

== Cambodia ==
Cambodia: Law on the Protection of Cultural Heritage

== Cameroon ==
Cameroon (in French): Liste de monuments du Cameroun

== Canada ==
Canada: The Canadian Register of Historic Places, while it confers no historic designation or protection itself, endeavours to list all federal, provincial, territorial and local sites.

Federal

- National Historic Sites of Canada

Provincial

- Alberta
  - Sites owned and run by the provincial government as a functioning historic site or museum are known as Provincial Historic Sites and Provincial Historic Areas. Buildings and sites owned by private citizens and companies or other levels or branches of government may gain one of two levels of historic designation, "Registered Historic Resource" or "Provincial Historic Resource". Historic designation in Alberta is governed by the Historic Resources Act. The province also lists buildings deemed historically significant by municipal governments on the Alberta Register of Historic Places, which is also part of the larger Canadian Register of Historic Places although this does not imply provincial or federal government status or protection. The Alberta Main Street Program helps to preserve historic buildings in the downtowns of smaller communities. The Heritage Survey Program is a survey of 80,000 historic buildings in Alberta, with no protective status.
- British Columbia
  - Historic sites in British Columbia may be added to that province's register of historic places under section 18 of the Heritage Conservation Act.
- New Brunswick
  - Places and areas designated under the Heritage Conservation Act (the New Brunswick Register of Historic Places acts as a register of sites designated under the Act)
- Newfoundland
  - Heritage Foundation of Newfoundland and Labrador designated properties
- Ontario
  - Properties designated under the Ontario Heritage Act
- Quebec
  - Répertoire du patrimoine culturel du Québec

Local

- Heritage buildings of Vancouver
- City of Toronto Heritage Property Inventory
- Register of Historic Resources in Edmonton

== Chile ==
Chile: National Monuments of Chile, as maintained by the Consejo de Monumentos Nacionales

== China ==
China: Major Historical and Cultural Site Protected at the National Level (全国重点文物保护单位), designated by State Administration of Cultural Heritage

Hangzhou

Sites Protected at the City Level of Hangzhou are districts, artifacts or buildings legally declared to be "protected". According to the "Regularations of historic districts and historic buildings in Hangzhou" effectivated from 1 January 2005, historic buildings are those artifacts or districts that have lasted more than 50 years, and of significant values for history, science, and art study. In Hangzhou, declaring a historic house requires consulting the urban planning administration bureau, and the real estate administration bureau.

As of 31 June 2011, there are 287 declared historic houses in Hangzhou, proclaimed as 5 batches. In the near future, it is going to issue the sixth batch which includes 51 historic houses.

- List of first batch of declared historic buildings in Hangzhou
- List of second batch of declared historic buildings in Hangzhou
- List of third batch of declared historic buildings in Hangzhou
- List of fourth batch of declared historic buildings in Hangzhou
- List of fifth batch of declared historic buildings in Hangzhou

Harbin

- Harbin Urban and Rural Planning Bureau
  - Preserved Buildings

== Colombia ==
Colombia: National monuments of Colombia; (in Spanish) Monumentos Nacionales de Colombia

== Comoros ==
Comoros: National Committee of Intangible Cultural Heritage (Comoros)

== Republic of the Congo ==
Republic of the Congo: Protection of Cultural Heritage in the Republic of the Congo

== Costa Rica ==
Costa Rica (in Spanish) Monumento Nacional de Costa Rica

== Croatia ==
Croatia: Register of Protected Natural Values of the Republic of Croatia

- Register of Cultural Goods of the Republic of Croatia

== Cuba ==
Cuba: Consejo Nacional de Patrimonio Cultural

== Cyprus ==
Cyprus: Heritage Gazetteer of Cyprus

== Czech Republic ==
Czech: (in Czech) Seznam národních kulturních památek České republiky, (in German) Liste der Nationalen Kulturdenkmale Tschechiens, as featuring on MonumNet

== Democratic Republic of the Congo ==
Democratic Republic of the Congo: National Inventory of the Cultural Heritage of the Democratic Republic of the Congo

== Denmark ==
Denmark: National Register of Sites and Monuments, as maintained by the Danish Agency for Culture

== Djibouti ==
Djibouti: List of monuments of Djibouti

== Dominica ==
Dominica: Dominica Cultural Division

== Dominican Republic ==
Dominican Republic: Cultural heritage sites in the Dominican Republic

== East Timor ==
East Timor: Intangible Cultural Heritage of East Timor

== Ecuador ==
Ecuador: Monuments of Ecuador

== Egypt ==
Egypt: List of Historic Monuments in Cairo as recorded by Comité de Conservation des Monuments de l'Art Arabe, the predecessor of the Supreme Council of Antiquities.

== El Salvador ==
El Salvador: Cultural heritage sites in El Salvador

== Estonia ==
Estonia: National Registry of Cultural Monuments, maintained by the National Heritage Board of Estonia. It has been described as one of the most successful and more complete heritage registers.

- Estonian inventory of intangible cultural heritage, maintained by the Estonian Folk Culture Centre.

== Eswatini ==
Eswatini: National Monuments of Swaziland, as maintained by the Swaziland National Trust Commission

== Ethiopia ==
Ethiopia: Ethio-SPaRe: Cultural Heritage of Christian Ethiopia

== Fiji ==
Fiji: National Trust of Fiji and National Sites and Places of Heritage Significance

== Finland ==
Finland: There are two registers confirmed at the state level:

- Nationally significant built cultural environments in Finland (Finnish: Valtakunnallisesti merkittävät rakennetut kulttuuriympäristöt, Swedish: Byggda kulturmiljöer av riksintresse), compiled by the Finnish Heritage Agency
- Nationally valuable landscapes in Finland (Finnish: Valtakunnallisesti arvokkaat maisema-alueet, Swedish: Nationellt värdefulla landskapsområden), compiled by the Finnish Environment Institute

== France ==
France: Monument historique

- Mérimée List
- List of historic monuments of 1840. See Liste des monuments historiques de 1840, at Fr. Wikipedia

== Gabon ==
Gabon: List of monuments of Gabon

== Gambia ==
Gambia: HerMaP Gambia

== Georgia ==
Georgia: The National Agency for Cultural Heritage Preservation of Georgia is a government agency responsible for preservation, protection, research and promotion of cultural heritage of the country. The Agency maintains three registers of Georgia's cultural heritage:

- Immovable Cultural Monuments
  - Immovable Cultural Monuments of National Significance
- Movable Cultural Monuments
- Intangible cultural heritage of Georgia

== Germany ==
Germany: The Deutsche Stiftung Denkmalschutz is an organization which facilitates public awareness and protection of heritage sites listed. These lists are kept on the website denkmalliste.org, which has all German heritage registers ("Denkmallisten") gathered together in one portal.

- Kulturdenkmal
  - Bayerische Denkmalliste

== Ghana ==
Ghana: Ghana's material cultural heritage

== Greece ==
Greece: Cultural heritage of Greece

== Grenada ==
Grenada: Grenada National Trust

== Guam ==
Guam: Chamorro heritage sites (Guam)

== Guatemala ==
Guatemala: Historical monuments of Guatemala

== Guinea ==
Guinea: List of monuments of Guinea

== Guinea-Bissau ==
Guinea-Bissau: List of monuments of Guinea-Bissau

== Guyana ==
Guyana: National Trust of Guyana

== Haiti ==
Haiti: (in French) Culture et Patrimoine, as maintained by the Gouverment d'Haïti

- National Register of Cultural Heritage (Haiti)

== Honduras ==
Honduras: Patrimonio Cultural de la Nación (Honduras)

== Hong Kong ==
Hong Kong:

- Monuments
  - Declared monuments of Hong Kong
- Historic Buildings
  - List of Grade I historic buildings in Hong Kong
  - List of Grade II historic buildings in Hong Kong
  - List of Grade III historic buildings in Hong Kong

== Hungary ==
Hungary: The Forster Gyula Nemzeti Örökségvédelmi és Vagyongazdálkodási Központ was an organization which facilitates public awareness and protection of heritage sites listed up to 2016.12.31. (There are partial list from 8 county of Hungary). From 2017.01.01. the cultural heritage management is in the competence the Prime Minister's Office and the Hungarian Academy of Arts.

- Műemlékem is a non official list maintained by a non-governmental organization.

== Iceland ==
Iceland: Cultural Heritage Agency of Iceland

== India ==
India: National Archives of India, a government agency run by Ministry of Culture

National level

- Monuments of National Importance of India: designated by the Archeological Survey of India and maintained by the union government of India
- National Geological Monuments of India: designated by the Geological Survey of India and maintained by the union government of India

State level

- State Protected Monuments of India: designated by the Archeological Survey of India and maintained by the state governments of India

== Indonesia ==
Indonesia: Cultural Properties of Indonesia

== Iran ==
Iran: Iran National Heritage List is a register of nationally significant monuments, places, buildings, archaeological sites, events, etc., officially registered under the National Heritage Preservation Act of 1930. According to Article 1 of this law, "All the industrial monuments and buildings that were built up to the end of the Zand dynasty in the country of Iran, including movable and immovable in accordance with Article 13 of this law, can be considered as national heritage of Iran and under the protection and supervision of the state."

== Iraq ==
Iraq: Iraq Heritage

== Ireland ==
Ireland: In the Republic of Ireland, some registers are maintained by sections of the Department of Housing, Local Government and Heritage (including the National Monuments Service, Archaeological Survey of Ireland, and National Built Heritage Service). Others are maintained by the local authority for the county, city, or city and county where the monument or building is sited.

| Name | Type | Maintenance |
|---|---|---|
| National monument | "a monument or the remains of a monument the preservation of which is a matter of national importance by reason of the historical, architectural, traditional, artistic, or archaeological interest attaching thereto" | Owned or managed by the National Monuments Service. The Service's own list of monuments is not definitive. |
| protected structure | "structures, or parts of structures, which form part of the architectural heritage and which are of special architectural, historical, archaeological, artistic, cultural, scientific, social or technical interest" | Relevant planning authority maintains a list as part of its development plan. |
| architectural conservation area | "a place, area, group of structures or townscape, taking account of building lines and heights, that— (a) is of special architectural, historical, archaeological, artistic, cultural, scientific, social or technical interest or value, or (b) contributes to the appreciation of protected structures" | Planning authority |
| special planning control area | "an architectural conservation area [...] of special importance to, or as respects, the civic life or the architectural, historical, cultural or social character of a city or town in which it is situated" | Planning authority |
| area of special amenity | "by reason of— (a) its outstanding natural beauty, or (b) its special recreational value, and having regard to any benefits for nature conservation" | Planning authority |
| National Inventory of Architectural Heritage | "all— (a) structures and buildings together with their settings and attendant grounds, fixtures and fittings, (b) groups of such structures and buildings, and (c) sites, which are of architectural, historical, archaeological, artistic, cultural, scientific, social or technical interest" | National Built Heritage Service (NBHS). The NBHS's survey is an on-going exercise. |
| Database of Historic Gardens and Designed Landscapes | Gardens marked on the first- or second-edition (1850–95) maps of the Ordnance Survey of Ireland. | National Built Heritage Service |

== Israel ==
Israel: List of National Heritage Sites of Israel; cf. Council for Conservation of Heritage Sites in Israel

== Italy ==
Italy: Catalogo Generale dei Beni Culturali under creation; catalogo regionale dei beni culturali already maintained by each region:

- Emilia-Romagna: WebGIS del patrimonio culturale dell'Emilia Romagna
- Lombardy: Sistema Informativo dei Beni Culturali della Regione Lombardia (SIRBeC)

== Ivory Coast ==
Ivory Coast: (in French) Liste des monuments historiques de la Côte d'Ivoire

== Jamaica ==
Jamaica: Jamaica National Heritage Trust, established in 1958. The organisation maintains a list of National Heritage Sites in Jamaica.

== Japan ==
Japan: Cultural Properties of Japan, as maintained by the Agency for Cultural Affairs; see also National Treasures of Japan

== Jordan ==
Jordan: Department of Antiquities (Jordan)

== Kazakhstan ==
Kazakhstan: Cultural Heritage (Kazakhstan)

== Kenya ==
Kenya: List of sites and monuments in Kenya

== Kiribati ==
Kiribati: Cultural Heritage of Kiribati

== Korea (North) ==
North Korea: National Treasures of North Korea, Cultural assets of North Korea

== Korea (South) ==
South Korea: National Treasures of South Korea, Historic Sites of South Korea, Important Intangible Cultural Properties of Korea, etc., as maintained by Cultural Heritage Administration

== Kosovo ==
Kosovo: Cultural heritage of Kosovo

== Kuwait ==
Kuwait: National Council for Culture, Arts and Literature

- List of monuments of Kuwait

== Laos ==
Laos: Cultural Heritage Management (Laos)

== Latvia ==
Latvia: "The list of State protected cultural monuments", available at . Contains information about 7371 monuments of culture (As of March 2021). The list is maintained by State Inspection for Heritage Protection, a government agency.

Full list is available at valsts aizsargājamo kultūras pieminekļu saraksts (in Latvian).

== Lebanon ==
Lebanon: (in French) Monument historique (Liban)

== Lesotho ==
Lesotho: Lesotho Heritage Network

== Liberia ==
Liberia: Heritage Liberia

== Libya ==
Libya: Heritage Gazetteer of Libya

== Liechtenstein ==
Liechtenstein: Liechtenstein National Archives.

Kulturgüterregister (in German).

== Lithuania ==
Lithuania: Registry of Cultural Property (Lithuania)

The list is available here.

== Luxembourg ==
Luxembourg

- "Buildings and objects classified as national monuments or listed on supplementary inventory".

The list is maintained by Service des sites et monuments nationaux, a Government agency. The latest version is available here.

See Lëscht vun de klasséierte Monumenter on lb-wiki and commons:Category:Cultural heritage monuments in Luxembourg.

== Madagascar ==
Madagascar (in French): Liste des sites et monuments culturels de Madagascar

== Malaysia ==
Malaysia: National Heritage Register (Malaysia)

== Malta ==
Malta: National Inventory of the Cultural Property of the Maltese Islands

== Marshall Islands ==
Marshall Islands: Cultural Heritage Legislation in the Marshall Islands

== Martinique ==
Martinique: Cultural heritage of Martinique

== Mauritania ==
Mauritania (in French) Liste des monuments nationaux de la Mauritanie

== Mauritius ==
Mauritius: Ministry of Arts and Cultural Heritage (Mauritius)

== Mexico ==
Mexico: National Monuments of Mexico

== Moldova ==
Moldova: National Register of Intangible Cultural Heritage (Moldova)

== Mongolia ==
Mongolia: Cultural Heritage Program (Mongolia)

== Morocco ==
Morocco: Historic Monuments and Sites of Morocco

== Mozambique ==
Mozambique: Cultural Properties of Mozambique

== Myanmar ==
Myanmar:

- Yangon City Heritage List,
- Myanmar National Environmental Policy

== Namibia ==
Namibia: National Monuments, as maintained by the National Heritage Council of Namibia; (in German) Liste der Nationalen Denkmäler in Namibia

== Nauru ==
Nauru: Nauru National Heritage Register

== Nepal ==
Nepal: List of monuments in Nepal

== Netherlands ==
Netherlands: List of Rijksmonuments (Monumentenregister van de Rijksdienst voor het cultureel erfgoed)

== New Caledonia ==
New Caledonia: Patrimoine natural et culturel de la Nouvelle-Caledonia.

== New Zealand ==
New Zealand Rarangi Taonga: The Register of Historic Places, Historic Areas, Wahi Tapu and Wahi Tapu Areas (administered by New Zealand Historic Places Trust.)

== Nicaragua ==
Nicaragua: List of monuments of Nicaragua

== Niger ==
Niger: Niger Heritage

== Nigeria ==
Nigeria: National Cultural Policy (Nigeria)

== North Macedonia ==
North Macedonia: (in French) Patrimoine culturel de la République de Macédoine

== Norway ==
Norway: (in Norwegian) Lister over kulturminner i Norge; Immateriell kulturarv; Norway Heritage Community; Cultural Heritage Act

== Pakistan ==
Pakistan: There are several organizations that take care of historic and heritage sites in Pakistan.

1. Department of Archaeology and Museums (Ministry of Heritage and National Integration (Pakistan))
2. National Archives of Pakistan
3. Directorate of Archaeology & Museums, Sindh
  1. Sindh Building Control Authority
4. Directorate General of Archaeology, Punjab
5. Directorate of Archaeology & Museums, of Khyber Pakhtunkhwa.
6. Directorate General of Archaeology, Balochistan
7. List of cultural heritage sites in Pakistan

== Palau ==
Palau: Bureau of Cultural and Historic Preservation, as maintained by Title 19, Chapter 1 of the Palau National Code

== Palestine ==
Palestine: Palestinian Heritage Foundation

== Panama ==
Panama (in Spanish) Monumentos de Panamá

== Papua New Guinea ==
Papua New Guinea: National Cultural Commission (Papua New Guinea)

== Paraguay ==
Paraguay: El Inventario Nacional de Bienes Culturales, under creation by the Dirección de Catalogación del Patrimonio Cultural

== Peru ==
Peru: Patrimonio Cultural de la Nación (Perú)

== Philippines ==
Philippines: Cultural Properties of the Philippines

== Poland ==
Poland: A list of objects of cultural heritage in Poland (zabytki) is maintained by the National Heritage Board of Poland. It is primarily composed of objects in the register of objects of cultural heritage (rejestr zabytków), objects with the status of Historical Monument (pomnik historii), objects classified as a cultural park (park kulturowy).

== Portugal ==
Portugal: National Monuments, as maintained by IGESPAR; (in Portuguese) pt:Lista de património edificado em Portugal

== Puerto Rico ==
Puerto Rico: (in Spanish) Patrimonio Histórico Edificado, as maintained by the Institute of Puerto Rican Culture (Instituto de Cultura Puertorriqueña) which functions as the territory State Historic Preservation Office, in association to the United States National Register of Historic Places. The Puerto Rico Planning Board also maintains the Puerto Rico Register of Historic Sites and Zones (Registro Nacional de Sitios y Zonas Históricas).

== Qatar ==
Qatar: Qatar Foundation

== Romania ==
Romania: National Register of Historic Monuments in Romania – The list, created in 2004–2005, contains historical monuments entered in the National Cultural Heritage of Romania. It is maintained by the Romanian National Institute of Historical Monuments, part of the Ministry of Culture and National Patrimony in Romania.

== Russia ==
Russia: Russian cultural heritage register; (in Russian) Списки объектов культурного наследия России; Historical Cities of Russia

== Rwanda ==
Rwanda: List of cultural heritage monuments in Rwanda

== Saint Kitts and Nevis ==
Saint Kitts and Nevis: St. Christopher National Trust

== Saint Lucia ==
Saint Lucia: Saint Lucia National Trust

== Samoa ==
Samoa:

- Documentation of Samoan Archaeological and Built Heritage Places and Associated Oral Traditions
- National Heritage Board (Samoa)

== San Marino ==
San Marino: Institute for the Conservation and Valorization of Cultural Heritage

== Saudi Arabia ==
Saudi Arabia: National Antiquities Register, as maintained by the Heritage Commission.

- Saudi Heritage Preservation Society

== Senegal ==
Senegal: Sites et Monuments historiques; (in French) Liste des monuments et sites historiques au Sénégal

- La Direction du Patrimoine Culturel (Senegal)

== Serbia ==
Serbia

Cultural Heritage of Serbia

The register is divided into twelve categories:

| Exceptional Importance | Great Importance | Protected |
|---|---|---|
| Archaeological Sites of Exceptional Importance | Archaeological Sites of Great Importance | Protected Archaeological Sites |
| Monuments of Culture of Exceptional Importance | Monuments of Culture of Great Importance | Protected Monuments of Culture |
| Historic Landmarks of Exceptional Importance | Historic Landmarks of Great Importance | Protected Historic Landmarks |
| Spatial Cultural-Historical Units of Exceptional Importance | Spatial Cultural-Historical Units of Great Importance | Protected Spatial Cultural-Historical Units |

== Seychelles ==
Seychelles: Seychelles Heritage Foundation

== Sierra Leone ==
Sierra Leone: National Monuments of Sierra Leone, as maintained by the Ancient Monuments and Relics Commission

== Singapore ==
Singapore: National Monuments of Singapore

== Slovakia ==
Slovakia: Cultural Heritage Monuments of Slovakia; (in German) Liste (Kulturdenkmale in der Slowakei)

== Slovenia ==
Slovenia: Register of Cultural Heritage of Slovenia; (in Slovenia) Register kulturne dediščine Slovenije

The register consists of three parts:

- Register nepremične kulturne dediščine (the Register of Immovable Cultural Heritage), it is subdivided into Cultural Monuments of National Importance and Cultural Monuments of Local Importance.
- Register premične kulturne dediščine (the Register of Movable Cultural Heritage)
- Register nesnovne kulturne dediščine (the Register of Intangible Cultural Heritage)

== Solomon Islands ==
Solomon Islands: Protected Areas Act (Solomon Islands) and Culture Division (Solomon Islands)

== Somalia ==
Somalia: Cultural Heritage Database (Somalia)

== South Africa ==
South Africa: South African Heritage Resources Agency

- List of heritage sites in South Africa

== Spain ==
Spain: Monument (Spain) (Monumento histórico or Bien de Interés Cultural)

- Lists of Bienes de Interés Cultural

== Sri Lanka ==
Sri Lanka: Archaeological Heritage Management (Sri Lanka)

== Sudan ==
Sudan: Digital Cultural Heritage Register (Sudan)

== Suriname ==
Suriname: Suriname Heritage Guide

== Sweden ==
Sweden: Listed buildings in Sweden, as maintained by the Swedish National Heritage Board; see also (in Swedish) Kulturmärkning i Sverige

== Switzerland ==
Switzerland: Swiss Inventory of Cultural Property (German: Schweizerisches Inventar der Kulturgüter, French: Inventaire suisse des biens culturels). National register of some 8,300 objects of international, national, regional and local significance. Managed by the Federal Office for Civil Protection (see its website).

- There are also cantonal registers of cultural heritage sites.
- Schweizer Seilbahninventar: inventory of aerial cableways (aerial tramways, gondola lifts, chair lifts, material ropeways), funiculars and ski lifts.
- See also Category:Heritage registers in Switzerland.

== Syria ==
Syria: Syrian Heritage Initiative

== Taiwan ==
Taiwan: Bureau of Cultural Heritage, which keeps a list on their website.

- List of national monuments of Taiwan

== Tanzania ==
Tanzania: National Historic Sites in Tanzania

== Thailand ==
Thailand: see Cultural heritage conservation in Thailand

== Togo ==
Togo: (in French) Liste nationale d'inventaire des biens culturels du Togo

== Tonga ==
Tonga: Tonga Heritage Society

== Trinidad and Tobago ==
Trinidad and Tobago: National Trust of Trinidad and Tobago

== Tunisia ==
Tunisia: (in French) Liste des monuments classés de Tunisie

== Turkey ==
Turkey: Immovable Cultural and Natural Properties (Turkish: Korunması Gerekli Taşınmaz Kültür ve Tabiat Varlıkları) (see )

== Turkmenistan ==
Turkmenistan: National Register of Cultural Heritage Sites (Turkmenistan)

== Tuvalu ==
Tuvalu: Tuvalu National Cultural Policy

== Uganda ==
Uganda: National Cultural Sites of Uganda

== Ukraine ==
Ukraine:

- National Inventory of Elements of the Intangible Cultural Heritage of Ukraine
- State Register of Immovable Monuments of Ukraine

== United Arab Emirates ==
United Arab Emirates: Cultural heritage of the United Arab Emirates

== United Kingdom ==
United Kingdom

Heritage, culture, planning and conservation are devolved issues in the United Kingdom, and are dealt with by the governments of the constituent countries. England, which does not have its own devolved government, is covered by an agency of the United Kingdom government.

See also historic environment records (HERs) and sites and monuments records (SMRs), maintained usually at a local government level (archaeological trusts in Wales).

- The Schedule of Ancient Monuments (follows the pre-devolution Ancient Monuments and Archaeological Areas Act 1979)
- England: Historic England, a non-departmental public body of the Department for Culture, Media and Sport
  - The National Heritage List for England (launched May 2011). Contains list of all scheduled monuments, listed buildings, registered parks and gardens, historic wrecks and registered historic battlefields in England
  - Historic England Archive: formerly the National Monuments Record (England)
  - Register of Parks and Gardens
  - Registered battlefields
  - Protection of Wrecks Act 1973
  - Heritage at Risk Register
- Northern Ireland: Both scheduled and listed buildings are registered and otherwise handled by the Department for Communities of the Northern Ireland Executive. (Until 16 May 2016, these roles were held by the Northern Ireland Environment Agency, an executive agency within the Department of the Environment.) Northern Ireland also has an additional register of state care monuments.
  - Northern Ireland Sites and Monuments Record
  - Listed Buildings
  - Historic Environment Record of Northern Ireland
- Scotland:
  - Historic Environment Scotland, an executive agency of the Culture, Tourism and Major Events Directorate, part of the Scottish Government
    - Inventory of Historic Battlefields
    - Inventory of Gardens and Designed Landscapes in Scotland
    - National Record of the Historic Environment (NRHE): the archive formerly known as the National Monuments Record of Scotland (NMRS), and before that the Scottish National Buildings Record
    - Canmore: a database that is part of the NRHE
- Wales:
  - Cadw, an agency of the Welsh Government
    - Scheduled monuments in Wales
    - Cadw/ICOMOS Register of Parks and Gardens of Special Historic Interest in Wales
  - Royal Commission on the Ancient and Historical Monuments of Wales, a Welsh Government sponsored body
    - National Monuments Record of Wales (NMRW)
    - Coflein: the online database for the NMRW

=== Other Associated States or Territories ===
Although not part of the United Kingdom itself, these are self-governing states or territories with strong ties to the British Crown or the United Kingdom, often putting defence and foreign relations in to their hands while handling all other matters internally. All have the British Monarch as their head of state.

==== Crown Dependencies ====
The Crown Dependencies are three states which are possessions of the Crown, geographically in the British Isles or the Channel Islands.

- Bailiwick of Guernsey: National Trust of Guernsey
- Bailiwick of Jersey: States Assembly
  - Listed buildings in Jersey
- Isle of Man: Manx National Heritage

==== Overseas Territories ====
The British Overseas Territories (also known as the "United Kingdom Overseas Territories") are the last remnants of the British Empire. There are fourteen total, however, not all of these have heritage registers.

- Bermuda: Bermuda National Trust
- Cayman Islands: National Trust for the Cayman Islands
- Gibraltar: Ministry for Heritage together with the Gibraltar Heritage Trust
- Falkland Islands: Historic Buildings Committee
  - Listed buildings in the Falkland Islands

== United States ==
In the United States, a site is only listed on the National Register of Historic Places on recommendation from the state historic preservation offices in the relevant state. Some states maintain their own state-level historic registers, although in some U.S. states all properties on the state register duplicate the National Register listing. The National Register listing in itself confers no protection to a historic property but may qualify the site for matching grants for historic restoration. Local historic designations in many municipalities provide some limited protection against demolition of historic landmarks.

National

- United States national monuments are a separate register from the National Register of Historic Places
- National Historic Landmarks
- National Natural Landmarks
- American Presbyterian/Reformed Historic Sites Registry

State-level and local-level

- Alabama
  - Alabama Register of Landmarks and Heritage
- California
  - California Historical Landmarks
  - California Register of Historical Resources
  - California Points of Historical Interest
  - Berkeley Landmarks in Berkeley, California
  - Los Angeles Historic-Cultural Monuments
  - San Francisco Designated Landmarks
- Georgia (U.S. state)
  - List of historic buildings and districts designated by the City of Atlanta
- Hawaii
  - Hawai'i Register of Historic Places
- Illinois
  - Chicago Landmarks
- Michigan
  - Michigan Historic Sites
- Mississippi
  - Mississippi Landmarks
- New York
  - New York State Register of Historic Places
  - Designated historic properties in Amherst, New York listed at the town level
  - City of Buffalo landmarks and historic districts (designated by the Buffalo Preservation Board)
  - New York City Landmarks (designated by the New York City Landmarks Preservation Commission)
  - Town of Oyster Bay Landmarks
  - Local landmarks in Williamsville, New York
- Pennsylvania
  - Philadelphia Register of Historic Places
  - List of City of Pittsburgh historic designations
- Texas
  - List of National Historic Landmarks in Texas
  - National Register of Historic Places listings in Texas
  - List of Recorded Texas Historic Landmarks (RTHL)
  - Texas Historical Commission Historical Markers
- Virginia
  - Virginia Historic Landmarks Register
- Washington
  - Washington State Heritage Register

== Uruguay ==
Uruguay: (in Spanish) Monumento Histórico Nacional

== Uzbekistan ==
Uzbekistan: List of monuments of Uzbekistan

== Vanuatu ==
Vanuatu: Vanuatu National Heritage Registry

== Venezuela ==
Venezuela: Inventario de monumentos, as maintained by the Instituto de Patrimonio Cultural

== Vietnam ==
Vietnam: Friends of Vietnam Heritage

== Yemen ==
Yemen: Ancient Yemen Digital Atlas

== Zambia ==
Zambia: Monuments and Historic Sites of Zambia

== Zimbabwe ==
Zimbabwe: National Monuments of Zimbabwe
