= FVHS =

FVHS may refer to:

- Forest View High School (Illinois), a defunct school in Arlington Heights, Illinois, United States
- Forest View High School, Tokoroa, in New Zealand
- Fort Vancouver High School in Vancouver, Washington, United States
- Fountain Valley High School in Fountain Valley, California, United States
- Franklin Virtual High School, an American private online school
- Fuquay-Varina High School in Fuquay-Varina, North Carolina, United States

== See also ==
- FVH (disambiguation)
