= Virtual High School =

Virtual High School may refer to:

- Franklin Virtual High School
- Michigan Virtual High School
- Virtual High School (Ontario)
