= List of third batch of declared historic buildings in Hangzhou =

Declared historic buildings of Hangzhou are districts, artifacts or buildings legally declared to be "protected". According to the "Regulations of historic districts and historic buildings in Hangzhou" effective from 1 January 2005, historic buildings are those artifacts or districts that have lasted more than 50 years, and of significant values for history, science, and art study. In Hangzhou, declaring a historic house requires consulting the urban planning administration bureau, and the real estate administration bureau.

Contents: Batches of Hangzhou declared historic buildings / See also: Hangzhou
- First batch
- Second batch
- Third batch
- Fourth batch
- Fifth batch

As of 31 June 2011, there are 287 declared historic buildings in Hangzhou, proclaimed as 5 batches.[17] In the near future, it is going to issue the sixth batch which includes 51 historic houses.

== List of third batch of declared historic buildings in Hangzhou ==
70 buildings were declared to be the third batch of historic houses in Hang Zhou, in March 2007. The following information is provided by Real Estate Administration Bureau & Research Institute for Historic buildings in Hangzhou.

No.	Name	Notes/References	Photographs
LSJZ3-1	The Former Site of Tea Alms Villa	Constructed in the 1920s, this traditional courtyard-style building was former nongovernmental charitable agency. It consists of No.13, and No.18 buildings in Jixiangsi Alley.	
LSJZ3-2	Yao's Residence at Xiaohezhijie Street	Constructed in the 1940s, it is a 2-store residence in wood and brick-clad, embodying the transition from traditional to contemporary style.	
LSJZ3-3	Meihe Tang Residence	Constructed in the 1930s, it is a stone-arched gate villa in plain-brick style, including 4,5,8,9,11,12,14 buildings in Lin’anli Alley and 3–11 in Jiaochang Road.	
LSJZ3-4	Building Cluster at Longxiangli Alley	Constructed in the 1920s, these buildings are side-by-side dwelling villas lined in Alleys, embodying the transition from traditional to contemporary style.	
LSJZ3-5	Lakeside Building Cluster	Constructed in the 1920s, it is made up of side-by-side dwelling villas lined in Alleys. This is an instance witnessing the evolution of contemporary residence.	
LSJZ3-6	Building Cluster at Daqingli Alley	Constructed in the 1920s, these buildings are dwelling Villas in Alleys, embodying the transition from traditional to contemporary style.	
LSJZ3-7	Hu's Residence at Quanyeli Alley	Constructed in the 1920s, this courtyard villa reflects the transition of traditional architecture to the imitation of the Western forms.	
LSJZ3-8	Building at Xiaonu Road	Constructed in the 1920s, the villa reflects the transition of traditional architecture to the imitation of the Western forms.	
LSJZ3-9	Building Cluster at Sixinfang Alley	Constructed in the 1920s, the buildings are alley residences, reflecting the evolution of the economic alley residences (a popular form in Guangdong Province).	
LSJZ3-10	Building Cluster at Chengdeli Alley	Constructed in the 1920s, the buildings are alley residences, reflecting the evolution of the economic alley residences (a popular form in Guangdong Province).	
LSJZ3-11	Xu's Residence at Sixinfang Alley	Constructed in the 1930s, it is an imitation of the Western-style villa, consisting of No.1 and No. 2 buildings in Zhinong Alley.	
LSJZ3-12	Hu Zaoqing's Former Residence	Constructed in the 1930s, it is an imitation of the Western-style villa, reflecting the evolution of contemporary residences.	
LSJZ3-13	He Zhuguo’s Former Residence	Constructed in the 1940s, it is a courtyard villa, reflecting the evolution of contemporary residences.	
LSJZ3-14	Liexian Tang Villa	Built in the 1930s, this courtyard reflects the history of contemporary residence using a blending of the Chinese and the Western styles.	
LSJZ3-15	Chengle Tang Residence	Constructed in the 1930s, it is a courtyard villa. Its former owner was Yu Shaosong, a famous artist in contemporary China.	
LSJZ3-16	Hu's Residence at Fangguyuan Alley	Constructed in the 1920s, this traditional courtyard-style building is of wood and brick-clad structure. There are the few remains of the style during the evolution of contemporary urban architecture.	
LSJZ3-17	Building at 3, Yinqiangban Alley	Constructed in the early 20th century, it is a building in wood and brick-clad, reflecting the evolution of contemporary residence.	
LSJZ3-18	Building at 238, West Lake Road	Constructed in the 1930s, this courtyard villa reflects the transition of traditional architecture to the imitation of the Western forms.	
LSJZ3-19	Building Cluster at Pingyuanli Alley	Constructed in the early 1920s, these buildings reflect the transition of the lined-in-Alleys design of contemporary residences.	
LSJZ3-20	Building Cluster at Qiafengli Alley	Constructed in the early 1920s, these buildings reflect the transition of the lined-in-Alleys design of contemporary residences.	
LSJZ3-21	The Former Site of Chinese Oil Company Zhejiang Branch	Constructed in the 1930s, it is a 3-story building in wood and brick-clad, reflecting the evolution of contemporary architecture.	
LSJZ3-22	Building at 209, Jiefang Road	Constructed in the 1930s, this hybrid Western-style commercial building reflects the evolution of contemporary architecture.	
LSJZ3-23	Building Cluster at Siweili Alley	Constructed in the early 20th century, these buildings are alley residences, reflecting the transition of the early lined-in-Alleys design of contemporary architecture.	
LSJZ3-24	Building at 125, Jianguo Road (S)	Constructed in the later 19th century, this courtyard-style villa reflects the course of the blending of the Chinese syle with the Western style.	
LSJZ3-25	Building at 129, Jianguo Road (S)	Constructed in the 1860s, it is a traditional courtyard villa in wood and brick-clad. It was the Shuide Nunnery.	
LSJZ3-26	The Former Site of Shengchang Department Store	Constructed in the 1920s, this hybrid Western-style commercial building reflects the evolution of contemporary architecture.	
LSJZ3-27	The Former Site of Xianzhang Silk Store	Constructed in the 1920s, this hybrid Western-style commercial building reflects the evolution of contemporary architecture.	
LSJZ3-28	The Former Site of Wuzhou Drugstore	Constructed in the 1920s, this hybrid Western-style commercial building is in reinforced concrete structure, reflecting the evolution of contemporary architecture.	
LSJZ3-29	Buildings at 168–4, and 170, Zhongshan Zhong Road	Constructed in the 1920s, these hybrid Western-style commercial buildings reflect the evolution of contemporary architecture.	
LSJZ3-30	The Former Site of Huade Drugstore	Constructed in the 1920s, this commercial building reflects the history of decorating traditional commercial buildings with a hybrid Western-style storefront.	
LSJZ3-31	Building at 229, Zhongshan Zhong Road	Constructed in the 1920s, this commercial building has a typical hybrid Western style, reflecting the evolution of contemporary architecture.	
LSJZ3-32	Xu's Residence at Dongping Alley	Constructed in the 1930s, it is a courtyard villa, reflecting the history of blending the Chinese style with the Western style.	
LSJZ3-33	Bohai Yilu Residence	Constructed in the 1930s, it is a building in wood and brick-clad. It is the former residence of the famous herbalist doctor named Qiu Xiaomei.	
LSJZ3-34	Yunge Tang Villa	Constructed in the 1920s, it is a courtyard villa in wood and brick-clad, embodying the transition from traditional to contemporary style.	
LSJZ3-35	Zhang's Residence at Jishanfang Alley	Constructed in the 1870s, it is a traditional courtyard villa in timber structure. They are the few remains of this style in the evolution of contemporary urban architecture.	
LSJZ3-36	Building at 9, Sanyuanfang Alley	Constructed in the 1870s, it is a traditional courtyard villa in timber structure. Its appearance is an early instance of applying Western style to traditional buildings.	
LSJZ3-37	Building at 4, Bishengmiao Alley	Constructed in the early 20th century, it is a 3-store villa in wood and brick-clad, embodying the transition from traditional to contemporary style.	
LSJZ3-38	Buildings at 152, and 154, Hefangjie Street	Both of the buildings were constructed in the late 19th century, reflecting the history of decorating traditional commercial buildings with a hybrid Western-style storefront.	
LSJZ3-39	Building at 397, Hefangjie Street	It is a courtyard villa constructed in the 1940s, reflecting the history of contemporary residences imitating Western style.	
LSJZ3-40	Building at 5, East Taiping Alley	Constructed in the 1930s, this courtyard building was the former residence of Jiang Jian, who was hailed as "the Mother of Wounded Soldiers and Orphans" by Deng Yingchao.	
LSJZ3-41	The Clinic of Hangzhou Watch Factory, at 18, Xiaoluosi Hill, Siyi Road	Constructed in the early 1920s, it is a 2-story building in wood and brick-clad, reflecting the evolution of contemporary architecture.	
LSJZ3-42	Residences at 30, and 32 Dwelling houses at Old Site of Fanshu Office	Constructed in the 1920s, both of the houses are traditional courtyard-style buildings, reflecting the evolution of contemporary urban architecture.	
LSJZ3-43	The Library of Party School of Hangzhou CPC Committee	This reinforced concrete building was constructed in the 1940s, reflecting the contemporary revival of traditional architecture in decoration.	
LSJZ3-44	Building at 497, Zhongshan Road (S)	Constructed in the 1930s, it reflects the tendency to decorate traditional commercial buildings with a hybrid Western-style storefront.	
LSJZ3-45	Building Cluster at Yanchunli Alley	These buildings were constructed in the 1930s, reflecting the evolution of the economic alley residences (popular in Guangdong Province).	
LSJZ3-46	Building Cluster at Yanguan Alley	Constructed in between the 1920s and 1950s, these dwelling villas reflect the evolution of contemporary architecture.	
LSJZ3-47	Building at 21, Anjiatang Community	Constructed in the 1930s, it is a courtyard villa, embodying the transition from traditional to contemporary style.	
LSJZ3-48	Old Yingchun Bridge	Reconstructed in 1763 during the Qing Dynasty, it is a single-hole stone arch bridge, also known as “small bridge”.	
LSJZ3-49	Old Qingchun Bridge	Reconstructed in the Qing Dynasty, it is a single-hole stone arch bridge by interlocking construction in Southern China.	
LSJZ3-50	Old Lingci Bridge	Reconstructed in 1795 during the Qing Dynasty, it is a typical single-hole stone arch bridge by interlocking construction in Southern China.	
LSJZ3-51	Muchan Jingshe Temple	Constructed in the 1930s, it is a courtyard-style nunnery building in wood and brick-clad, embodying the transition from traditional to contemporary style.	
LSJZ3-52	“Jiatao Xianguan” Villa at Baita Ling Area	This hybrid Western-style public building was constructed between 1911 and 1949, reflecting the evolution of contemporary architecture.	
LSJZ3-53	Buildings at 190, and 191, Dragonwell Scenic Area	Constructed between 1911 and 1949, these traditional timber structured civilian residences are typical in the evolution of suburban architectures.	
LSJZ3-54	Jiang's Residence at Dragonwell Scenic Area	Constructed between 1911 and 1949, it is a courtyard-style building in wood and brick-clad. It is a representative of the evolution of suburban architectures.	
LSJZ3-55	No.1 building in Qianjiang Sanatorium of Shanghai Railway Bureau	Constructed in the 1950s, this public building reflects the exploration of combining native and foreign forms.	
LSJZ3-56	Shenwei Quan's Commercial Transfer Station	Constructed in the late Qing Dynasty, this traditional courtyard-style wooden building is representative of "shop in front, house at back" riverside buildings in Xixing region.	
LSJZ3-57	No.175,183, Xixing Road	Constructed in the late Qing Dynasty, this traditional courtyard-style wooden building is representative of civilian residences in Xixing region.	
LSJZ3-58	Yu's Residence at Xixing Road	Constructed in the late Qing Dynasty, this traditional courtyard-style wooden building is representative of civilian residences in Xixing region.	
LSJZ3-59	Tang's Residence at Xixing Road	Constructed in the late Qing Dynasty, this traditional courtyard-style wooden building is representative of "shop in front, house at back" riverside buildings in Xixing region.	
LSJZ3-60	Sun's Residence at Xixing Road	Constructed in the late Qing Dynasty, this traditional courtyard-style wooden building is representative of "shop in front, house at back" riverside buildings in Xixing region.	
LSJZ3-61	Building at 112, Guanhe Road	Constructed in the late Qing Dynasty, this traditional courtyard-style wooden building is representative of "shop in front, house at back" riverside buildings in Xixing region.	
LSJZ3-62	Buildings at 102,103, and 104, Guanhe Road	Constructed in the late Qing Dynasty, this traditional courtyard-style wooden building is representative of "shop in front, house at back" riverside buildings in Xixing region. Formerly it served as a commercial transfer station.	
LSJZ3-63	Yongxi Villa	Constructed in the late Qing Dynasty, this traditional courtyard-style wooden building is representative of large-scale civilian residences in Changhe region.	
LSJZ3-64	Shenyou Tang Villa	Constructed in the late Qing Dynasty, this traditional courtyard-style wooden building is representative of large-scale civilian residences in Changhe region.	
LSJZ3-65	No.10, Shanxiali Alley	Constructed in the late Qing Dynasty, this traditional courtyard-style wooden building is representative of large-scale civilian residences in Changhe region.	
LSJZ3-66	Zhouer Villa	Constructed in the late Qing Dynasty, this traditional courtyard-style wooden building consists of two side-by-side courtyards in the north and south direction, typical of residence in Changhe region.	
LSJZ3-67	Part One of Zhongxiandi	Constructed in the late Qing Dynasty, this traditional courtyard-style wooden building is representative of large-scale civilian residences in Changhe region.	
LSJZ3-68	Juzhi’an Villa	Constructed in the late Qing Dynasty, this traditional courtyard-style wooden building is representative of large-scale civilian residences in Changhe region.	
LSJZ3-69	Kong's Family Villa	Constructed in the Qing Dynasty at Linpu Town, it was known as Kong's family complex. There were more than 200 rooms, some of which were destroyed in 1940 by Japanese army.	
LSJZ3-70	Qing-Dynasty Building at Machetou Village, Jingshan Town, Yuhang District	Also known as “Zhang’s family Complex”, it is representative of large-scale courtyard-style civilian residences in Yuhang region.	
