= Cultural Properties of Mozambique =

The Cultural Properties of Mozambique are protected and promoted in accordance with Law 10/88 of 1988 concerning tangible and intangible properties relating to the cultural heritage of Mozambique (bens materiais e imateriais do património cultural moçambicano). Article 3 defines eight classes of movable cultural properties and four classes of immovable cultural properties: monuments (monumentos), groups of buildings (conjuntos os grupos de edifícios), sites (locais ou sitios), and natural elements (elementos naturais); those classed as património cultural are of exceptional significance and are afforded special state protection.

== Cultural Patrimony ==
Cultural properties classed as património cultural include the following:

Site	Official name	Location	Date	Comments	Coordinates	Designation	Image
Casa dos Azulejos	idem	Maputo		first town hall in city from 1901-1947		Monumento	
Palácio da Ponta Vermelha	id.	Maputo		residence of the President		Monumento	
Casa de Ferro	id.	Maputo	late C19	Pre fabricated in Belgium by Société des Forges d’Aiseau to patents by Joseph Danly		Monumento	
Fort Nossa Senhora da Conceição de Lourenço Marques	Fortaleza de Nossa Senhora da Conceição	Maputo	late C18	Portuguese fortress		Monumento	
Pott Building	Prédio Pott	Maputo		in ruins		Monumento	
National Press	Imprensa Nacional	Maputo	1887	Ngungunyane imprisoned inside		Monumento	
Maputo Central Railway Station	Estação Central dos Caminhos de Ferro	Maputo	1908	opened in 1910; replacement for that inaugurated by Paul Kruger in 1895		Monumento	
World War I Monument	Monumento da I Guerra Mundial	Maputo				Monumento	
Statue of Eduardo Mondlane	Estátua de Eduardo Mondlane	Maputo		first president of the Mozambican Liberation Front		Monumento	
Statue of Samora Machel	Estátua de Samora Moisés Machel	Maputo		president of the Mozambican Liberation Front		Monumento	
Mozambican Heroes Square	Praça dos Heróis Moçambicanos	Maputo		dedicated to the heroic figures of the Mozambican War of Independence		Monumento	

== See also ==
- History of Mozambique
- Culture of Mozambique
- List of heritage registers
- UNESCO General History of Africa
