= Register of the National Estate =

Heritage register in Australia

- Type: Natural and cultural heritage register
- Country: Australia
- Status: Closed
- Years: 1976 – February 2007; (Phased out from 2003; Register continued until 2012, but no new places added after 2007)
- Replaced by: Australian National Heritage List; Commonwealth Heritage List
- Compiled by: Commonwealth of Australia via the: Australian Heritage Commission (1976 – 2003); Australian Heritage Council (2003 – 2007)

The Register of the National Estate was a heritage register that listed natural and cultural heritage places in Australia. Phasing out of the register began in 2003, when the Australian National Heritage List and the Commonwealth Heritage List were created. By 2007, the Register had been replaced by them, and by various state and territory heritage registers. Places listed on the Register remain in a non-statutory archive and are still able to be viewed via the National Heritage Database.

== History ==
The register was initially compiled between 1976 and 2003 by the Australian Heritage Commission, after which the register was maintained by the Australian Heritage Council. 13,000 places were listed.

The expression "national estate" was first used by the British architect Clough Williams-Ellis, and reached Australia in the 1970s. It was incorporated into the Australian Heritage Commission Act 1975 and was used to describe a collection of buildings and sites that were worthy of preservation for a variety of reasons. It covered natural environments as well as European history and Aboriginal culture.

In 2003 the Australian Heritage Commission Act 1975, which had established the RNE, was repealed. In its place the Environment Protection and Biodiversity Conservation Act 1999 (EPBC Act) and the Australian Heritage Council Act 2003 provided for a new system of heritage protection for nationally significant places. In 2006 the EPBC Act and the Australian Heritage Council Act 2003 were amended to freeze the RNE, and to allow five years to phase out statutory references to the RNE. As a result of these changes:

- On 1 January 2004, the Australian Heritage Council took over responsibility for the RNE from the former Australian Heritage Commission.
- On 19 February 2007, the database was frozen; no more additions or removals of places were allowed.
- On 19 February 2012, all references to the RNE were removed from the legislation.

In February 2012, the Register was replaced by the Australian National Heritage List for places of outstanding heritage value for Australia and the Commonwealth Heritage List for heritage places that are owned or controlled by the Commonwealth of Australia, together with a collection of state and territory heritage registers most of which had been in existence for many years. The RNE is maintained on a non-statutory basis as a publicly available archive and educational resource.

== Listing process ==
Anyone could suggest that a certain site should be listed on the Register of the National Estate. A nomination form was provided and was then submitted to an expert group for evaluation. If a place was accepted for listing, the nomination was declared in the Commonwealth Gazette and newspapers. The Heritage Council eventually made a decision after the public has had time to comment and raise possible objections. The listing, if it took place, was based on an assessment of the values of the nominated place, whether "aesthetic, historic, scientific, or social significance, or other special value".

A listing on the Register required that a Commonwealth Minister or authority should not take any course of action that would adversely affect the listed subjects unless there was no alternative; in the latter case, the Minister was obliged to take steps to minimise any effect on the listed subject. The listing did not impose any legal obligations on private owners, companies, State governments or local governments. The Australian Heritage Council had to be consulted if any government wanted to take a course of action that might have an adverse effect on a listed subject. The Council itself could not make decisions on a proposed course of action; such decisions were made by the Federal Minister or the relevant authority contemplating the course of action.

== Criteria ==
Evaluation of nominated places was based on the following criteria:

=== Criterion A ===
Its importance in the course, or pattern, of Australia's natural or cultural history

- A.1 Importance in the evolution of Australian flora, fauna, landscapes or climate.
- A.2 Importance in maintaining existing processes or natural systems at the regional or national scale.
- A.3 Importance in exhibiting unusual richness or diversity of flora, fauna, landscapes or cultural features.
- A.4 Importance for association with events, developments or cultural phases which have had a significant role in the human occupation and evolution of the nation, State, region or community.

=== Criterion B ===
Its possession of uncommon, rare or endangered aspects of Australia's natural or cultural history

- B.1 Importance for rare, endangered or uncommon flora, fauna, communities, ecosystems, natural landscapes or phenomena, or as a wilderness.
- B.2 Importance in demonstrating a distinctive way of life, custom, process, land-use, function or design no longer practised, in danger of being lost, or of exceptional interest

=== Criterion C ===
Its potential to yield information that will contribute to an understanding of Australia's natural or cultural history

- C.1 Importance for information contributing to a wider understanding of Australian natural history, by virtue of its use as a research site, teaching site, type locality, reference or benchmark site.
- C.2 Importance for information contributing to a wider understanding of the history of human occupation of Australia.

=== Criterion D ===
Its importance in demonstrating the principal characteristics of: (i) a class of Australia's natural or cultural places; or (ii) a class of Australia's natural or cultural environments

- D.1 Importance in demonstrating the principal characteristics of the range of landscapes, environments or ecosystems, the attributes of which identify them as being characteristic of their class.
- D.2 Importance in demonstrating the principal characteristics of the range of human activities in the Australian environment (including way of life, philosophy, custom, process, land use, function, design or technique).

=== Criterion E ===
Its importance in exhibiting particular aesthetic characteristics valued by a community or cultural group

- E.1 Importance for a community for aesthetic characteristics held in high esteem or otherwise valued by the community.

=== Criterion F ===
Its importance in demonstrating a high degree of creative or technical achievement at a particular period

- F.1 Importance for its technical, creative, design or artistic excellence, innovation or achievement.

=== Criterion G ===
Its strong or special associations with a particular community or cultural group for social, cultural or spiritual reasons

- G.1 Importance as a place highly valued by a community for reasons of religious, spiritual, symbolic, cultural, educational, or social associations.

=== Criterion H ===
Its special association with the life or works of a person, or group of persons, of importance in Australia's natural or cultural history

- H.1 Importance for close associations with individuals whose activities have been significant within the history of the nation, State or region.

== See also ==
- List of heritage registers
- Annie Forsyth Wyatt
