= List of fourth batch of declared historic buildings in Hangzhou =

Declared historic buildings of Hangzhou are districts, artifacts or buildings legally declared to be "protected". According to the "Regularations of historic districts and historic buildings in Hangzhou" effectivated from 1 January 2005, historic buildings are those artifacts or districts that have lasted more than 50 years, and of significant values for history, science, and art study. In Hangzhou, declaring a historic house requires consulting the urban planning administration bureau, and the real estate administration bureau.

Contents: Batches of Hangzhou declared historic buildings / See also: Hangzhou
- First batch
- Second batch
- Third batch
- Fourth batch
- Fifth batch

As of 31 June 2011, there are 287 declared historic buildings in Hangzhou, proclaimed as 5 batches.[17] In the near future, it is going to issue the sixth batch which includes 51 historic houses.

== List of fourth batch of declared historic buildings in Hangzhou ==
52 buildings were declared to be the fourths batch of historic houses in Hangzhou, in August 2008. The following information is provided by Real Estate Admiustration Bureau & Research Institute for Historic buildings in Hangzhou.

No.	Name	Notes/References	Photographs
LSJZ4-1	Houses at Dasanli Alley	Constructed between 1911 and 1949, they are typical stone-arched gate parallel residential buildings, consisting of 1-6 at Dasanli Alley and 5-6 at Dixinli Alley.	
LSJZ4-2	Yin Lu Villa (Lu Mingui's Former Residence)	Constructed between 1911 and 1949, this courtyard villa reflects the process of applying the Western forms to traditional Chinese architectural system.	
LSJZ4-3	Tiandefang House	Constructed between 1911 and 1949, this parallel residential building reflects the evolution of contemporary urban residence.	
LSJZ4-4	Building Cluster at Xuanshouli	Constructed between 1911 and 1949, the cluster of parallel residential buildings, ranging from 1-12, to 12-16 of Xuanshouli Alley, reflects the evolution of contemporary urban residence.	
LSJZ4-5	Villa at 7, Fangguyuan	Constructed between 1911 and 1949, this courtyard villa reflects the evolution of contemporary urban residence.	
LSJZ4-6	Building Cluster at Huixingli	The cluster, including 1-2, 1-3, 1-6, and 1-7, at Huixing Road, reflects the characteristics of the evolution from vernacular architecture to contemporary urban residence.	
LSJZ4-7	Building at 4, Kaiyuan Alley (S1)	Constructed between 1911 and 1949, this courtyard house reflects the evolution of contemporary urban residence.	
LSJZ4-8	Former Site of Boji Hospital	Constructed between 1911 and 1949, this courtyard house reflects the evolution of contemporary urban residence.	
LSJZ4-9	Qiu's Residence at Guangfuli	Constructed between 1911 and 1949, this courtyard house reflects the evolution of contemporary urban residence.	
LSJZ4-10	Ye's Residence at Guangfuli	Constructed between 1911 and 1949, it is a villa in wood and brick-clad, designed by contemporary native architect for himself.	
LSJZ4-11	Building at 337, Zhongshan Road (M)	Constructed between 1911 and 1949, this commercial and residential building in wood structure reflects the evolution of contemporary urban architecture.	
LSJZ4-12	Building at 11, Zhongshan Road (M)	Constructed in the early 20th century, this commercial and residential building is in wood and brick-clad, reflecting the evolution of contemporary urban architecture.	
LSJZ4-13	Former Site of a Branch Store of Guangheshun Baoyoufang	Constructed between 1911 and 1949, this commercial building reflects the history of combining Western form with contemporary urban architecture.	
LSJZ4-14	Buildings at 81, and 83, Zhongshan Road (M)	Constructed between 1911 and 1949, the two commercial buildings reflect the history of combining Western form with contemporary urban architecture.	
LSJZ4-15	Buildings at 18, 18-1, and 20, Zhongshan Road (M)	Constructed between 1911 and 1949, these commercial and residential buildings reflect the history of combining Western form with contemporary urban architecture.	
LSJZ4-16	Buildings at 23, and 25, Zhongshan Road (M)	Constructed in the early 20th century, these commercial wooden buildings reflect the evolution of contemporary urban architecture.	
LSJZ4-17	Buildings at 45, and 47, Zhongshan Road (M)	Constructed between 1911 and 1949, these commercial buildings in wood and brick-clad reflect the blending of the Western style with local ones for contemporary urban architecture.	
LSJZ4-18	Former Site of Yongtai Department Store	Constructed in the late Qing Dynasty, this courtyard villa reflects the process of combining the Western-style gable with the old-style commercial architecture in contemporary times.	
LSJZ4-19	Former Site of Post Office Branch at Qinghefang	Constructed between 1911 and 1949, it is a commercial building in wood and brick-clad, reflecting the blending of the Western style with local one for urban commercial architecture.	
LSJZ4-20	Former Site of Yitaichang Cloth Store	Constructed in the late 19th century, the commercial and residential building in traditional courtyard style is one of few remaining heritages during contemporary urban development.	
LSJZ4-21	Building at 27, Dajing Alley	Constructed in the early 20th century, this commercial building reflects the evolution of contemporary urban architecture.	
LSJZ4-22	Buildings at 29, and 31, Dajing Alley	Constructed in the early 20th century, these commercial buildings in timber structure reflect the evolution of contemporary urban architecture.	
LSJZ4-23	Buildings at 12, 14, 16, and 16-2, Zhongshan Road (M)	Constructed in the late Qing Dynasty, these courtyard houses reflect the evolution of commercial-and-residential-combined architecture in contemporary cities.	
LSJZ4-24	Villa at 36-3, Yanguan Alley	Constructed between 1911 and 1949, the villa reflects the evolution of contemporary urban residence.	
LSJZ4-25	House at 8, Sanmei'an Alley	Constructed between 1911 and 1949, the civilian residential house reflects the transition from traditional to contemporary style.	
LSJZ4-26	Villa at 33, Doufu'erqiao	Constructed in the first three decades of the 20th century, this tradition courtyard villa reflects the transition from traditional to contemporary style.	
LSJZ4-27	6-3 at Xue'erhexia	Constructed between late 19th century to the early 20th century, this building, used to be the Yiyuan Ginseng Store, reflects the evolution of contemporary architecture.	
LSJZ4-28	Changqiao Villa	Constructed between 1911 and 1949, the villa reflects the evolution of contemporary residential architecture.	
LSJZ4-29	Villa at 159, Huansha Road	Constructed in the early 20th century, the villa reflects the evolution of contemporary residential architecture.	
LSJZ4-30	Xuanlu Villa	Constructed in the early 20th century, the villa reflects the evolution of contemporary residential architecture.	
LSJZ4-31	Building Cluster at Hangda Xincun Residential Quarter	Constructed in the 1950s, this cluster is a department-style residence, including buildings No. 23, and No.24, reflecting the evolution of contemporary architecture.	
LSJZ4-32	DujiaBridge	Constructed in the Qing Dynasty, this single-span beam slab-stone bridge reflects the traditional style and craft of stone-beam bridge in the Southern China.	
LSJZ4-33	Sheng's Residence at Xixing Street	Constructed in the Qing Dynasty, the traditional courtyard-style architecture in timber structure reflects the traditional layout and form of the vernacular residence in Xixing area.	
LSJZ4-34	Buildings at 105, 106, ant 107, Guanhe Road	Constructed in the late Qing Dynasty, this traditional courtyard-style wooden building is a representative of "shop in front, house at back" buildings in Xixing region.	
LSJZ4-35	Yu Renyuan's Guotanghang	Constructed in the late Qing Dynasty, this traditional courtyard-style wooden building reflects the unique history of commercial transfer stations in Xixing area.	
LSJZ4-36	Wang's Residence at Xixing Street	Constructed in the late Qing Dynasty, this traditional courtyard-style wooden building is a representative of civialian residential buildings in Xixing region.	
LSJZ4-37	Ye Hanxiang's Commercial Transfer Station	Constructed in the late Qing Dynasty, the traditional courtyard house in timber structure reflects the traditional layout and form of vernacular architecture in Xixing area.	
LSJZ4-38	Building at 5, Dafudi	Constructed in the late Qing Dynasty, the traditional courtyard house in timber structure reflects the traditional layout and form of vernacular architecture in Changhe area.	
LSJZ4-39	Buildings at 17, 22, 24, and 29, Shanxiali Alley	Constructed in the late Qing Dynasty, these traditional courtyard-style wooden buildings reflect the traditional layout of "store in the front and residence in the back" of the vernacular residence in Changhe area.	
LSJZ4-40	Small Hall of Guangyutang	Constructed in the Qing Dynasty, this traditional courtyard-style wooden building reflects the traditional layout and form of vernacular residence in the Qing Dynasty in Changhe area.	
LSJZ4-41	Local Bank at Xiaoqiao Alley	Constructed in the Qing Dynasty, this wooden building reflects the traditional layout and form of the vernacular architecture in the Qing Dynasty in Changhe area.	
LSJZ4-42	4 at Xiaoqiao Alley	Constructed in the Qing Dynasty, this traditional courtyard-style residence in timber structure reflects the vernacular architecture in the Qing Dynasty in Changhe area.	
LSJZ4-43	Part Four of Zhongxiandi	Constructed in the early Qing Dynasty, this traditional courtyard-style residence in timber structure reflects the typical layout of the vernacular residence in the Qing Dynasty in Changhe area.	
LSJZ4-44	78 at Shuigouyan	Constructed in the late Qing Dynasty, this traditional courtyard-style architecture in timber structure reflects the traditional layout and form of vernacular residence in Changhe area.	
LSJZ4-45	Yuantai Villa	Constructed in the Qing Dynasty, this traditional courtyard-style architecture in timber structure reflects the traditional layout and form of vernacular residence in Changhe area.	
LSJZ4-46	Building at 12, Yuewantan	Constructed in the late Qing Dynasty, this traditional courtyard-style architecture in timber structure reflects the traditional layout and form of vernacular residence in Changhe area.	
LSJZ4-47	Shigong Villa	Constructed in the Qing Dynasty, this traditional courtyard-style architecture in timber structure reflects the traditional layout and form of vernacular residence in Changhe area.	
LSJZ4-48	Former Residence of Lai Xiaoqin's (Part Two of Zhongxiandi)	Constructed in the late Qing Dynasty, this traditional courtyard-style architecture in timber structure reflects the traditional layout and form of vernacular residence in Changhe area.	
LSJZ4-49	Building at 19, Xiaoyouli	Constructed between 1911 and 1949, this traditional courtyard-style architecture in timber structure reflects the evolution of contemporary urban residence.	
LSJZ4-50	Buildings at 220, 222, 224, and 226, Wangjiang Road	Constructed in the Qing Dynasty, these traditional courtyard-style architectures in timber structure reflect the layout and form of contemporary urban residence.	
LSJZ4-51	Buildings at 3, 17, and 19, Hengjixiang Alley	Constructed in the period of late 19th century to early 20th century, these traditional courtyard-style architectures reflect the layout and form of contemporary urban residence.	
LSJZ4-52	Buildings at 1, and 2, Hengjixiang Alley	Constructed between 1911 and 1949, this traditional courtyard-style architecture in timber structure reflects the evolution of contemporary urban residence.	
