= List of first batch of declared historic buildings in Hangzhou =

Declared historic buildings' of Hangzhou are districts, artifacts or buildings legally declared to be "protected". According to the "Regularations of historic districts and historic buildings in Hangzhou" effectivated from 1 January 2005, historic buildings are those artifacts or districts that have lasted more than 50 years, and of significant values for history, science, and art study. In Hangzhou, declaring a historic building requires consulting the urban planning administration bureau, and the real estate administration bureau.

As of 31 June 2011, there are 287 declared historic buildings in Hangzhou, proclaimed as 5 batches.[17] In the near future, it is going to issue the sixth batch which includes 51 historic houses.

Contents: Batches of Hangzhou declared historic buildings / See also: Hangzhou
- First batch
- Second batch
- Third batch
- Fourth batch
- Fifth batch

75 buildings were declared to be the first batch of historic buildings in Hangzhou, in May 2004. The following information is provided by Real Estate Admiustration Bureau & Research Institute for Historic buildings in Hangzhou.

No.	Name	Notes/References	Photographs
LSJZ1-1	Yuanmaoli Contemporary Building Cluster	Constructed between 1911 and 1949, they are three stone-arched gate houses with plain-brick structures in parallel, marked as Maoyuanli Alley 1, Alley 2 and Alley 3. They are representatives of the Shikumen alleys of contemporary Hangzhou.	Yuanmaoli Contemporary Building Cluster
LSJZ1-2	Jiang's Mansion	Constructed in the late 1920s, it was the former residence of Jiang Yizhi, an official and businessman in the Republican era. It is a four-story building including underground floor with five rooms in parallel. The building is of typical Western style.	Jiang's Mansion
LSJZ1-3	The Former Site of Shi Guanyin Ge Temple	Constructed during the Qing dynasty, it is a traditional Chinese rectangular courtyard. The building is representative of the small-size temples of Hangzhou during the late Qing dynasty.	The Former Site of Shi Guanyin Ge Temple
LSJZ1-4	The Former Site of Xianning Temple	Constructed in the Five Dynasties period, it is one of the famous temples in the area of Banshan. The temple was reconstructed between 1911 and 1949.	The Former Site of Xianning Temple
LSJZ1-5	Villa at 30, Jiaochang Road	Constructed between 1911 and 1949, it is a two-story villa with slope-roof in brick-stone structure, the typical villa style.	Villa at 30, Jiaochang Road
LSJZ1-6	Hongmenju Villa Cluster	It is made up of three buildings, marked as Hongmenju 65, 66, 67. The building 65 was Constructed between 1911 and 1949, while the building 66, and 67 were built afterward.	Hongmenju Villa Cluster
LSJZ1-7	Yiyun Jilu Villa	Constructed between 1911 and 1949, it is a three-story villa featuring a blending of Chinese and the Western styles, also named Mingjian Lou.	Yiyun Jilu Villa
LSJZ1-8	Civilian Residence at 78, Kaiyuan Road	Constructed between 1911 and 1949, it is a typical civilian residence in wood and brick-clad with slope roof.	Civilian Residence at 78, Kaiyuan Road
LSJZ1-9	Double-sword Building	Constructed in the 1930s, it is a two-story Western-style villa with three rooms in parallel.	Double-sword Building
LSJZ1-10	Villa at 6, Jiurenhecun	Constructed between 1911 and 1949, it is two-story brick-stone structured villa with slope-roof, the typical villa style at that time.	Villa at 6, Jiurenhecun
LSJZ1-11	Villa at 9, Jiurenhecun	Constructed between 1911 and 1949, it is a masonry-lined villa, also named Kelu.	Villa at 9, Jiurenhecun
LSJZ1-12	Civilian Residence at 26, Shiwukui Alley	Constructed between 1911 and 1949, it is a two-story building in timber structure and a typical traditional civilian residence in Hangzhou.	Civilian Residence at 26, Shiwukui Alley
LSJZ1-13	Civilian Residence at 31, Shiwukui Alley	Constructed between 1911 and 1949, it is a building in timber structure with a courtyard.	Civilian Residence at 31, Shiwukui Alley
LSJZ1-14	Civilian Residence at 32–33, Shiwukui Alley	Constructed between 1911 and 1949, it is a two-story building in timber structure with a back courtyard. It is the typical traditional civilian residence in Hangzhou.	Civilian Residence at 32–33, Shiwukui Alley
LSJZ1-15	Civilian Residence at 66, Yuanbaoxin	Constructed in the Qing dynasty, it is a two-story building in wood and brick-clad. It was a Buddhist nunnery. Now it serves as a civilian residence.	Civilian Residence at 66, Yuanbaoxin
LSJZ1-16	Civilian Residence at 5, Cuijia Alley	Constructed between 1911 and 1949, it is a civilian residence in timber structure with slope roof. It consists of two halls.	Civilian Residence at 5, Cuijia Alley
LSJZ1-17	Civilian Residence at 16, Youdian Road	Constructed between 1911 and 1949, it is a two-story brick-stone building with delicate slope-roofs.	Civilian Residence at 16 Youdian Road
LSJZ1-18	Qiu's Mansion	Constructed in the 1930s by the Qius, it is a blue-brick building with traditional roof, exquisite brick carvings on the top of the wall, and round corridor in the east port of the villa.	Qiu's Mansion
LSJZ1-19	Yi Lu Villa	Constructed between 1911 and 1949, it is a civilian residence villa made up of two parallel parts and two halls. The outside of the villa is in plain-brick. By the eastern wall corner stands a stone tablet engraved with Yilujie.	Yi Lu Villa
LSJZ1-20	Xueshifang Villa Cluster	Constructed between 1911 and 1949, they were 4 brick-stone structured villas in steel color. Today only two of the four on the east part still remain.	Xueshifang Villa Cluster
LSJZ1-21	Civilian Residence at 3, Xueshi Road	Constructed between 1911 and 1949, it is a building with two-story colonnades, featuring a blending of the Chinese and the Western styles.	Civilian Residence at 3, Xueshi Road
LSJZ1-22	Building at 8, Yuewangxincun	Constructed between 1911 and 1949, it is a three-story building with slope-roof and plain-brick. There is a garden for the first floor residence.	Building at 8, Yuewangxincun
LSJZ1-23	Civilian Residence at 16–1, Huanchenglu Road (E)	Constructed between 1911 and 1949, it is a two-story building with three halls and four parts in parallel. There are two old wells in the yard of the building.	Civilian Residence at 16–1, Huanchenglu Road (E).
LSJZ1-24	Villa at 37, Anji Road	Constructed between 1911 and 1949, it is a two-story Western-style villa. Its wall is constructed from greenish bricks and the floor, stairs, armrests, balusters, windows and doors are constructed from wood.	Villa at 37, Anji Road
LSJZ1-25	Villa at 35, Anji Road	Constructed between 1911 and 1949, it is a two-story Western style villa with an attic featuring slope- roof. The building has one layer in the width of 10m. Its wall is constructed from greenish bricks.	Villa at 35, Anji Road
LSJZ1-26	Civilian Residence at Mashijie Street	The building marked as Mashijie 175, 176 and 177 is a three-story villa with slope-roof, in brick-and-concrete structure. They are constructed between 1911 and 1949.	Civilian Residence at Mashijie Street
LSJZ1-27	Civilian Residence at 226, Yan’an Road	Constructed between 1911 and 1949, it is a two-story Western-style villa with slope-roof, and brick-and-concrete structure.	Civilian Residence at 226, Yan’an Road
LSJZ1-28	Civilian Residence of the Qing dynasty	Constructed in the Qing dynasty, it is a two-story building with slope-roof and in timber structure. There are wood carvings, square posts and pillar stones.	Civilian Residence of the Qing dynasty
LSJZ1-29	Civilian Residences in Yonganli Alley	Constructed between 1911 and 1949, they are two-story buildings in wood and brick-clad. There are many dormer windows with various sizes.	Civilian Residences in Yonganli Alley
LSJZ1-30	Yueyuan		Yueyuan
LSJZ1-31	The Buildings of Hangzhou Normal College for Preschool Education	Constructed in 1953, these three-story brick-concrete buildings of shape L, marked with 1 through No.3, form a triangle layout.	The Buildings of Hangzhou Normal College for Preschool Education
LSJZ1-32	National Warehouse of Silk	Constructed in 1951, these four three-story wood and brick-clad buildings are in plain-brick style.	National Warehouse of Silk
LSJZ1-33	Sichengtang Church	Constructed between 1911 and 1949, it is one of the earliest and largest Christian churches in Hangzhou. It features the blending of the Chinese and the Western styles. To honor the first Chinese clerk Zhang Chengzhai, the church is named after Sichengtang.	Sichengtang Church
LSJZ1-34	The Former Residence of Huang Fu	Constructed between 1911 and 1949, it is a two-story Western-style villa. Its former owner was Huang Fu, an important Kuomintang official in China.	The Former Residence of Huang Fu
LSJZ1-35	The Former Residence of Guo Linshuang	Constructed between 1911 and 1949, it is a Western style two-story villa in wood and brick-clad. It was the residence of Guo Linshuang, a well-known entrepreneur in Shanghai.	The Former Residence of Guo Linshuang
LSJZ1-36	Shuangmiao Temple		双庙
LSJZ1-37	The Former Site of Zhejiang Telecommunications Bureau	It is one of the few remaining representative public works constructed between 1911 and 1949 in Hangzhou.	The Former Site of Zhejiang Telecommunications Bureau
LSJZ1-38	The Former Site of Postal Service Bureau of Zhejiang Province	Constructed between 1911 and 1949, the building features British classical style. It is one of the earliest public buildings that remain in Hangzhou.	The Former Site of Postal Service Bureau of Zhejiang Province
LSJZ1-39	Memorial Pavilion to Dr. Sun Yat-sen		Memorial Pavilion to Dr. Sun Yat-sen
LSJZ1-40	Dengxin Alley Building Cluster	Constructed between 1911 and 1949, the four buildings of different shapes are standing in parallel. They were owned by Wang Zhennan, the cousin of Chiang Kai-shek - the former president of the Republic of China.	Dengxin Alley Building Cluster
LSJZ1-41	Civilian Residences at 43, Liangdaoshan	Constructed between 1911 and 1949, the building has a small garden hosting a stone tablet of Zhezhongyilu engraved in 1893 during the reign of the Guangxu Emperor.	Civilian Residences at 43, Liangdaoshan
LSJZ1-42	The Former Site of Manao Temple	The temple was constructed in 946 A.C., destroyed by the Taiping Heavenly Kingdom, and renovated at the end of the Qing dynasty. It is the representative temple garden in Hangzhou.	The Former Site of Manao Temple
LSJZ1-43	Villa at 6, Shihan Road	Constructed between 1911 and 1949, the three-story villa is with plain bricks and red wooden windows. Now it serves as a residential building.	Villa at 6, Shihan Road
LSJZ1-44	Villa at 182, Nanshan Road	Constructed between 1911 and 1949, it was a four-story structure in plain-brick style. When the building was renovated, the wall was painted green, hence also named Green Villa afterward.	Villa at 182, Nanshan Road
LSJZ1-45	Villa at 214, Nanshan Road	Constructed between 1911 and 1949, it is a two-story villa with slope-roof and in plain-brick style.	Villa at 214, Nanshan Road
LSJZ1-46	Villa at 210, Nanshan Road	Constructed between 1911 and 1949, it is a two-story villa with slope-roof and in plain-brick style.	Villa at 210, Nanshan Road
LSJZ1-47	Villa at 206, Nanshan Road	Constructed between 1911 and 1949, it is a two-story villa with slope-roof and in plain-brick style.	Villa at 206, Nanshan
LSJZ1-48	Villa at 204, Nanshan Road	Constructed between 1911 and 1949, it is a two-story villa with slope-roof and in plain-brick style.	Villa at 204, Nanshan Road
LSJZ1-49	Heng Lu Villa	Constructed between 1911 and 1949, it is a three-story villa with slope-roof and in plain-brick style.	Heng Lu Villa
LSJZ1-50	The Former Residence of Mao Yisheng	Constructed in the 1930s, it is a two-story brick villa with slope-roof and in plain-brick style, featuring a blending of the Chinese and the Western styles.	The Former Residence of Mao Yisheng
LSJZ1-51	Xing Lu Villa	Constructed in early Republic of China, also named Zhuyinlou, it is an imitation of Western-style villa.	Xing Lu Villa
LSJZ1-52	Yuxiu Buddhist Nunnery	Constructed in early Republic of China, it was a private Buddhist Nunnery.	Yuxiu Buddhist Nunnery
LSJZ1-53	Baoqing Villa	Constructed between 1911 and 1949, it is a three-story Western-style building villa in wood and brick-clad. It served as the fourth pavilion of the Industry Hall of the West Lake Expo in 1929.	Baoqing Villa
LSJZ1-54	Wang's Mansion	Situated against hills and facing the West Lake, it is one of the outstanding representative buildings of contemporary China. It was constructed between 1911 and 1949, and features a blending of the Chinese and the Western styles.	Wang's Mansion
LSJZ1-55	Chunrun Lu Villa	Constructed between 1911 and 1949, it is a villa consisting of two Western-style buildings.	Chunrun Lu Villa
LSJZ1-56	Run Lu Villa	Situated against hills and beside the West Lake, it is a two-story villa with 10m-wide rooms Constructed between 1911 and 1949.	Run Lu Villa
LSJZ1-57	The Former Site of Zhaoxian Temple	The temple was constructed in the Tang dynasty but destroyed at the end of the Yuan dynasty. In the 15th year of the reign of the Kangxi Emperor in the Qing dynasty, Qigang, a Buddhist monk collected alms and rebuilt the temple. It is a traditional Chinese big-roof temple with three palaces.	The Former Site of Zhaoxian
LSJZ1-58	Xi Lu Villa	Constructed between 1911 and 1949, it is a villa with a builtiful garden. The villa is made up of two buildings. The front one is a traditional big-roof villa with three rooms in parallel. The stairs at the back of the Villa lead to another two-story Western-style villa in wood and brick-clad with three rooms in parallel.	Xi Lu Villa
LSJZ1-59	Jiyi Villa	Constructed in1930s, it is a two-story Western-style building in wood and brick-clad.	Jiyi Villa
LSJZ1-60	Pan's Mansion	Also named Yi Lu, it is a two-story villa in brick-stone structure constructed between 1911 and 1949.	Pan's Mansion
LSJZ1-61	Villa at 76, Beishan Road	Constructed between 1911 and 1949, it is a two-story masonry-lined villa with traditional slope-roof.	Villa at 76, Beishan Road
LSJZ1-62	Sui Lu Villa	It is also known as Bao's Mansion. With the stone drum bench in the courtyard and the blue-brick archway at the entrance, the building features Chinese Linnan style.	Sui Lu Villa
LSJZ1-63	Villa at 95, Beishan Road	It was constructed between 1911 and 1949. The layout is square. It features big-slope roof and small tiles.	Villa at 95, Beishan Road
LSJZ1-64	The Old Site of Jiuzhizhai	Constructed between 1911 and 1949, it is a 2-3 story Western-style building in wood and brick-clad. Jiuzhizhai was founded in 1925, known as one of the “Three Zhais and Two Hes” food stores in Hangzhou.	The Old Site of Jiuzhizhai
LSJZ1-65	The Old Site of Baodashen	Constructed in the early 19th century, it is a two-hall building and is symmetric in its layout on the longitudinal axis.	The Old Site of Baodashen
LSJZ1-66	The Former Residence of Wu Jingzhai	Constructed between 1911 and 1949, it was the residence of Wu Jingzhai, a well-known figure of the old-style Chinese private banking services between the end of the Qing dynasty and the beginning of the Republic of China in Hanghzou.	The Former Residence of Wu Jingzhai
LSJZ1-67	The Former Site of Zhongde Maternity Clinic	Constructed between 1911 and 1949, it is a two-story traditional compound in wood and brick-clad with three halls and two courtyards.	The Former Site of Zhongde Maternity Clinic
LSJZ1-68	The Former Site of Zhuyangxin Plaster Store	Constructed in the Qing dynasty, it is a two-story building in timber structure. Zhuyangxin Plaster Store was founded 400 years ago during the reign of the Wanli Emperor in the Ming dynasty.	The Former Site of Zhuyangxin Plaster Store
LSJZ1-69	The Contemporary Building of Huimin Road	It is a three-story brick-stone structured villa with slope-roof, the typical villa style between 1911 and 1949.	The Contemporary Building of Huimin Road
LSJZ1-70	Civilian Residence at 98, Haier Alley		Civilian Residence at 98, Haier Alley
LSJZ1-71	The Former Residence of Du Yuesheng	Constructed between 1911 and 1949, its main body is a two-story building in wood and brick-clad. It was the former residence of Du Yuesheng, a notorious mob boss in Shanghai in the 1920s and 1930s.	The Former Residence of Du Yuesheng
LSJZ1-72	Pu Ti Jing She	The villa was Constructed in 1926, featuring in wood and brick-clad, the typical buildings of contemporary China.	Pu Ti Jing She
LSJZ1-73	Villa at 18, Geling Road	Also named Le Lu, it is constructed between 1911 and 1949.	Villa at 18, Geling Road
LSJZ1-74	Ru Lu Villa	Constructed between 1911 and 1949, it was owned by Lin Jiuru, the general manager of Zengyu Material Store in Shanghai, hence named Ru Lu Villa.	Ru Lu Villa
LSJZ1-75	Villa at 61, Pinghai Road	Constructed between 1911 and 1949, it is a two-story villa, also named Shi Lu.	Villa at 61, Pinghai Road
