= Patrimoni Cultural =

Patrimoni Cultural refers both to the cultural heritage of Andorra, and also to the Andorran government protection agency called by the same name (Departament de Patrimoni Cultural, or Department of Cultural Heritage).

The agency administers the national heritage sites of Andorra, including the Madriu-Perafita-Claror Valley, which is a World Heritage Site.

== See also ==
- Culture of Andorra
- List of heritage registers
- Monument d'interès cultural
