= FVH =

FVH may refer to:

- Franco-Vietnamese Hospital, a Vietnamese healthcare provider
- Friends of Vietnam Heritage, a Vietnamese heritage organization
