= 19 Jinchaidai Alley =

Historical building

Coordinates: 30°14′7.98″N 120°10′26.66″E

19 Jinchaidai Alley (simplified Chinese: 金钗袋巷19号; traditional Chinese: 金釵袋巷19號; pinyin: jīnchāidài xiàng 19-hào), in Shangcheng District, Hangzhou, Zhejiang, China, is a former residence constructed during the Qing dynasty, which was used during the Xinhai Revolution that led to the dynasty's collapse. Despite concerns over its historical significance, the building began to be demolished in 2010 despite its addition to the fifth batch of protected historical buildings in Hangzhou earlier that year, although its demolition was stopped by the city government's intervention. The building has now been renovated, and serves as part of the campus of the Jianlan Middle School's Lanxin Academy of Classical Learning, a private school in the city.

== Historical significance ==
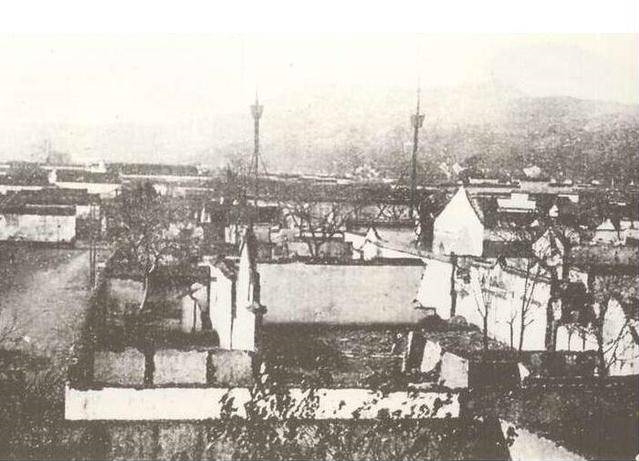
A photograph of Jinchaidai Alley from around the time of the Xinhai Revolution

19 Jinchaidai Alley served as the home of the Zhu family, one of whom was a government official, after its construction during the late-Qing dynasty. During the final years of the Qing dynasty, the building was involved in events relating to the Xinhai Revolution, being described as the last Xinhai Revolutionary site in the city by a local historian. Following the fall of the Qing and the creation of the Republic of China, the home was sold to various other families until its attempted demolition in 2010.

== Attempted demolition ==
In November 2008, plans for the reconstruction and expansion of a private school in Hangzhou were announced, which involved the demolition of buildings considered "dilapidated" to make way for an expansion to the school's campus, as well as for the construction of a larger parking area. Successive legislation was passed between 2008 and 2010 by the Hangzhou municipal government which supporting these changes, despite concerns by historians over the historical significance of some of the buildings that were planned to be destroyed. Even though 19 Jinchaidai Alley was documented to have been used during the Qing dynasty, it was listed in city government-approved assessment reports for the school's expansion as being "built in 1985".

In April 2010, 19 Jinchaidai Alley and forty-two other buildings were added to the list of historically protected buildings in Hangzhou by means of an extension of its fifth batch, acknowledging the buildings' importance historically in the city. In a notice released by the Hangzhou municipal government, it was stated that the Municipal Office for the Protection of Historical and Cultural Districts and Historical Buildings would be responsible "for the protection and management of historical buildings".

Despite 19 Jinchaidai being a historically protected building, its demolition began on in early-September 2010, which attracted crowds of people, and caused anger among historians. A joint letter to the Hangzhou city government was sent by a professor of the Urban Planning Department of Zhejiang University, Zhou Fuduo, and a local historian, Chen Hun, which explained how the school's project would involve the destruction of historically protected buildings.

During the demolition, a report on the building's destruction while being historically protected was made by CCTV. This report caused the city government to immediately halt the building's demolition due to public outcry and press coverage of the situation.

On November 21, the Hangzhou municipal government announced that it would disallow any further demolitions of historically protected sites, and that it would increase government subsidies for the repair of historically protected buildings in the future. 19 Jinchaidai Alley was repaired, and now serves as part of the campus of the private school it was originally intended to be demolished for, although it is now protected in its original form.
