= List of second batch of declared historic buildings in Hangzhou =

Declared historic buildings of Hangzhou, China, are districts, artifacts or buildings legally declared to be "protected". According to the "Regularations of historic districts and historic buildings in Hangzhou" effective from 1 January 2005, historic buildings are those artifacts or districts that have lasted more than 50 years, and of significant values for history, science, and art study. In Hangzhou, declaring a historic house requires consulting the urban planning administration bureau, and the real estate administration bureau.

Contents: Batches of Hangzhou declared historic buildings / See also: Hangzhou
- First batch
- Second batch
- Third batch
- Fourth batch
- Fifth batch

As of 31 June 2011, there are 287 declared historic buildings in Hangzhou, proclaimed as five batches. There are plans for a sixth batch that will include 51 historic houses.

== List of second batch of declared historic buildings in Hangzhou ==
47 buildings were declared to be the second batch of historic houses in Hangzhou, in July 2005. The following information is provided by Real Estate Admiustration Bureau & Research Institute for Historic buildings in Hang zhou.

No.	Name	Notes/References	Photographs
LSJZ2-1	Wufu Alley Building Cluster	Constructed in the 1920s, this cluster is an apartment-based alley residence.	
LSJZ2-2	Jiuxing Alley Building Cluster	Constructed in the 1920s, this joint building is of traditional residential style in the Southern China.	
LSJZ2-3	Villa at 147, Jianguo Road (S)	Constructed in the 1920s, the villa, also known as “Yang’s Residence”, is a Chinese traditional rectangular courtyard villa.	
LSJZ2-4	290 to 298 (Even Numbers), West Lake Avenue	Constructed in the 1920s, they are typical stone-arched gate buildings in plain-brick style.	
LSJZ2-5	224 to 236 (Even Numbers), West Lake Avenue	Constructed in the 1920s, they are typical stone-arched gate buildings in plain-brick style.	
LSJZ2-6	The Building at 26, Liangdaoshan Road	Constructed in the 1930s, this building, also known as Qiaohua Hall, was originally proprietary to the eminent doctor Wang in Hangzhou. In front of the building is the famous Shangbayan Well .	
LSJZ2-7	The Building at 52, Youdian Road	Constructed in the 1940s, this building, also called Qin Lu, was a luxury residence of Song Jisheng, the Chinese manager of Shanghai British-run Zhonghe Company.	
LSJZ2-8	The Building at 8, Youdian Road	Constructed in the 1920s, this courtyard-style residence has a winding corridor on its second floor.	
LSJZ2-9	The Building at No.2, Renhe Road	Constructed in the 1930s, it is a Western-style villa in wood and brick-clad.	
LSJZ2-10	The Building at 1, By West River	Constructed in the early 20th century, it is a civilian residence in wood and brick-clad.	
LSJZ2-11	Contemporary Building Cluster by Qingbo River	Constructed in the 1940s, it is composed of the former residences of Xiachao at 4 and No.8, and the former residence of Zhouyan at No.9.	
LSJZ2-12	Contemporary Building Cluster at Guangfuli Street	Constructed in the early 20th century, this courtyard-style complex consists of the buildings at 5 and 6, Guangfu St. and 19, Hehuachitou Alley.	
LSJZ2-13	The Building at 47, Shiwukui Alley	Constructed in the early 20th century, it is a traditional residence in wood and brick-clad in Hangzhou.	
LSJZ2-14	Xiaoputuo building by Wu Hill	Constructed in the late 19th century, it is a two-story building in wood and brick-clad, the traditional style in southern China.	
LSJZ2-15	The Building at 34, Guozinong Alley	Constructed in the 1930s, this building, also known as Shoushan Hall, was originally the clinic of He Jiuxiang, a famous gynecology doctor in Hangzhou.	
LSJZ2-16	The Building cluster at 10, 11 and 21, Second Alley, Jiangbian Road	Built during the World War II, this one-floor brick building, once a pump house, is the site of residue fortification of former Japanese Army at Datong Bridge.	
LSJZ2-17	The Building at 1, Alley 178, Nanshan Road	Constructed in the 1930s, it is an imitation of the Western-style two-floor building.	
LSJZ2-18	Building Cluster at 57 through 59, Dajing Alley	Constructed in the 1920s, this two-floor building is in timber structure, the former site of the famous Zhang Xiaoquan Scissors Store.	
LSJZ2-19	Shao Zhiyan Writing Brush Store	Constructed in the 1920s, it is a traditional Chinese-style two-story building in wood and brick-clad.	
LSJZ2-20	The Building at 19, Jueyuan Temple Alley	Constructed in the 1920s, this courtyard-style building, with a half-open parvis, is embedded with decorated iron parapets and brackets.	
LSJZ2-21	The Building at Zhugan Alley Community	Constructed in the 1930s, this building is a typical two-floor villa in brick-stone structure in the era of the Republic of China.	
LSJZ2-22	Hangzhou Gymnasium	Originally constructed in 1969, this building, with its saddle-shaped roof, has received the “Prominent Creative Work on Architecture” award by the Architecture Society of China.	
LSJZ2-23	The Building Cluster at No.24, Dengxin Alley	Reconstructed in 1992, it consists of two parallel attached buildings.	
LSJZ2-24	The Building at 1, Jiaochang Road	Constructed in the 1930s, it is a building featuring the blending of the Chinese and the Western styles.	
LSJZ2-25	The Building at 12, Rende Alley	Constructed between 1911 and 1949, it is a two-story Western style villa with an attic featuring slope- roof. The building has one layer in the width of 10m. Its wall is constructed from greenish bricks.	
LSJZ2-28	The Complex of Hangzhou Electronic Science and Technology University	The Complex of Hangzhou Electronic Science and Technology University Constructed in the 1950s, it consists of the Gongzi Building, East Teaching Building, West Teaching Building, and the Administrative Building.	
LSJZ2-29	The Complex of Yuquan Campus, Zhejiang University	Constructed in the 1950s, it is composed of 1 to No.6 Teaching Buildings in a blending of the Chinese and the Western styles, and 11 Teaching Building of Western style.	
LSJZ2-30	The Complex of Xixi Campus, Zhejiang University	Constructed in the 1950s, it is composed of the West Two, West Three, East Two Teaching Building, and the Seventh and Eighth Faculty Dormitory.	
LSJZ2-31	The Complex of School of Life Science, Xi’xi Campus, Zhejiang University	Constructed in the 1950s, it is composed of the administrative and teaching buildings, and the faculty dormitories.	
LSJZ2-32	The Complex of Zhejiang Communist Youth League School	Constructed in the 1950s, it is composed of the Administrative Building, East Faculty Dormitory, West Faculty Dormitory, and the Dining Hall.	
LSJZ2-33	The Complex of Zhejiang Education Institute	Constructed in the 1950s, it is composed of the Art and PE Building and student's apartment in Hexi area.	
LSJZ2-34	Main Building of Hangzhou Hotel	Constructed in 1956, this building features a blending of the Chinese and the Western styles, with a variety of roofs, flying eaves, warping angles, and splendid decorations.	
LSJZ2-35	3 Building of the Worker's Sanatorium, Zhejiang Federation of Trade Unions	Constructed in 1956, this brick-concrete building features a blending of the Chinese and the Western styles.	
LSJZ2-36	1 Building of Liu's Villa	Constructed in late Qing dynasty and reconstructed in 1959, it was the temporary lodging of Chairman Mao Zedong during his visit to Hanghzou.	
LSJZ2-37	The Building Cluster of Wang's Villa	It is composed of the former residence of Wang Zixin, a merchant from Anhui, and No. 1 Building, the former Constructed in the 1820s and the latter in the 1950s.	
LSJZ2-38	The Villa at 97, Beishan Road	Constructed in the 1940s, this Western-style private villa was designed by Gong Wenqian, a famous architect.	
LSJZ2-39	The Villa at 4, Lingyin Road	Constructed between 1911 and 1949, this building, also called the Yellow Villa, was purchased by Shanghai American-run Shenchang Company as its property in the West Lake area.	
LSJZ2-40	The Villa at 10, Lingyin Road	Constructed in the 1930s, it is a two-story Western-style villa in wood and brick-clad. It is the former residence of Artist Lei Guiyuan.	
LSJZ2-41	The Villa at 11, Lingyin Road	Constructed between 1911 and 1949, it is a two-story villa in wood and brick-clad.	
LSJZ2-42	The Villa Cluster at Shengtang Road	Constructed in the 1920s, this cluster, originally named Jiuzhi Small Cottage, is a luxury villa built by Huang Chujiu, the famous businessman in Shanghai.	
LSJZ2-43	Shihan Villa	Constructed in the 1920s, this two-story European-style villa in brick-stone structure was originally one of the Villas in Laiyin Small Cottage Villa Cluster.	
LSJZ2-44	The Complex of Mituo Temple	Constructed in the 1850s, this building was one of the four largest temples in Hangzhou. Now only its traditionally Chinese style main hall and bonze’s dormitories are left.	
LSJZ2-45	Huai Villa	Constructed between 1911 and 1949, this building, originally named Hanmingde Hall, was the school of East China Revolutionary University and Zhejiang Administrative School.	
LSJZ2-46	The Complex of the Former Site of Jianqiao Aviation School	Constructed between the 1930s and 1940s, it is composed of 1 to 6, 30, 36 and 39 buildings, the dining hall, office building, waiting building, and the hospital of the Air Force in the airport.	
LSJZ2-47	The Complex of Huajiachi Campus, Zhejiang University	Constructed in the 1950s, it is composed of East Teaching Building, West Teaching Building, Comity Hall, Peace Hall, Democracy Hall, Cansang (silkworm and mulberry) Hall, and Xiaoerlou Villa Complex.	
