= National Monuments of Mexico =

The National Monuments of Mexico refers to the buildings and monuments that are protected heritage of the nation, and are declared as such in the Registro Público de Monumentos y Zonas Arqueológicos e Históricos maintained by the Instituto Nacional de Antropología e Historia and the Registro Público de Monumentos y Zonas Artísticos maintained by the Instituto Nacional de Bellas Artes y Literatura.

== Archeological monuments and zones ==
"Archaeological" refers to paleontological and pre-Hispanic structures, zones, remnants, etc.

== Historical monuments ==
"Historical" refers to post-Conquest 16th- to 19th-century structures, zones, documents, etc.

Due to their importance in Mexico's art history, all works by José María Velasco Gómez, Dr. Atl, José Clemente Orozco and Diego Rivera were declared historical monuments.

== Artistic monuments ==
"Artistic" refers to properties that are of significant aesthetic value. The valuation of aesthetic value is left to the Comisión Nacional de Zonas y Monumentos Artísticos (National Commission of Artistic Zones and Monuments). This commission is composed of the Director of INBAL, a representative of the Secretaría de Desarrollo Urbano y Ecología, a representative of UNAM, and three individuals affiliated with the arts picked by the Director.

Some works from artists such as Frida Kahlo, David Alfaro Siqueiros and Remedios Varo have been deemed artistic monuments.
