= Bé d'interès cultural =

Andorran name for a National Heritage Site

A Bé d'interès cultural (BIC) is the Andorran name for a National Heritage Site listed by the Andorran heritage register, Patrimoni Cultural.

The term literally means "Property of Cultural Interest", although a better translation could be "Heritage of Cultural Interest", as Andorra now protects not only material heritage, like monuments or movable works of art, but also intangible cultural heritage.

== Sub-categories ==
- Non-movable Andorran heritage is divided into the following classifications:
  - Monument, which as the term monument implies, refers to buildings or other individual constructions such as public art or memorials that have significant cultural value.
  - Conjunt arquitectònic (architectural group or set), grouping of buildings that constitutes a coherent unit, regardless of individual value.
  - Paisatge cultural (cultural landscape), joint work of man and nature with aesthetic, historical or cultural value. E.g. Madriu-Perafita-Claror Valley
  - Zona arqueològica (archaeological area), area with traces of human intervention in the past.
  - Zona paleontològica (paleontological area), area with fossilized remains forming a coherent unit.
- Movable heritage, such archaeological objects, bibliographic heritage, and large works of art.

== See also ==
- Cultural Heritage of Andorra
- Culture of Andorra
- Cultural Heritage
