= List of fifth batch of declared historic buildings in Hangzhou =

Fifth batch of declared historical buildings in Hangzhou represent buildings considered important in the city relating to the arts, science, history, and/or culture. Despite Hangzhou's urbanization over the last century, some of the buildings were constructed during the Qing dynasty, with others having been built more recently in the 1960s and 1980s. Although some of the declared historical buildings have attempted to be destroyed in the past, new regulations from the Hangzhou municipal government have been introduced to greater protect the listed buildings since 2010.

On March 22, 2010, forty-three buildings were declared as historically important, and were officially considered such by the creation of the fifth batch of declared historical buildings.

Contents: Batches of Hangzhou declared historic buildings / See also: Hangzhou
- First batch
- Second batch
- Third batch
- Fourth batch
- Fifth batch

No.	Name	Notes/References	Photographs
LSJZ5-1	19 Jinchaidai Alley and 10, 12, and 13 Zhupo Alley	Constructed during the late-Qing dynasty by a government official of the Zhu family. The buildings all are surrounded by mud walls with a wooden two-story structure inside. All of the buildings can be accessed through a central courtyard shared between them.	
LSJZ5-2	Buildings at 29, 32, 34, 35, 38, 39, and 40, Jinchaidai Alley	Constructed between late Qing Dynasty and the early Republic of China, they are two-story courtyard residential timber architecture consisting of buildings No. 29, No. 32, No. 34, No, 35, No. 39, and No. 40.	
LSJZ5-3	Buildings at 5, 6, 7, and 9, Yuanbao Street	Constructed between late Qing Dynasty and the early Republic of China, they are two-story courtyard residential building in timber structure.	
LSJZ5-4	Buildings at 16, and 17, Niuyangsi Alley	Constructed in the late Qing Dynasty, they are two-story courtyard residential building in timber structure.	
LSJZ5-5	Building of Zhejiang Design Institute of Water Conservancy & Hydraulic Power	Constructed in the early 1950s, it is a two-story building in wood and brick-clad, blending the Western and Chinese styles.	
LSJZ5-6	Architectural complex of the Residential Quarter of Hangzhou Meat Processing Factory	Constructed in the early 1950s, they are buildings in wood and brick-clad, including Buildings 2, 3, 5, 6, 8 and 10, blending the Western and Chinese styles.	
LSJZ5-7	Building at 15, Nanwazi Alley	Constructed in the 1920s, it is a two-story courtyard residential building in timber structure.	
LSJZ5-8	Former Science Museum of the Branch of Hangzhou No. 2 Middle School	Constructed in the 1950s, it is a three-story Western-style building for education purpose in brick and concrete structure.	
LSJZ5-9	Buildings from #1 to 18, Renzhi Li Alley	Constructed in the early Republic of China, they are 2-story buildings in wood and brick-clad, representative of residential architecture in Alley.	
LSJZ5-10	Zhejiang Exhibition Hall	Constructed in the 1970s, it used to be the biggest multi-purpose exhibition hall in Zhejiang, also Known as Hong Tai Yang Exhibition Hall.	
LSJZ5-11	Architecture of Zhejiang Ramie Mill	Constructed in the 1950s, it is a two-story building in wood and brick-clad and used to be the office building of Zhejiang Ramie Mill.	
LSJZ5-12	Architecture at the Site of Chongren Temple	Constructed in the late Qing Dynasty, it is a two-story building in timber structure, used for religious purpose.	
LSJZ5-13	Architecture of Hangzhou Silk Printing and Dying United Factory	Constructed in the 1950s, it was the typical form of cotton mill buildings at that time in Hangzhou.	
LSJZ5-14	Architectural Complex of Hangzhou Dahe Shipyard	Built between the 1960s and 1970s, it is a kind of large-space workshop building.	
LSJZ5-15	Architecture of Qiaoxi Warehouse of Hangzhou Specialties Co, Ltd	Constructed between 1911 and 1949, it is a typical form of warehouse buildings along the Canal in Hangzhou.	
LSJZ5-16	Architectural complex of Xiaohe Oil Warehouse of Hangzhou Petroleum Company, Zhejiang	Constructed between the 1960s and 1980s, the complex consists of three warehouses, one hypaethral-reinforced concrete building, and three oil tanks.	
LSJZ5-17	Luos' Old House, Pengbu Town	Constructed in the late Qing Dynasty, it is a two-story traditional residential building in the timber structure in the suburb of Hangzhou.	
LSJZ5-18	Building #1 of Research Buildings at Zhejiang Gongshang University (149, Jiaogong Road)	Constructed in the 1950s, it is a three-story building in wood and brick-clad, blending the Western and Chinese styles for educational purposes.	
LSJZ5-19	Buildings at 99#, 100# Mituosi Road	Constructed in the late Qing Dynasty, it is a religious building in timber structure, formerly the auxiliary buildings of Mituo Temple.	
LSJZ5-20	Buildings at 15, 18, 20, and 28, Liushuiqiao Alley	Constructed in the early Republic of China, it is a religious building in timber structure, formerly the Fayu Nunnery.	
LSJZ5-21	Architectural complex in Miaoxi Street	Constructed in the late Qing Dynasty, it is a residential architecture cluster in timber structure, including building at 20, 22, 24, 32, and 38, Miaoxi Street.	
LSJZ5-22	Architectural complex at 1, 2, and 3, Xueshiqiao	Constructed in the 1930s, it consists of three Western-style villas.	
LSJZ5-23	Villa at the foot of the Daci Hill, Yang Fang Shan Wu Zhi Ling	Constructed in the 1930s, it is a villa in wood and brick-clad, blending the Western and Chinese styles.	
LSJZ5-24	Building at 1, Yuquan Road	Constructed in the 1930s, it consists of three Western-style buildings and used to be the residence of Lin Wenzheng and his wife Cai Weilian, daughter of Cai Yuanpei.	
LSJZ5-25	Building at 2, Yuquan Road	Constructed in the 1930s, it is a one-story building in wood and brick-clad. It is the former residence of Wu Dayu, a famous oil painter of China.	
LSJZ5-26	Residential Building of Hangzhou Staff Training Center	Constructed in the 1950s, the building is a two-story Western-style apartment in brick-stone structure.	
LSJZ5-27	Architectural complex at the Site of Fantian Temple	Constructed between 1911 and 1949, it is a religious building consisting of three buildings in timber structure.	
LSJZ5-28	AuxiliaryBuilding of Hangzhou Normal University	Constructed in the early 1950s, it is a one-story building in wood and brick-clad, blending the Western and Chinese styles.	
LSJZ5-29	Villa at 100, Beishan Road	Constructed in the 1930s, it is a two-story villa in wood and brick-clad. It is also named Dongshan Villa.	
LSJZ5-30	Architectural complex at 40, Xiang Qi Fang	Constructed in the late Qing Dynasty, it is a traditional courtyard residential architecture group in timber structure.	
LSJZ5-31	Building at 67, Shan Xia Li Alley	Constructed in the late Qing Dynasty, it is a traditional residential architecture cluster.	
LSJZ5-32	Architectural complex at 72, 73, and 74, Xiangqifang	Constructed in the late Qing Dynasty, it is a traditional courtyard residential architecture group in timber structure, including #72, 73, 74, and 58–1, Xiang Qi Fang.	
LSJZ5-33	Architectural complex of the Grain Supply Center at Xiangqifang	Constructed in the late Qing Dynasty, it is a traditional courtyard residential architecture group in timber structure.	
LSJZ5-34	Architectural complex at 109, 111, and 113, Xiangqifang	Constructed in the late Qing Dynasty, it is a traditional residential architecture cluster.	
LSJZ5-35	Architectural complex of at 158, and 159, Xiangqifang	Constructed in the mid and late Qing Dynasty, it is a traditional residential architecture cluster.	
LSJZ5-36	Building Cluster at Xiazhuangli	Constructed between late Qing Dynasty and the early Republic of China, it is a traditional residential architecture cluster.	
LSJZ5-37	Building Cluster at 18, He Dou	Constructed in the late Qing Dynasty, it is a traditional residential architecture cluster.	
LSJZ5-38	Building Cluster at 9, and 10, He Dou	Constructed in the mid and late Qing Dynasty, it is a traditional residential architecture cluster.	
LSJZ5-39	Building Cluster at 23, Shuang Miao	Constructed in the late Qing Dynasty, it is a traditional residential architecture cluster.	
LSJZ5-40	Building Cluster at 40, Zhang Jia Li	Constructed in the mid Qing Dynasty, it is a representative of traditional residential architecture in Xiaoshan.	
LSJZ5-41	Buildings at 171, and 172 of Xiamen Village, Heshang Town	Constructed in the late Qing Dynasty, they are representatives of traditional residential architecture in Xiaoshan.	
LSJZ5-42	Dormitory buildings 4 and 5 of the Zhejiang Institute of Education		
LSJZ5-43	Student dormitory building and industrial building 3 and 4, Yuquan Campus, Zhejiang University		
