= Central Register of Monuments =

Coordinates: 43°52′N 18°25′E

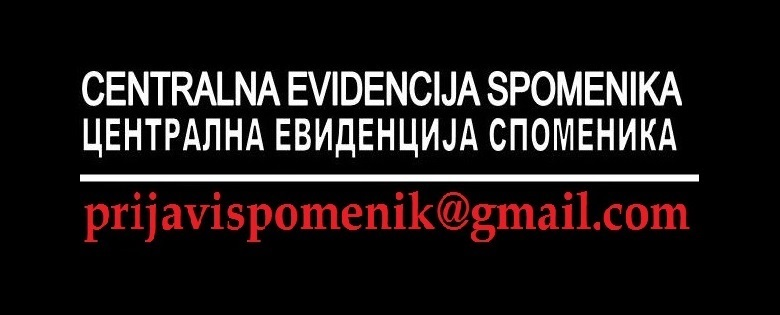
}

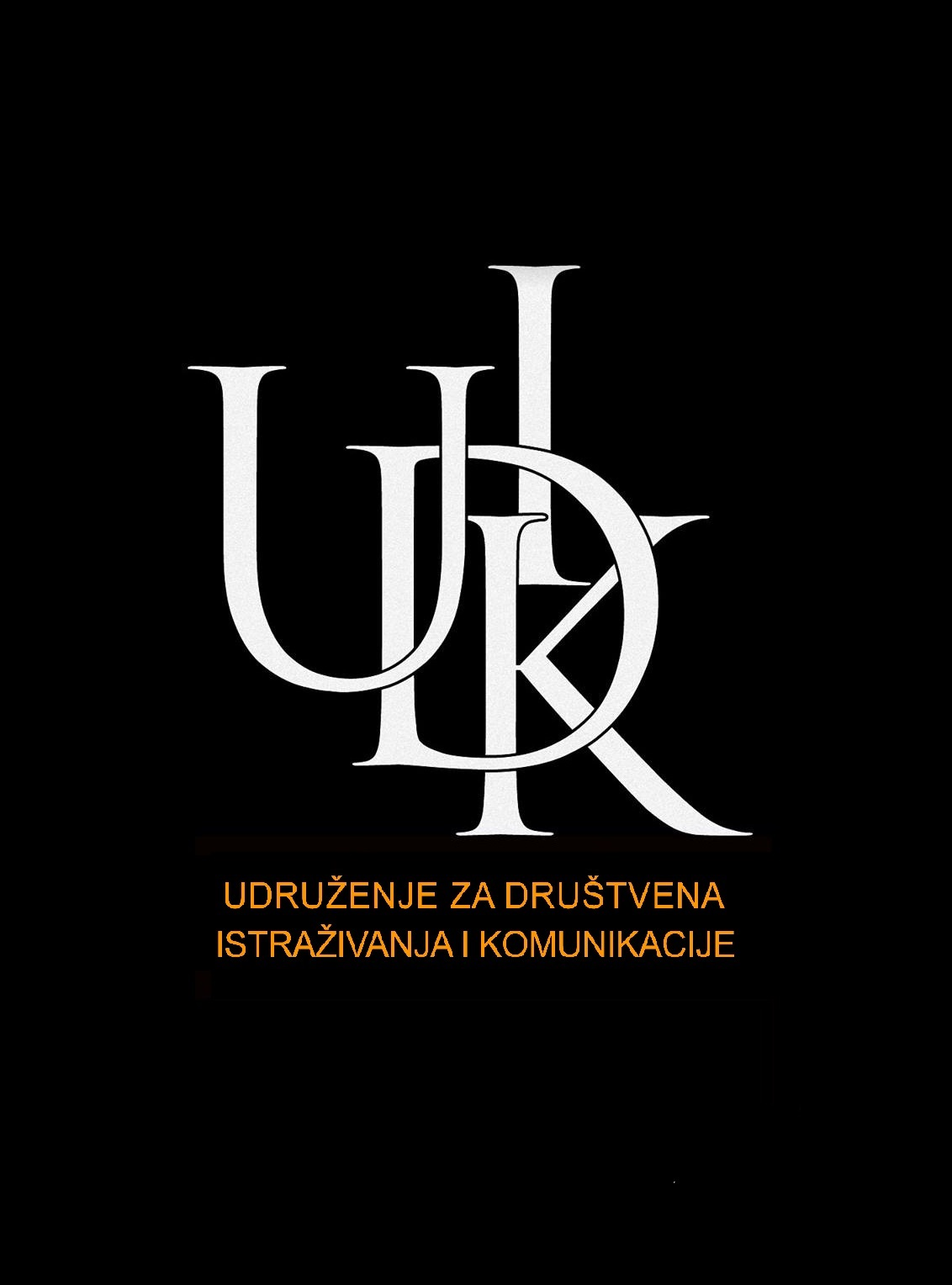

Central Register of Monuments (Bosnian: Centralna evidencija spomenika, Croatian: Središnji registar spomenika, Serbian: Централна евиденција споменика), abbreviated CES is the only record of memorials in Bosnia and Herzegovina and Croatia, which were built in the post-conflict period in Bosnia and Herzegovina (1996 – 2016) and Croatia (1996-2017).

Central Register of Monuments is managed and regulated by the UDIK. It is a part of the UDIK's program for the countries of the former Yugoslavia
