= National Institute of Immovable Cultural Heritage =

The National Institute of Immovable Cultural Heritage (Bulgarian: Национален институт за недвижимо културно наследство) is a government organization under the Ministry of Culture of Bulgaria which performs scientific and administrative duties related to the preservation of buildings and sites ("immovable property") as parts of Bulgarian cultural heritage. It maintains the national public register of immovable objects of cultural value of national and global importance.
