= National Heritage Database =

Heritage Database

The National Heritage Database is an online database containing information about various types of heritage-listed places in Australia and around the world.

It is a searchable database which includes:

- places in the World Heritage List;
- places in the Australian National Heritage List;
- places in the Commonwealth National Heritage List;
- places in the Register of the National Estate (a non-statutory archived list);
- places in the List of Overseas Places of Historic Significance to Australia; and
- places that have ever been considered for, or are currently under consideration for, any one of these lists.
