= Monuments of Ecuador =

The national monuments of Ecuador offer unique insights into the country's rich history and culture. Most monuments reflect the country's position on the equator and its tradition of pre-Columbian civilizations, as well as Spanish influence.

== List ==
- Mitad del Mundo
- Ingapirca
- Arco de la Capilla del Rosario
- Carondelet Palace
- Metropolitan Cathedral of Quito
- La Rotonda
- The Moorish Clock Tower

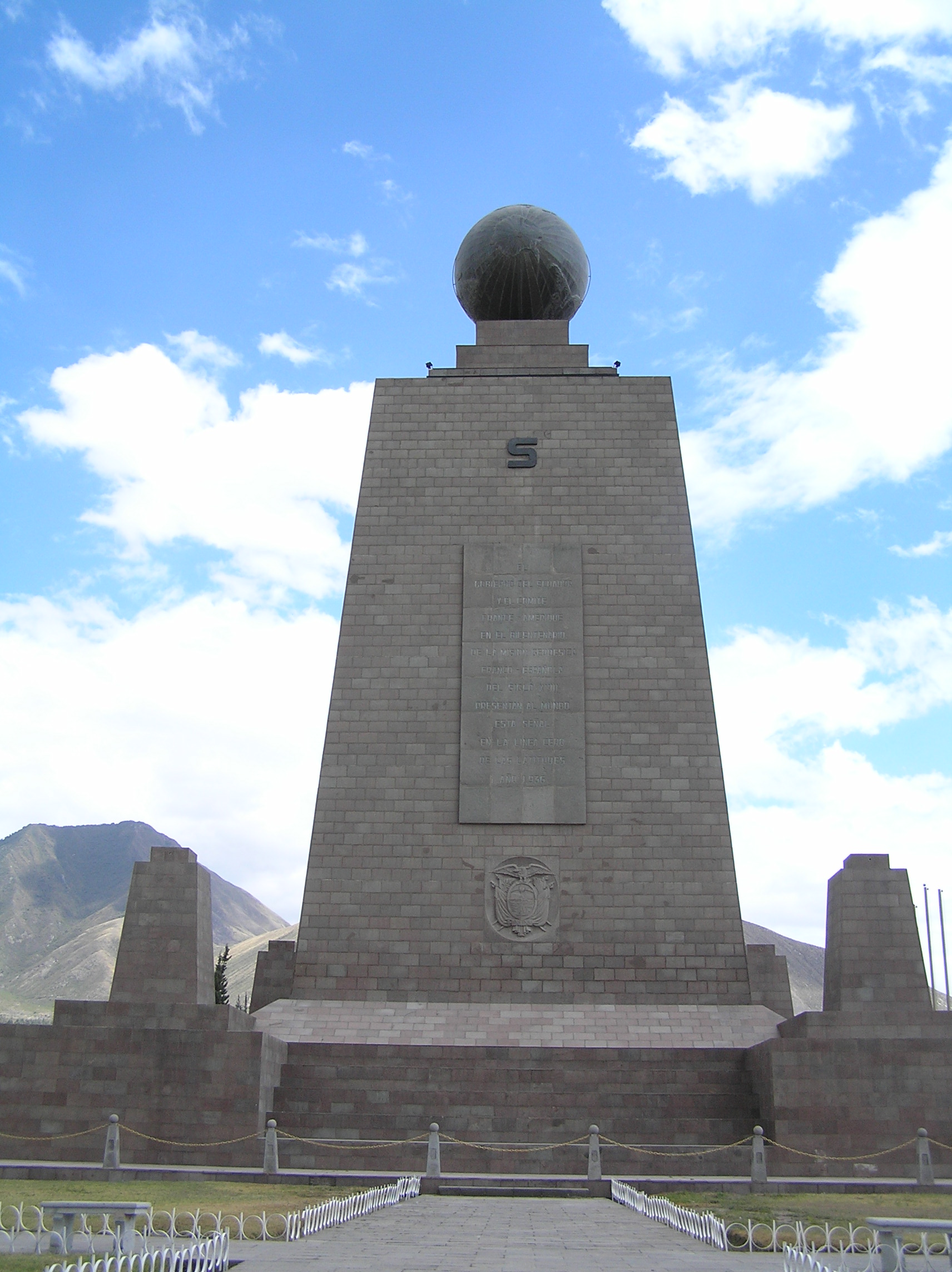
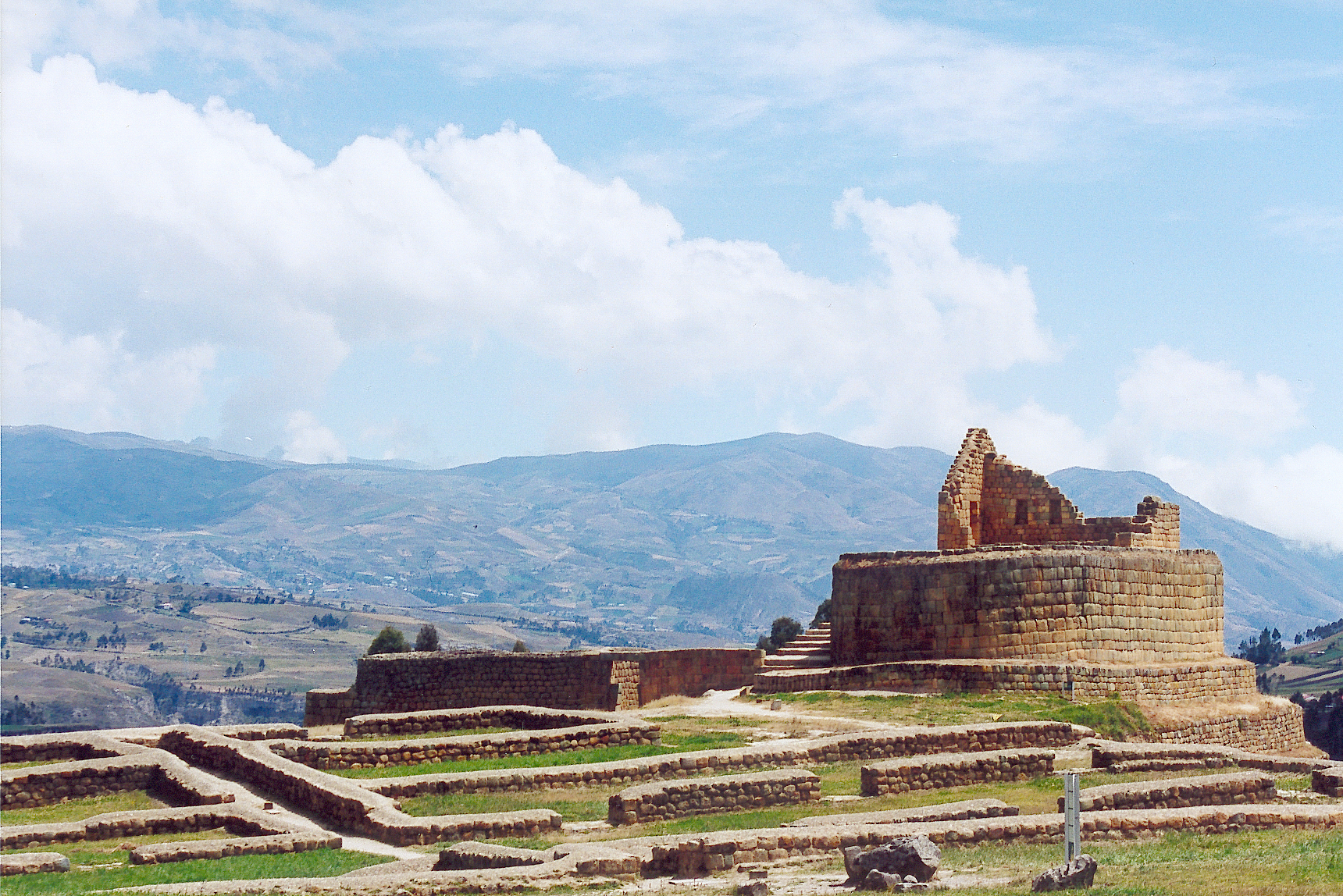
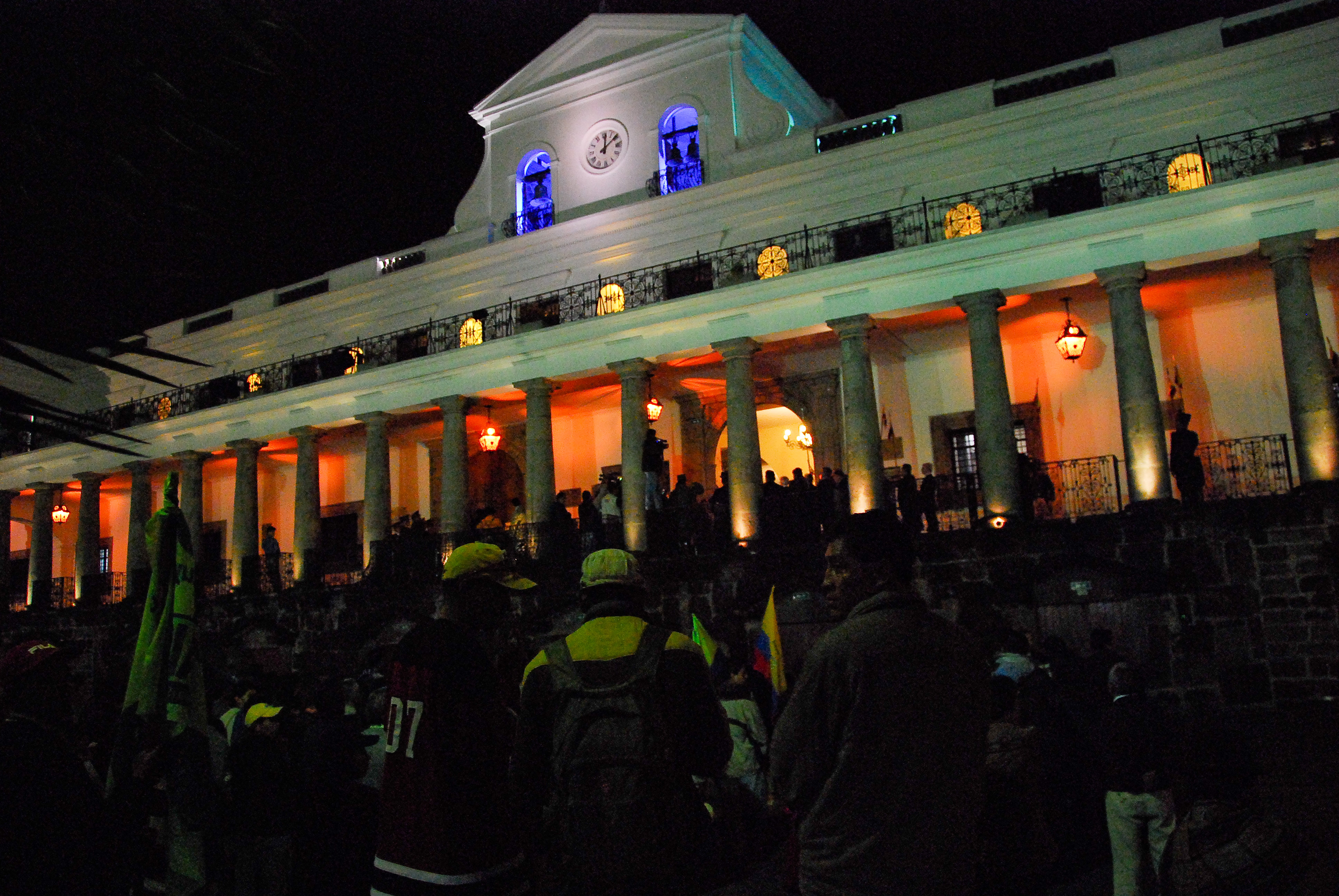
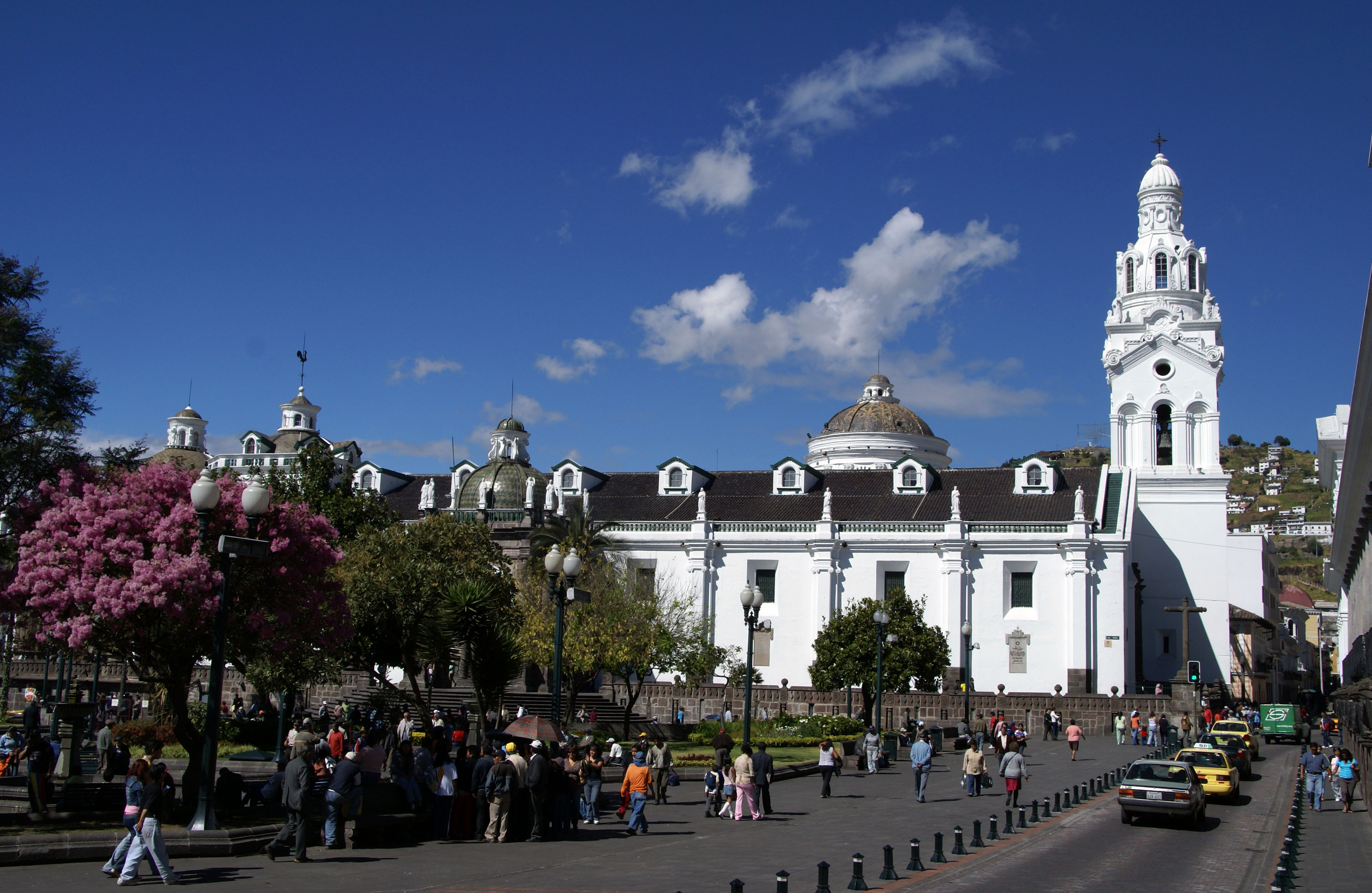
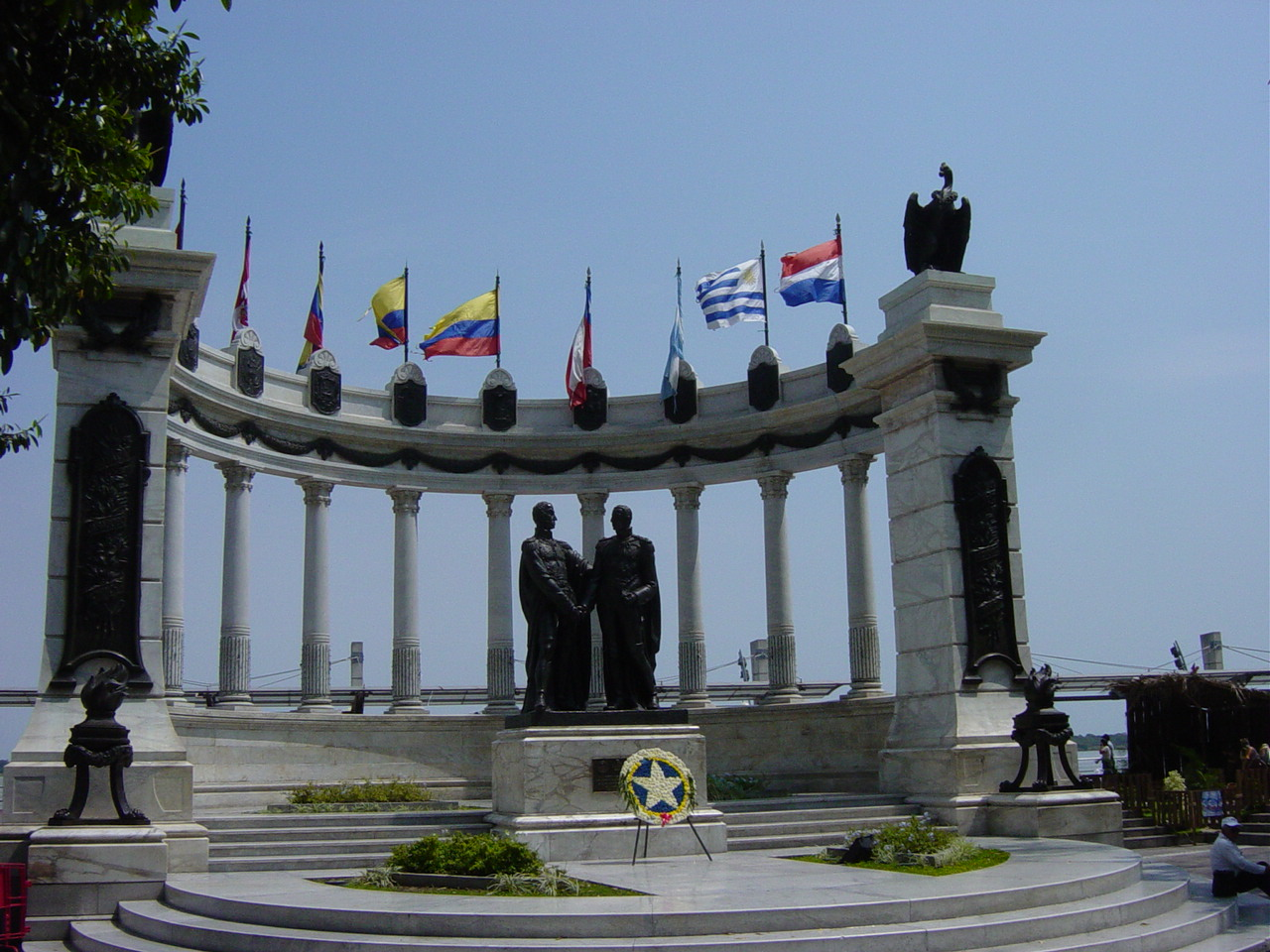
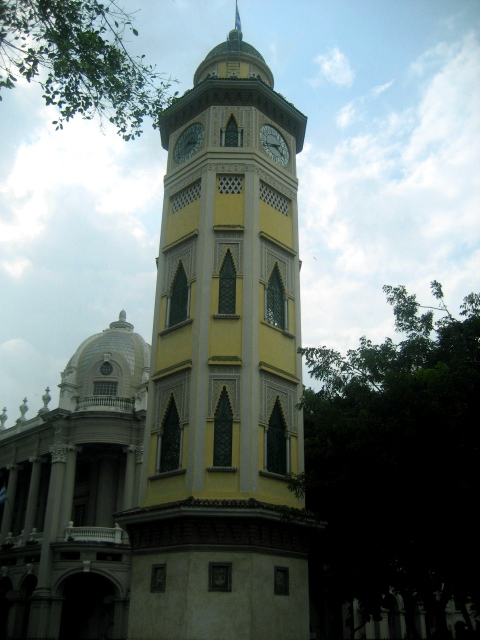
Monuments in Ecuador
		Need Picture
Mitad del Mundo; Mitad del Mundo City, Pichincha	Ingapirca; Azogues, Cañar	Arco de la capilla del Rosario; Quito, Pichincha
Palacio de Carondelet; Quito, Pichincha	Metropolitan Cathedral; Quito, Pichincha	La Rotonda; Guayaquil, Guayas	Moorish Clock Tower; Guayaquil, Guayas
