= Friends of Vietnam Heritage =

Friends of Vietnam Heritage (FVH) is a non-profit educational group dedicated to preserving and understanding Vietnam's culture. Established in Hanoi by citizens of many countries.

== Activities ==
- Study groups on topics of history or related fields.
- Study tours to historical and cultural sites, craft villages and other sites related to everyday life.
- Lectures and events on heritage culture and life in Vietnam
- Collection and maintenance of books and reference materials on Vietnamese heritage and culture to support the FVH study groups.

The organization has authored several books.

== Publications ==
- Trá̂n Quó̂c Pagoda Hanoi, Friends of Vietnam heritage, Sulekha Kumar, Tini Ngo Thien Huong, The Gioi Publishers, 2006.
- Traditional medicine street: Phó̂ Lãn Óng, Hà Nội, Thế Giới Publishers (Hanoi, Vietnam), Friends of Vietnam Heritage, 2005.
- Vignettes of French culture in Hanoi, Friends of Vietnam Heritage, Thé̂ Giới Publishers, 2008
- Bát Tràng, traditional pottery village: a self-guided walk, Friends of Vietnam Heritage, Thế Giới Publishers, 2006
