= Franklin Virtual High School =

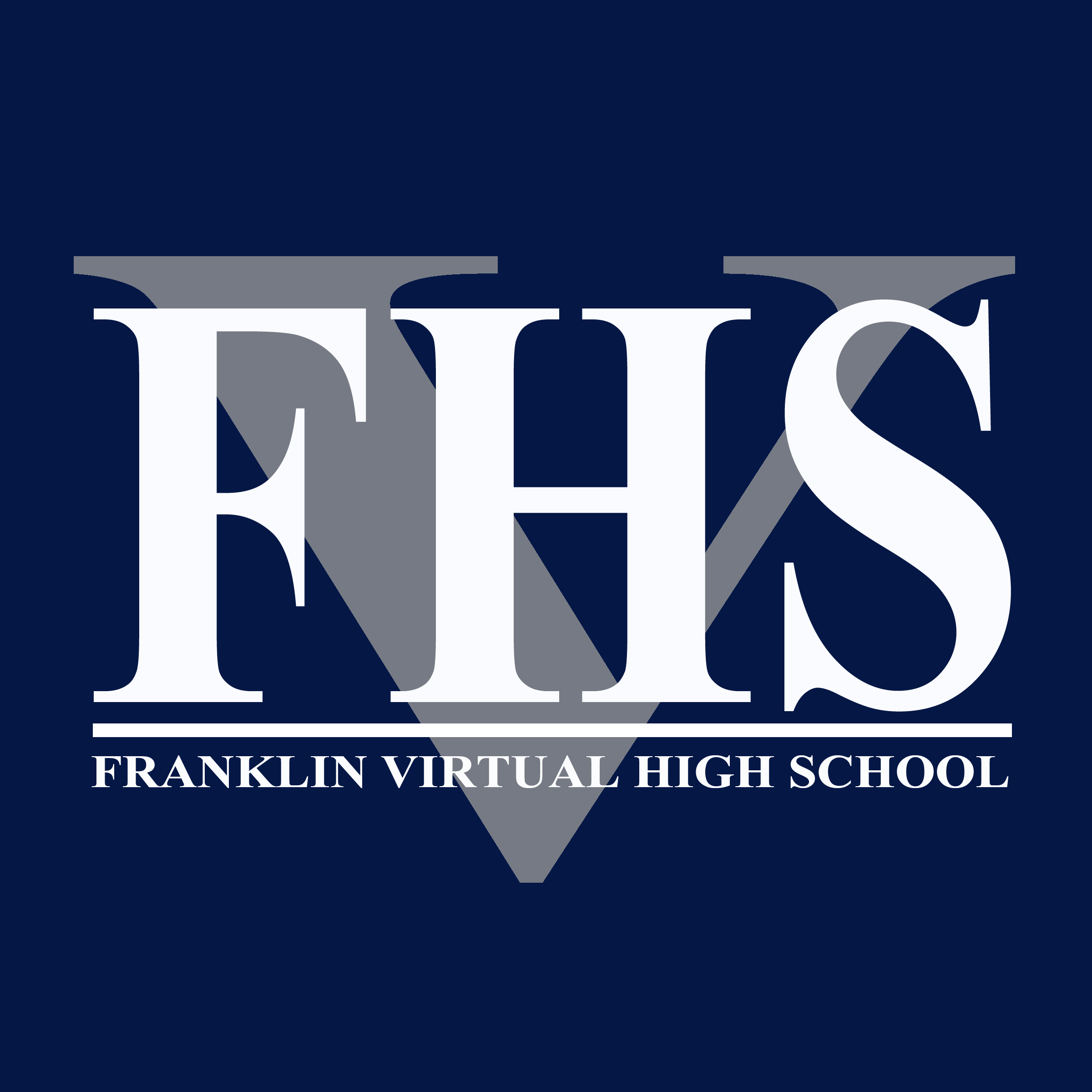

Location
- 545 E Tennessee; Tallahassee, Florida

Information
- Type: Private high school
- Established: 2010
- Dean: Janeen Scaringelli
- Principal: David Hooser
- Grades: 9-12
- Website: www.FranklinVirtualSchools.com

Franklin Virtual High School (or FVHS) is a private online high school located in Tallahassee, Florida. It was established in 2010 and provides its entire academic program online only (virtual campus).

== Description ==
Franklin Virtual High School provides programs and services that are designed for both teenage and adult students. Programs of study, which are offered via distance learning, include a complete high school curriculum.

== Accreditation ==
FVHS is accredited by AdvancED and is registered with the Florida Board of Education School Choice for Private Education database.

== Mission ==
Provide quality, flexible, cost-effective education options to help students achieve their personal, educational and career goals.
