= Park furniture =

Furniture designed for use in parks

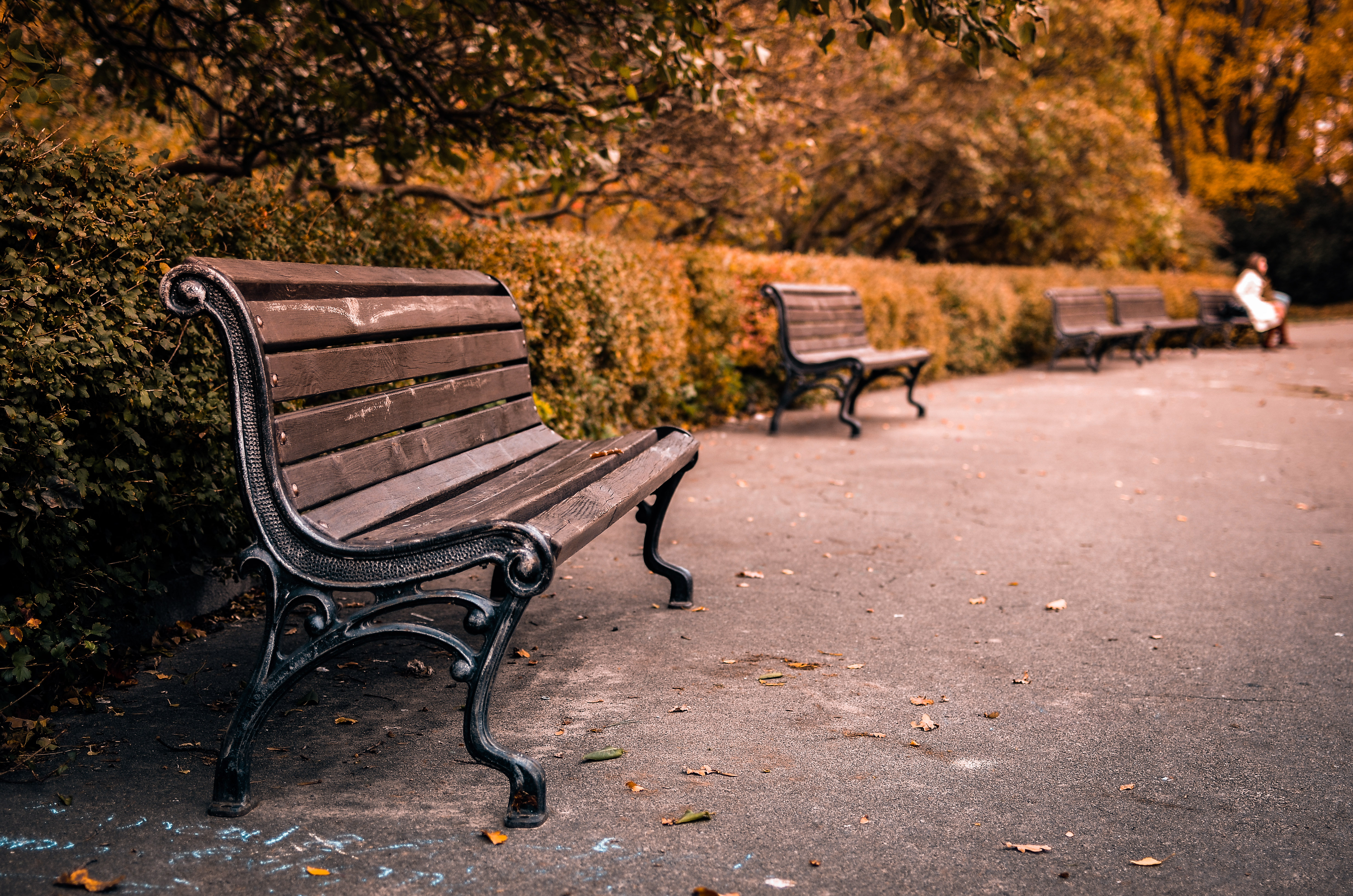
Park benches at Hryshko National Botanical Garden, Kyiv, Ukraine

Park furniture is furniture in a park. It is often made out of iron or wood.

Common examples of park furniture include bandstands, benches, chess tables, fountains, light fixtures, picnic tables, and statues.

== Description ==
Researchers in Hong Kong wrote that park furniture is "a type of artifact to support outdoor public recreational activities and green environment where users may act fairly as stated by British Standards Institute (2005)"; this means that the furniture should be inclusive – "accessible to, and usable by, as many people as reasonably possible ... without the need for special adaptation or specialised design".

== Construction ==
Around 1840, Janes, Beebe & Co. produced one of the earliest products of mass-produced cast-iron seating in America, an example of which is held by the Smithsonian Institution as inv. no. 1980.006. The seat is an example of furniture that appeared in public parks in the mid 19th century.

In some jurisdictions, furniture used in public parks is made by prison inmates as part of prison work programs.

== See also ==
- Beach furniture
- Garden furniture
- Street furniture
