= Entranceway at Main Street at Darwin Drive =

- U.S. National Register of Historic Places
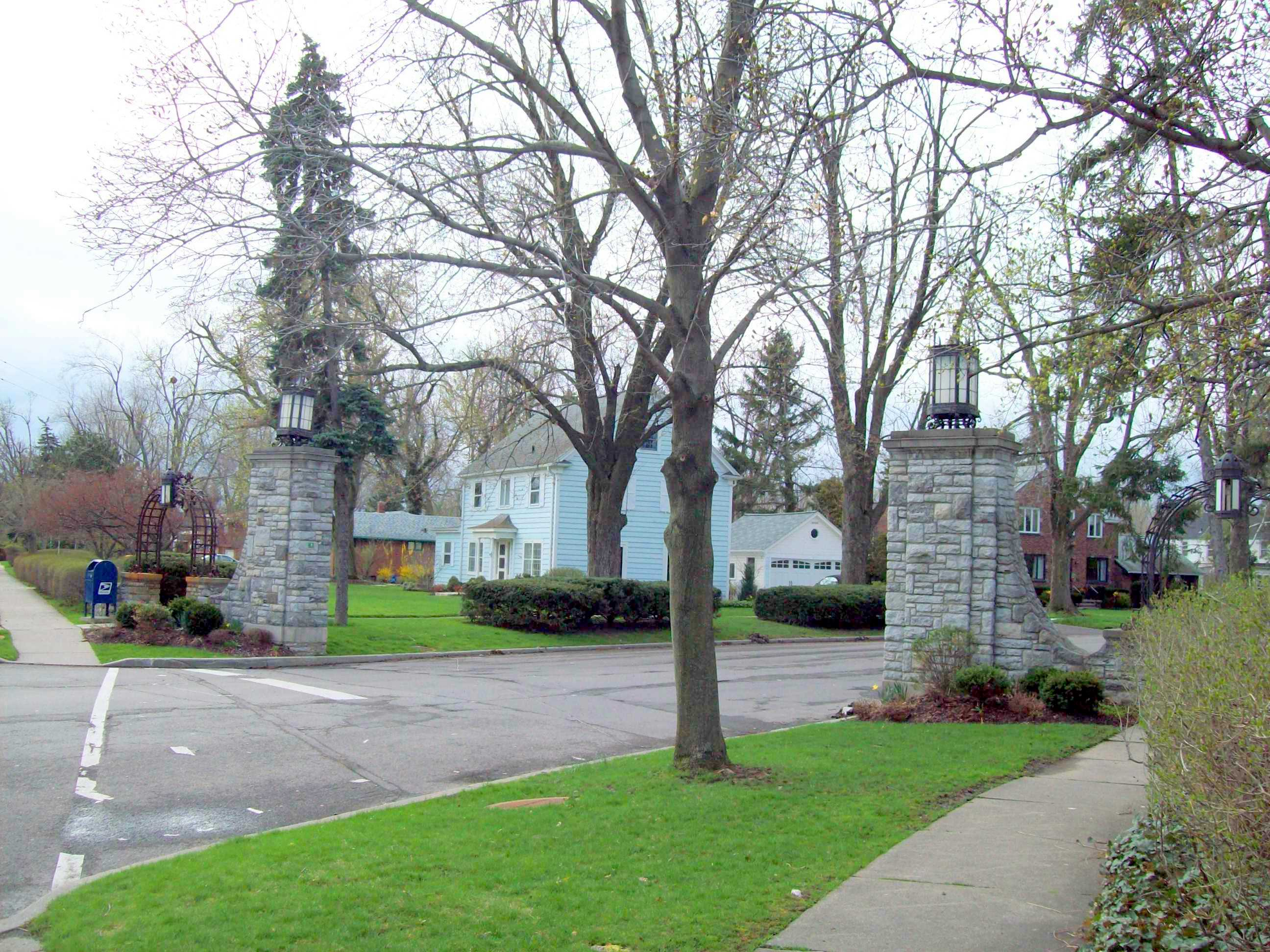
- Entranceway at Main Street at Darwin Drive, April 2010

- Location within New York Location within the United States
- Location: Main St., jct. with Darwin Drive, Amherst, New York
- Coordinates: 42°57′41.98″N 78°46′42.04″W
- Built: 1927
- Architect: Burkhardt, Charles S.
- MPS: Suburban Development of Buffalo, New York MPS
- NRHP reference No.: 09000554
- Added to NRHP: July 23, 2009

Entranceway at Main Street at Darwin Drive is a suburban residential subdivision entranceway and street furniture built about 1927 by developer Charles S. Burkhardt. It is located on Main Street (New York State Route 5) in the town of Amherst within Erie County. It consists of two matching sets of stone sculptures set on either side of the drive. It also includes the painted metal street sign post.

It was added to the National Register of Historic Places in 2009.

== See also ==
Entranceway at Main Street at High Park Boulevard
