= Street furniture =

Equipment installed along streets and roads

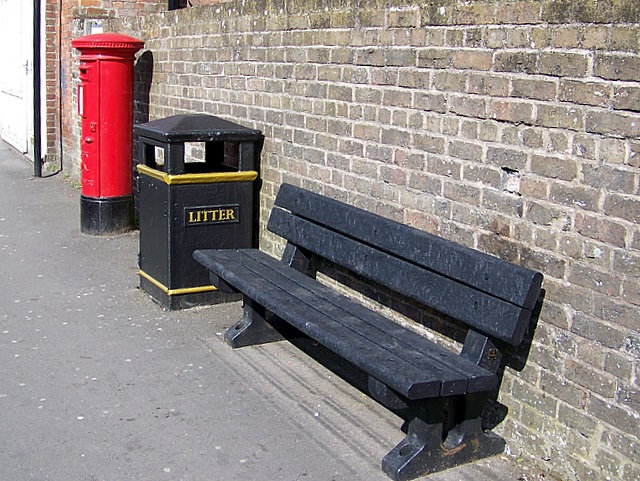
A postbox, litter bin and bench on a street in Warminster, England

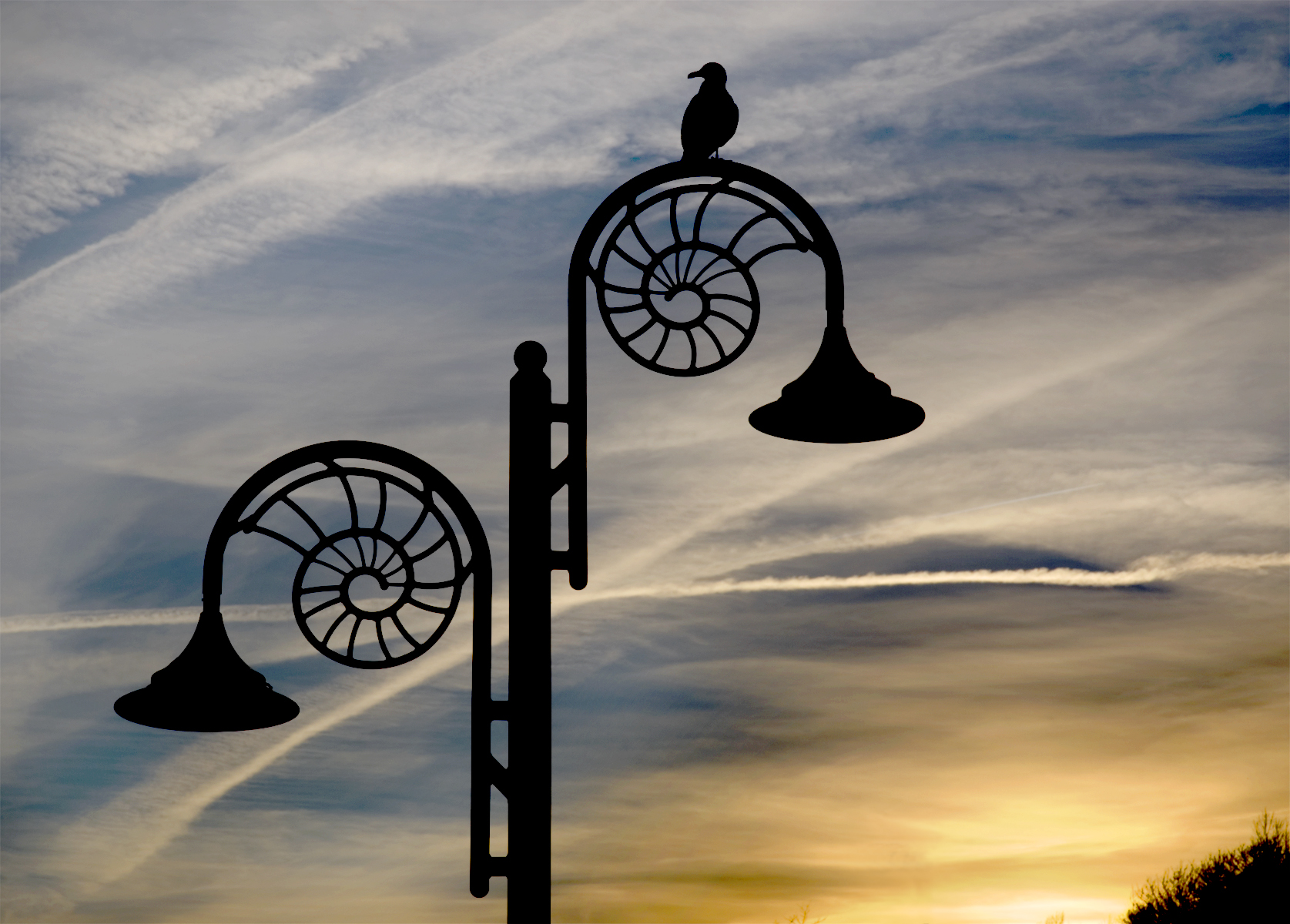
Street furniture can reflect local culture or famous aspects of where they are located, as here at Lyme Regis, where the ammonite-design streetlamps reflect the town's location on the Jurassic Coast, a World Heritage site.

Street furniture is a collective term for objects and pieces of equipment installed along streets and roads for various purposes, such as benches, post boxes, streetlamps and traffic signs.

== Description and use ==
Street furniture is a collective term used in the United States, United Kingdom, Australia, Canada, and Ireland. It refers to objects and pieces of equipment installed along streets and roads for various purposes. The design and placement of furniture should take into account aesthetics, visual identity, function, pedestrian mobility and road safety. For example, street furniture can be positioned to control overspill parking in addition to its primary purpose; for example a bench and a number of bollards may be used to block access to a sidewalk or verges for vehicles.

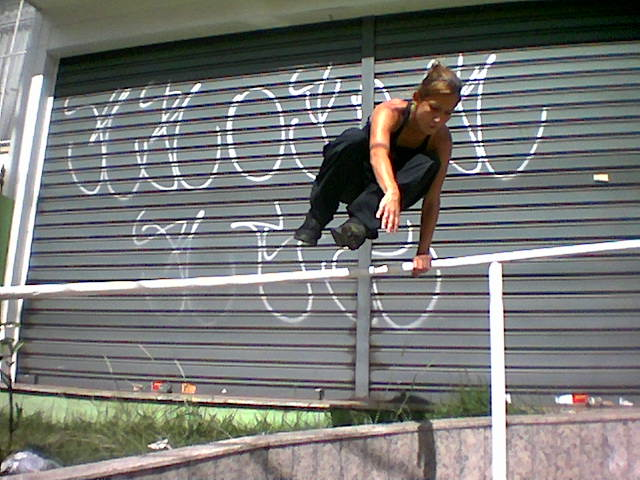
A parkour practitioner vaults over a rail.

Street furniture is used unofficially as sports equipment for skateboarding, parkour and street workout.

== Items ==
The signage systems of Metz, France, were created by Swiss designer Ruedi Baur.

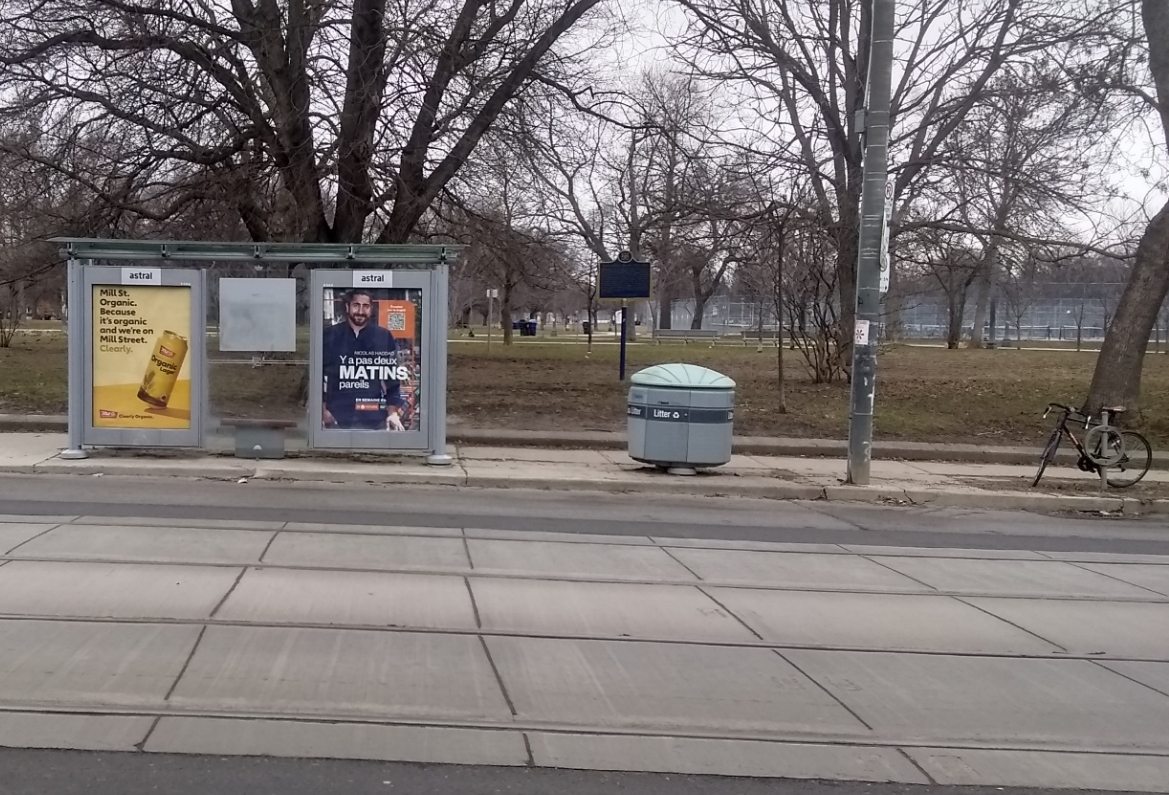
Various street furniture in Toronto including a bus shelter, advertising displays, wastebins, historical plaque and bicycle stand

- Street name signs identify streets for the unfamiliar, especially benefiting visitors, postal workers and the emergency services. They may also indicate the district in which a street lies.
- Benches are usually found in central parts of settlements, such as plazas and parks. They are often provided by the local councils or contributors to serve as a place to rest and admire views. Armrests in between are sometimes provided to discourage lying down and unwanted closeness, which can be seen or intended as hostile architecture.
- Anti sit-lie dispositives, another type of hostile architecture intended to prevent people (i.e. rough sleepers) from sitting or lying down.
- Bollards are posts, short poles, or pillars placed to prevent vehicle movement into areas where they are not desired, and to protect buildings and other site features.
- Litter bins or garbage cans, are strategically placed to try to entice people into not littering on the streets.
- Post boxes, also known as mail boxes, are found throughout the world, and have a variety of forms.
- Phone boxes or telephone booths or phone booths are prominent in most cities. While they range drastically in the amount of cover they offer users (e.g. many only cover the phone itself while others provide full booths) they are typically easy to spot. The widespread use of mobile phones has resulted in a decrease in their numbers.
- Streetlamps or street lights are designed to illuminate the surrounding area at night, serving not only as a deterrent to criminals but more importantly to allow people to see where they're going. The colour of streetlamp bulbs differ, but are generally white or yellow.
- Traffic lights (or traffic signals) usually include three colours: green indicates vehicles should proceed through an intersection; amber indicates vehicles should prepare to stop; and red indicates vehicles should not enter the intersection. They are generally mounted on poles or gantries or hung from wires.
- Traffic signs communicate road conditions to inform safe driver behaviours. Postings may specify aspects such as speed limits, intersection protocols, slippery road conditions or reduced visibility. Direction signs tell the reader the way to a location through diagrams or written instructions. Signs may be illuminated to aid nighttime users.
- Public lavatories offer restroom facilities, either for free or for a fee.
- Fire hydrants.
- Parking meters.
- Poster poles or advertising columns provide space for advertising.
- Waste containers or litter bins are receptacles for public garbage disposal. Collection and separation of recyclable materials is becoming more common in urban centers.
- Emergency telephone boxes allow members of the public to directly contact emergency service operators.
- Street curbstones.
- Paving stones, brick rosettes or granite cobbles, sometimes even wood.
- Defunct village pump spouts and village lock-ups, both common in the United Kingdom
- Outdoor vending machines, such as newspaper vending machines
- Planter boxes and other apparatuses for plant life and landscaping

=== Outdoor advertising ===
- Posters are a part of out-of-home media (also referred to as OOH). The presentation of backlit posters is done in display boxes or street furniture components like mega-displays or billboards. To install these street furniture components on public ground, city councils have to approve them. To get these permissions (Europe, Asia and part of the US) services and fees are offered to the cities by the outdoor advertisers.
- In Europe there is a heavy competition to advertise in public spaces. This is due to the high potential for exposure and influence.
- Public advertising amenities must fit the broader architecture and urban planning rules of their cities. These requirements lead to interesting design approaches for poster presentation in different formats.
- Street furniture families were designed to fit these needs. Over the years they were completed with additional components like restrooms and automatic toilet facilities and kiosks to name a few.
- To finance this infrastructure long-term contracts (10 to 15 years) are signed between cities and outdoor advertising companies.
- Cities are often put in a situation to decide on new concepts when they are not familiar with the issues, since new contracts occur only very seldom. This knowledge gap is closed by a special advisor—the street furniture report.
- This advisor gives cities some independent ideas on how to act in this surrounding (rather than reacting) since public grounds can not be enlarged.

== Local significance ==
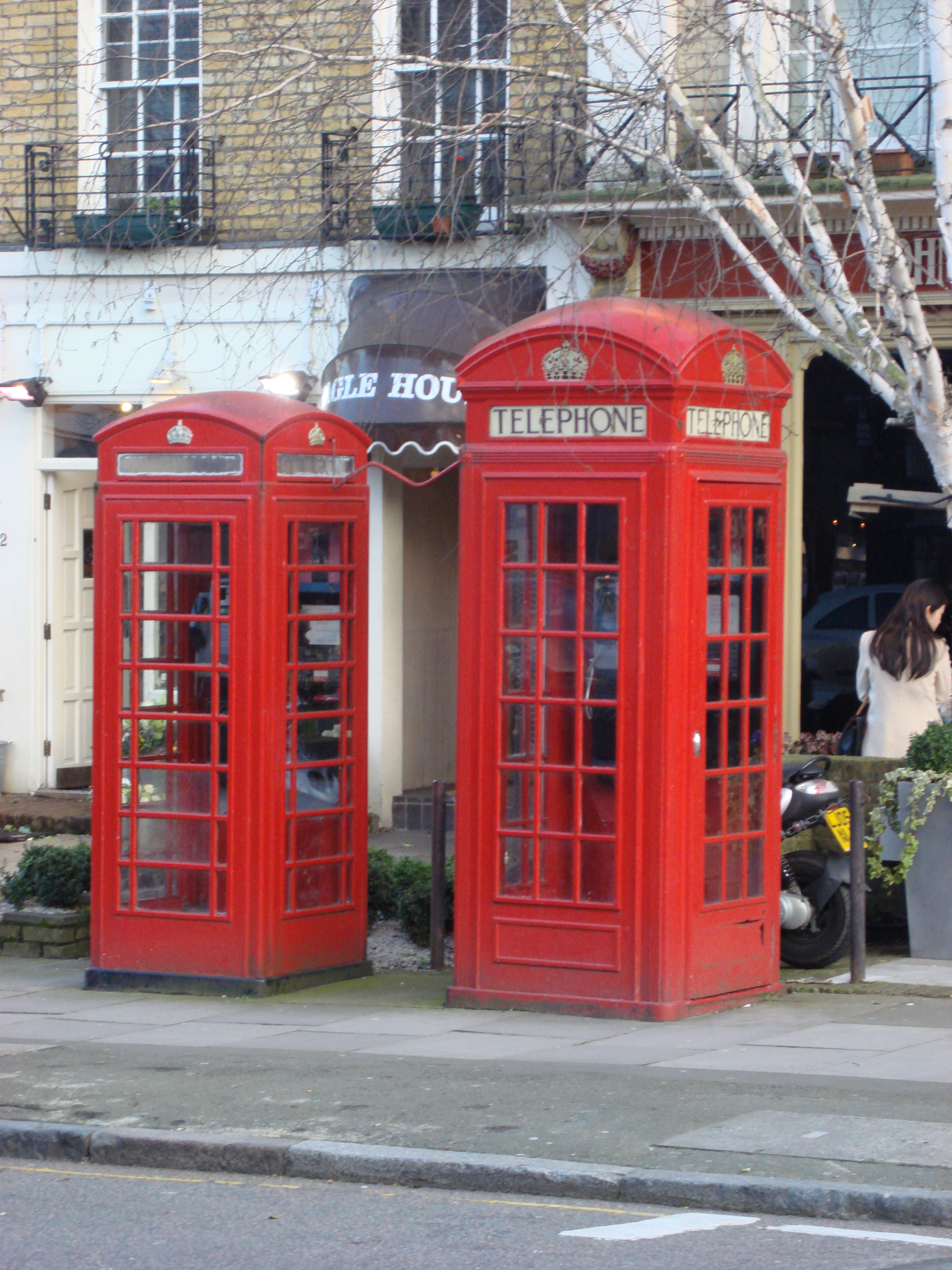
K2 and K6 (left) Red telephone boxes on St John's Wood High Street, London, England

Street furniture itself has become as much a part of many nations' identities as dialects and national events, so much so that one can usually recognise the location by their design; famous examples of this include:

- The red telephone boxes and pillar boxes of Britain
- The residential mail boxes of the United States
- The street lights and metro entrances of Paris.

== Historical street furniture ==
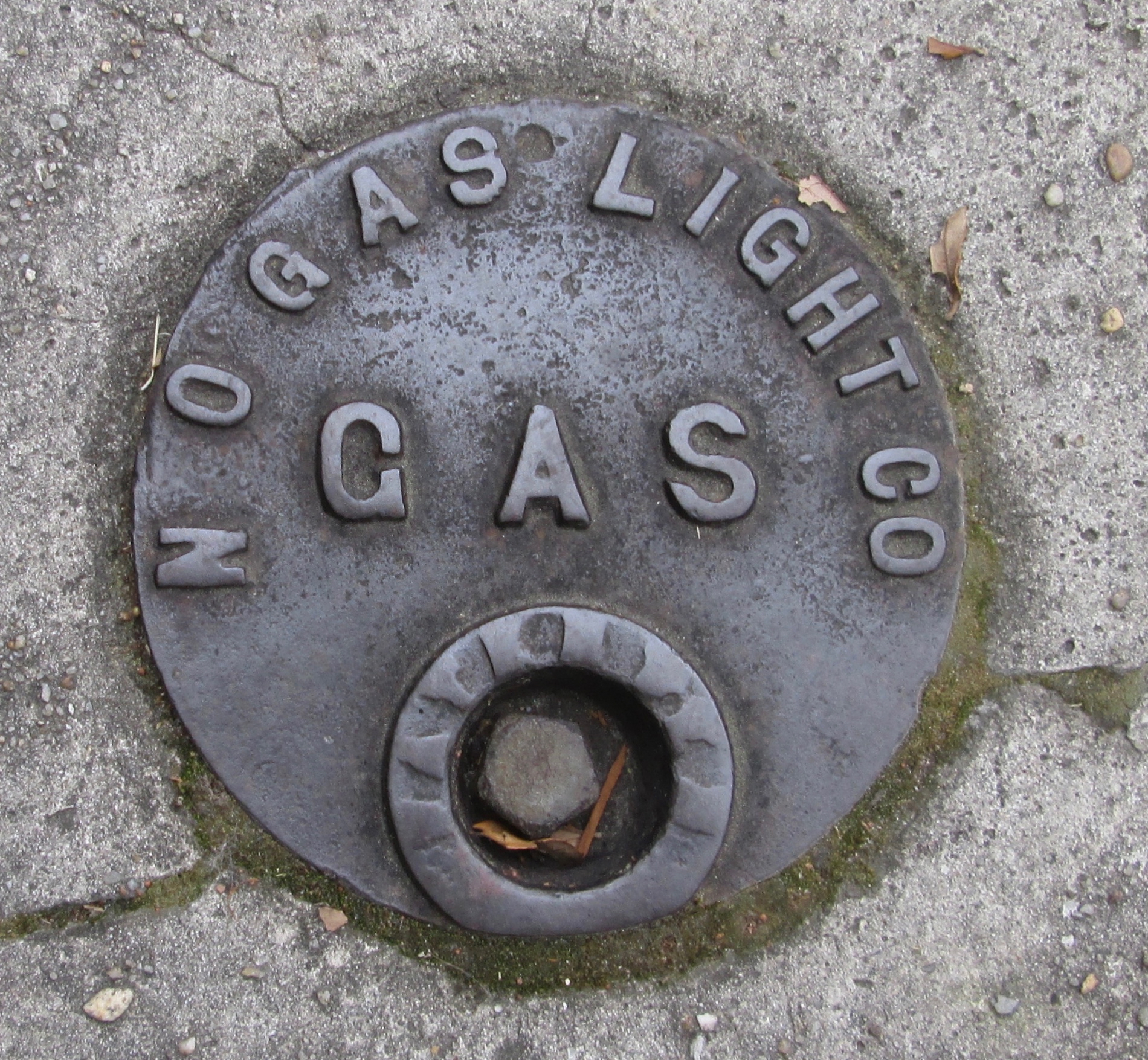
Sidewalk valve for long defunct gas lighting company, in Uptown New Orleans

Since most items of street furniture are of a utilitarian nature, authorities generally keep them up-to-date and replace them regularly (usually to conform to regulations, safety codes, etc.). Because of this, old, outdated, obsolete, or even non-functional street furniture can be rare sights and hold a special fascination and inspire nostalgia for many people.

The Tiergarten park in Berlin has a collection of antique streetlamps from around the world, both gas and electric.

== Telecommunication ==
Some concealed cell sites disguise the tower with a structure that can fit into street furniture.

Large displays in central streets can provide information, advertise events or products, or warn citizens about potential problems. Interactive displays can show information on key places and monuments and allow parking payments. They can serve as a cell site with low visual impact.

Some cell sites have a structure that make it look pleasant. In this case it is not concealed but highlighted, becoming a part of the street furniture that can be admired by citizens.

The use of power from renewable sources may be a design criterion.

== See also ==
- Beach furniture
- Bus stop
- Curb mining
- Door furniture
- Garden furniture
- Historical marker
- Microconnect distributed antenna
- Park furniture
- Pissoir
- Public art
