= Advertising column =

Sidewalk structure for advertising

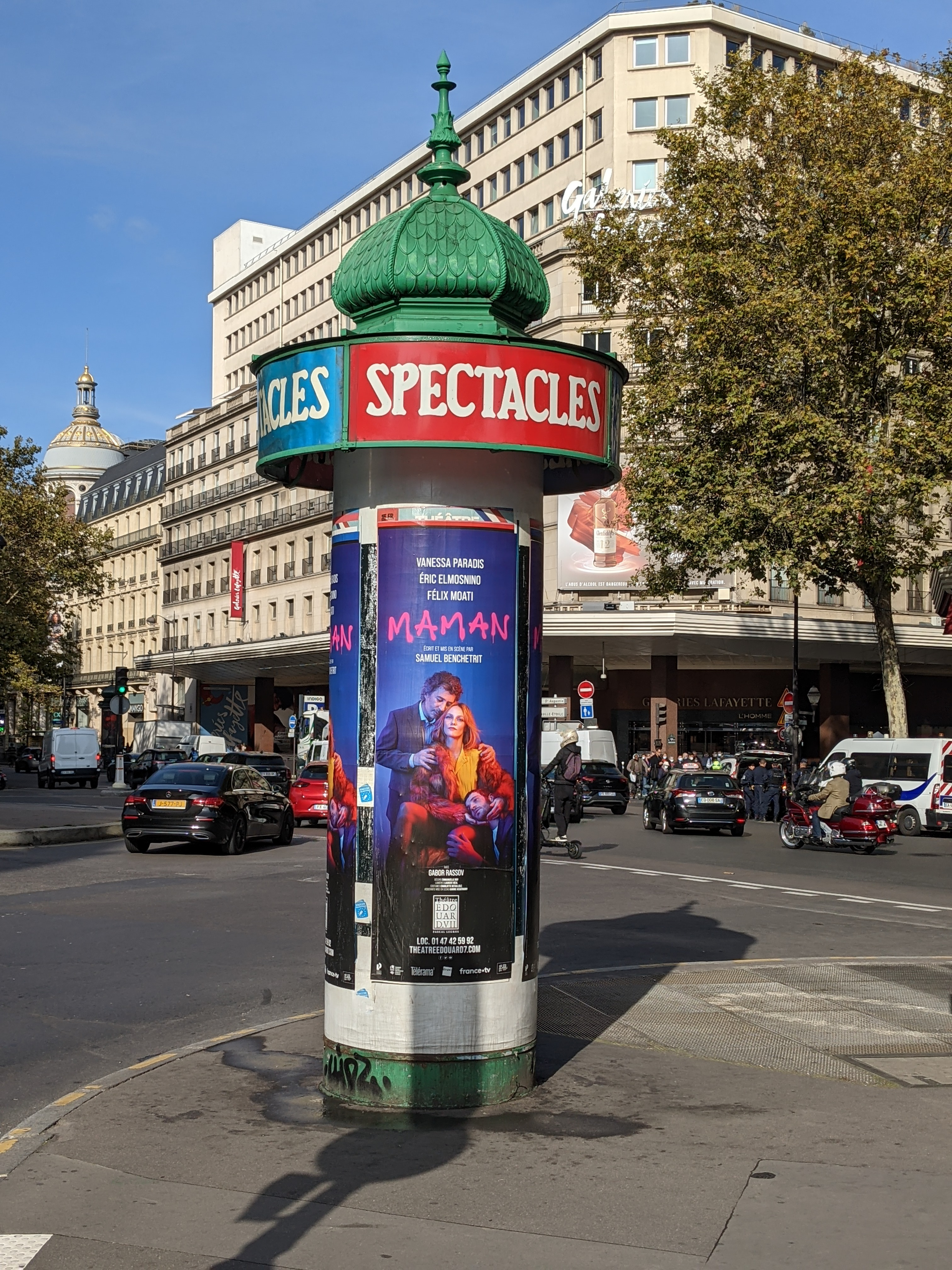
A Morris column in la place Diaghilev, Paris

An advertising column is a cylindrical outdoor sidewalk structure with a characteristic style that is used for advertising and other purposes. They are common throughout Germany including its capital Berlin, where the first 100 columns were installed in 1855. Advertising columns were invented by the German printer Ernst Litfaß in 1854. Therefore, they are known as Litfass columns (German: Litfaßsäulen, singular Litfaßsäule).

In France, they are called Morris columns (French: colonnes Morris) after Gabriel Morris, a printer, who held the concession for advertising in 1868. They were originally built by La Société Fermière des Colonnes Morris. Today, they are mostly built and maintained by the JCDecaux company, which purchased the original company in 1986. At the beginning of 2006, there were 790 Morris columns in Paris; more than two hundred were to be removed.

== Development ==
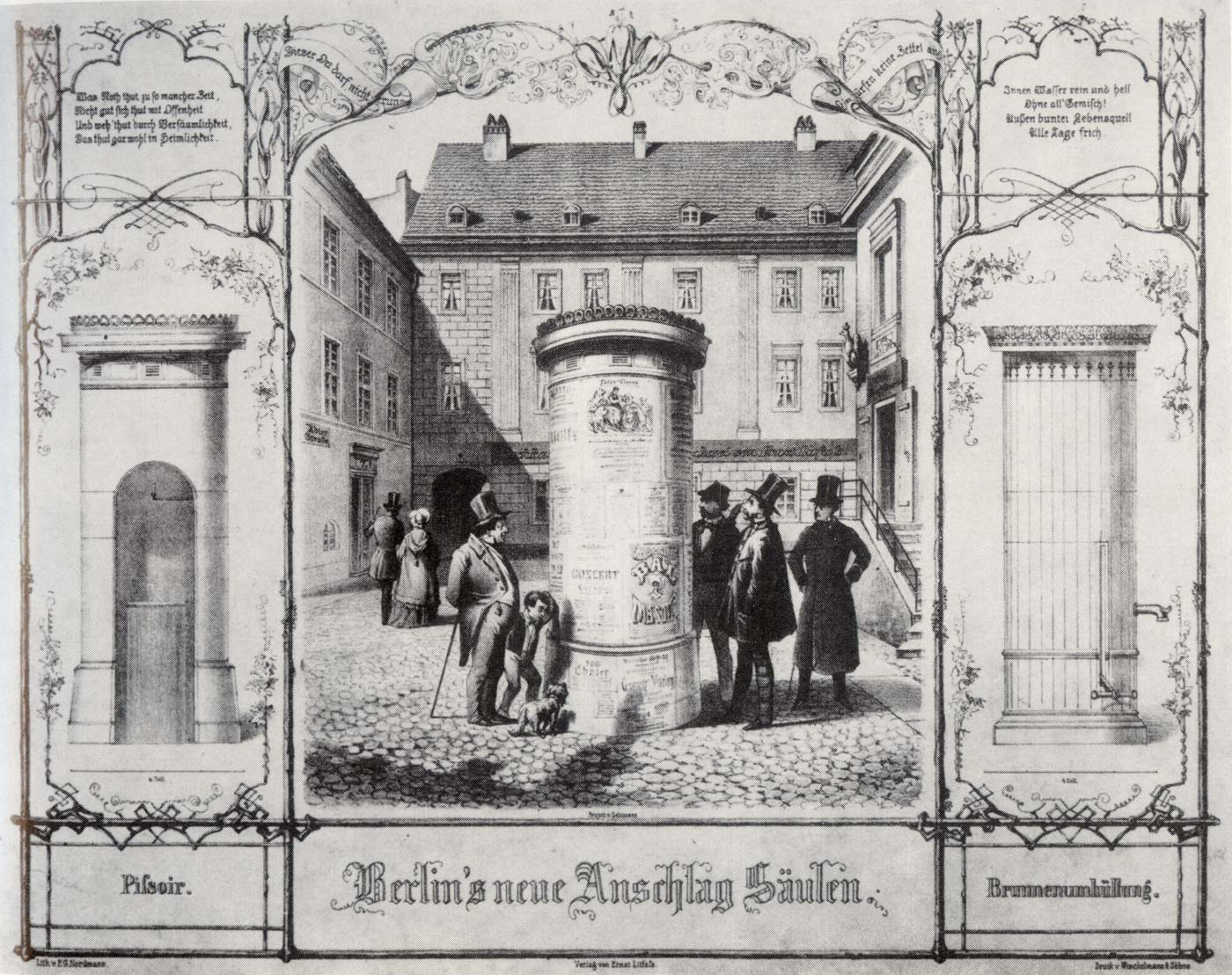
First advertising column by Ernst Litfaß in Berlin

The idea of advertising pillars came about in order to combat rampant advertising and graffiti. Ernst Litfaß suggested that pillars should be built all over Berlin. People could then place their advertisements on these pillars. On 5 December 1854, after years of proceedings, Berlin's chief of police, Karl Ludwig von Hinkeldey authorized Litfaß' Annoncier-Säulen. Litfaß had exclusive rights to build these columns until 1865.

== Purposes ==
Advertising columns are typically used to display advertisements in the form of posters, mainly theater, cinema, nightclub, and concert announcements. Some are motorized and rotate very slowly, and others house Sanisettes or telephone booths.

In 2017, anti-pollution Morris columns were tested in Paris; they contained materials which filter out particles from the air in order to mitigate carbon dioxide pollution.

== See also ==
- Billboard
- Street furniture
