= Oeconomische Encyclopädie =

242-volume German language encyclopedia started by Johann Georg Krünitz

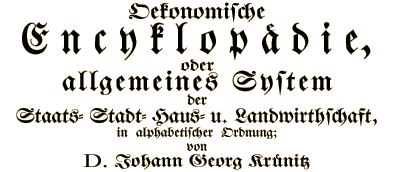
Reproduction of the title (from the online version; is not an exact facsimile of any real title page)

The Oeconomische Encyclopädie was a German language encyclopedia started by Johann Georg Krünitz. It appeared in 242 volumes between 1773 and 1858. Each volume has about 600–800 pages, giving a total of about 170,000 pages.

It was originally planned to be a translation of two French-language encyclopaedias, Dictionnaire raisonné universel d'histoire naturelle (1764) and Encyclopédie Oeconomique ou Système général d'Oeconomie rustique, domestique et politique (1771–1772), but developed into a separate work that much surpassed the originals. Significant parts were also based on the Grosses vollständiges Universal-Lexicon by Johann Heinrich Zedler.

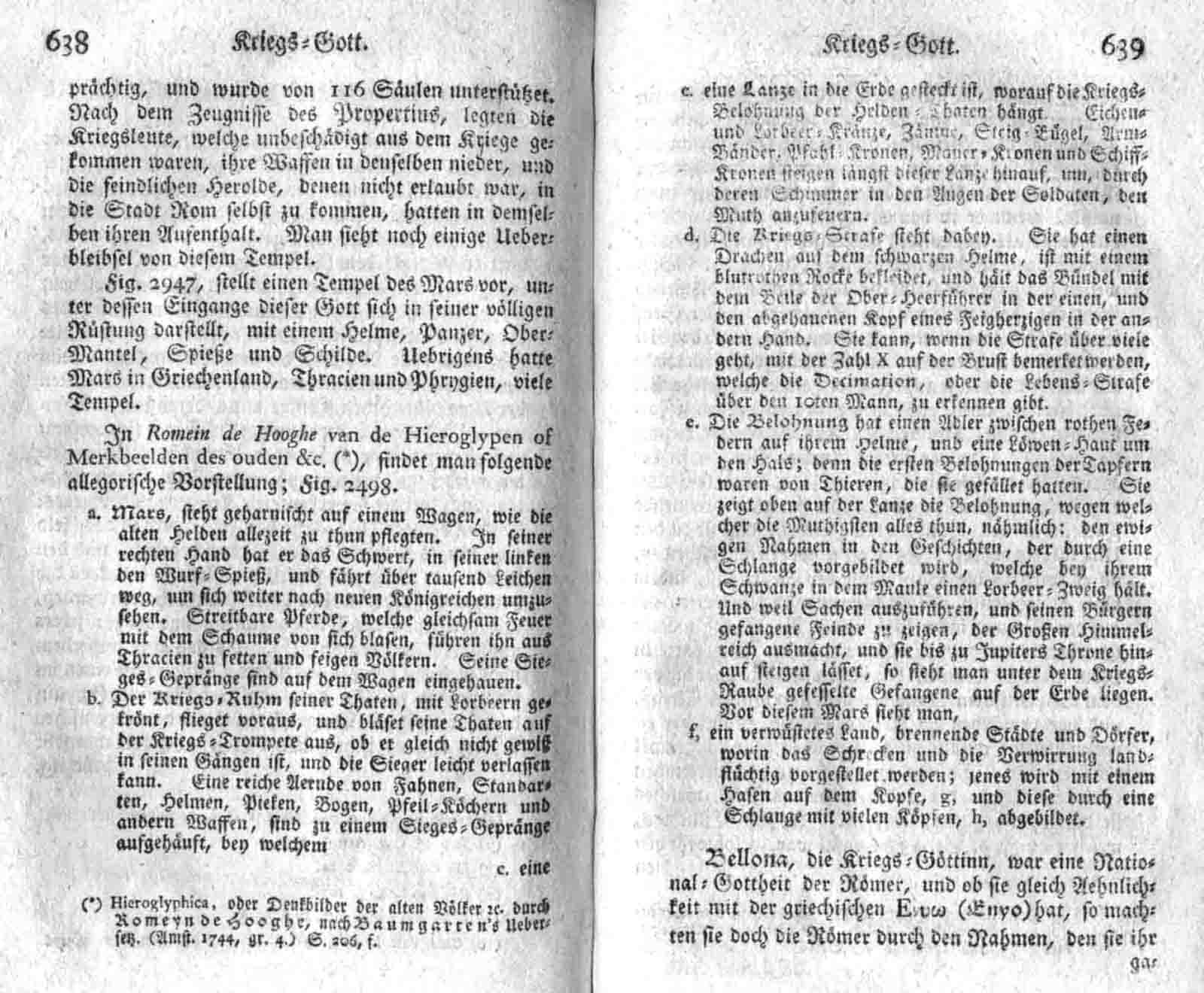
Pages 638–639 of vol. 50 (1790)

Krünitz managed to finish 72 volumes during his lifetime. It is said that he died while working on the article Leiche (corpse). After his death (1796) Friedrich Jakob Floerken (1758–1799) took over the preparation of volumes 73–77, until he died too. His brother Heinrich Gustav Flörke continued from 1800 to 1813 with volumes 78–123. From 1813 to 1855, Johann Wilhelm David Korth (1783–1861) edited volumes 124–225, at times supported by co-authors Ludwig Kossarski and Carl Otto Hoffmann. Hoffmann then completed the work from 1855 to 1858 with volumes 226–242.

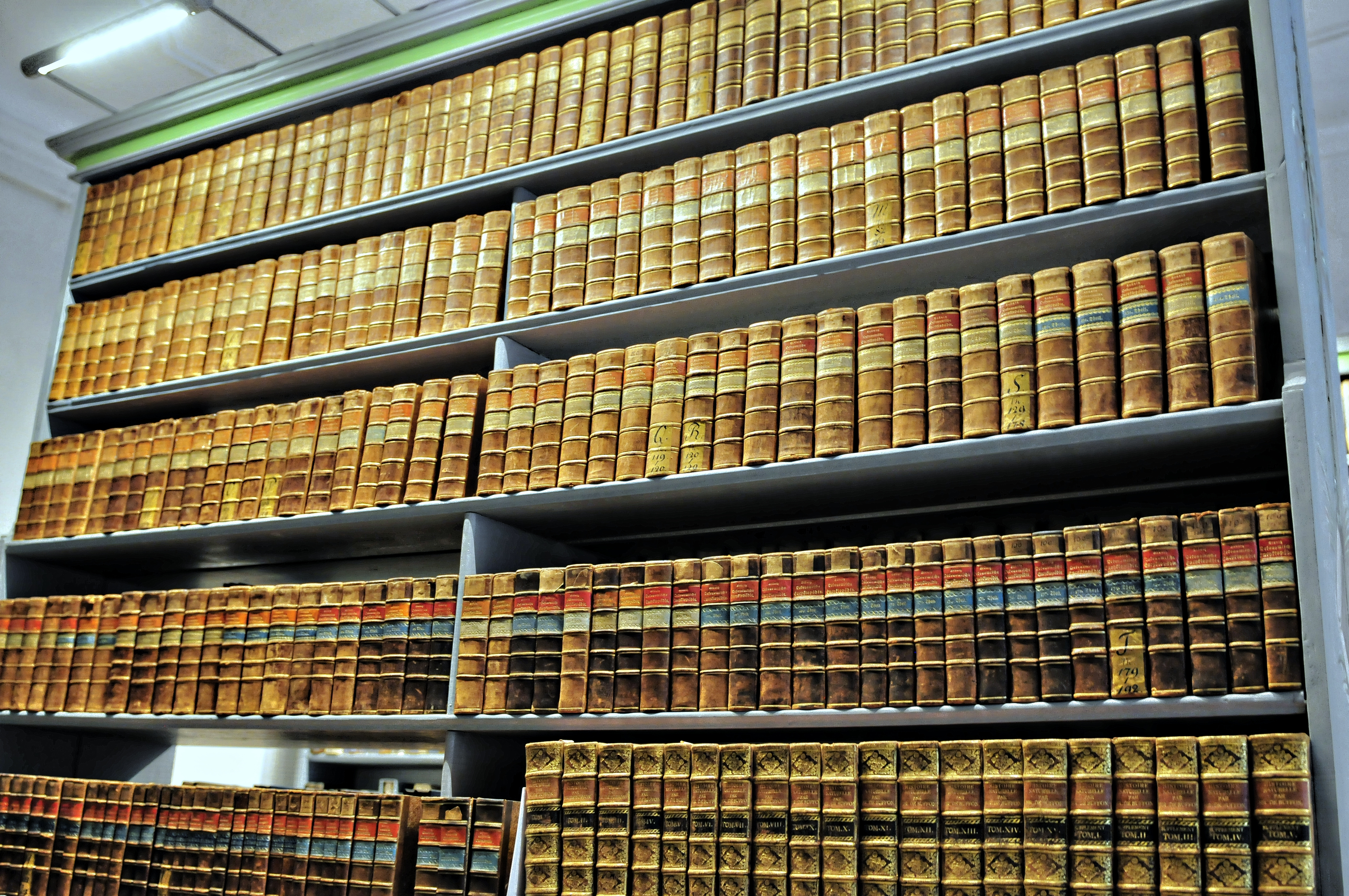
A complete edition of the Oekonomische Encyklopädie at the Oberlausitzische Bibliothek der Wissenschaften in Görlitz

Publishers of the "Krünitz" were successively Joachim Pauli (1773–1812), his widow Louise Pauli (1812–1823), her second husband C.H. Mowinkel (1823–c. 1830), Leopold Wilhelm Krause (c. 1830–1846), and finally Krause's stepson Ernst Litfaß (1846–1858).

The full title was:

- originally: Oekonomische Encyklopädie, oder allgemeines System der Land- Haus- und Staats-Wirthschaft in alphabetischer Ordnung ("Economic Encyclopaedia, or general system of agriculture, domestic and state economy in alphabetical order")
- volumes 33–73 and 77–242: Oekonomisch-technologische Encyklopädie, oder allgemeines System der Staats- Stadt- Haus- und Landwirthschaft und der Kunstgeschichte... ("Economic-Technological Encyclopaedia, or general system of state, city, domestic economy and agriculture and of art history...")
- volumes 74–76: Oekonomisch-technologische Encyklopädie, oder allgemeines System der Staats- Stadt- Haus- und Landwirthschaft, wie auch der Erdbeschreibung, Kunst- und Naturgeschichte... ("Economic-Technological Encyclopaedia, or general system of state, city, domestic economy and agriculture as well as of geography, art and natural history...")
