= Ernst Litfaß =

German printer and publisher (1816–1874)

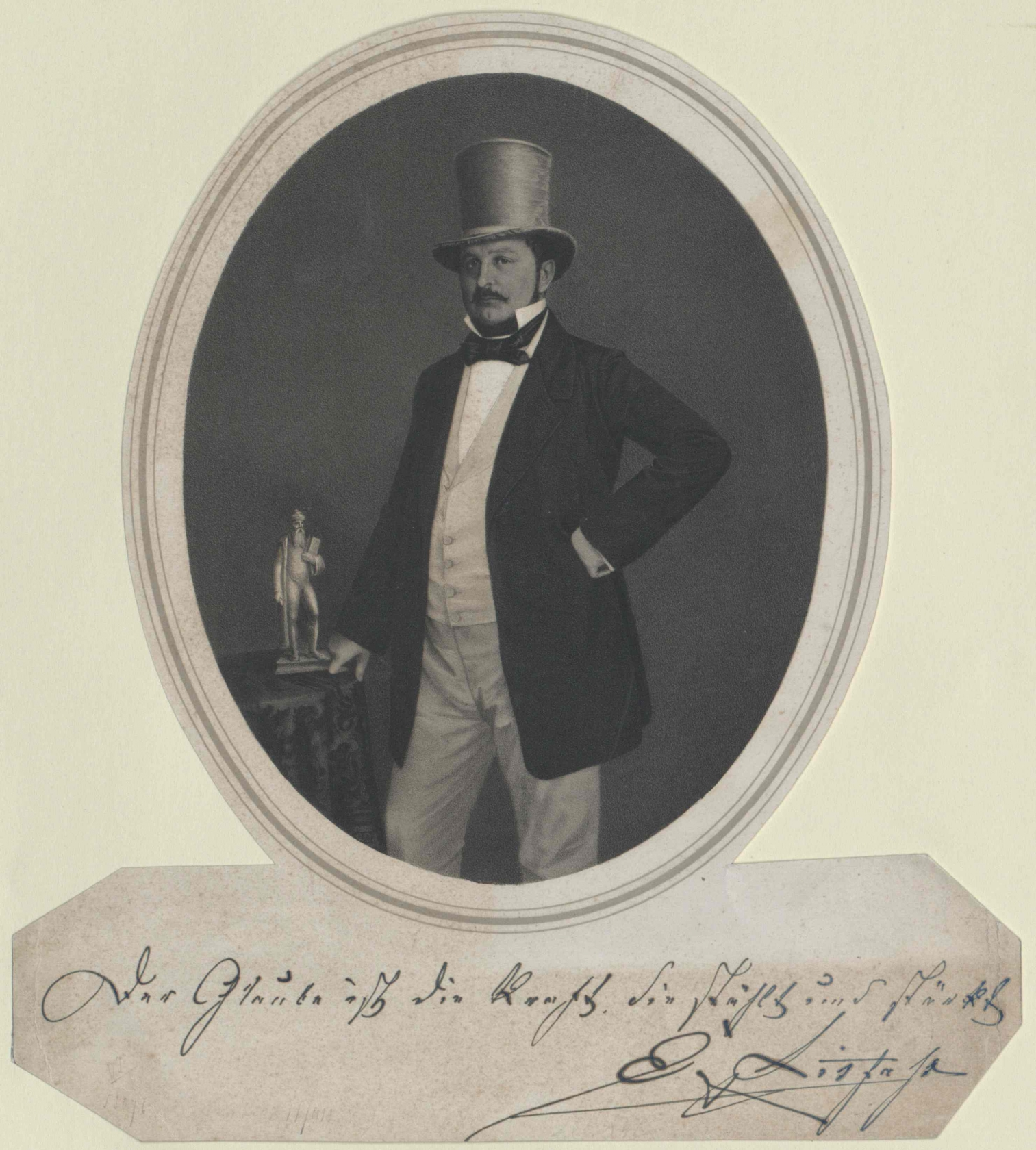
- Ernst Litfaß in 1855
- Born: Ernst Amandus Theodor Litfaß; 11 February 1816
- Died: 27 December 1874 (aged 58)
- Occupations: Printer, publisher

Ernst Amandus Theodor Litfaß (or Litfass; German pronunciation: [ˈlɪtfas]; (Note: Litfaß is a proper name and thus not affected by the German spelling reform although the a in Litfaß is a short vowel and the following ß would otherwise have to be turned into an ss. Accordingly, Litfaß is still correct, while Litfass is acceptable in non-German contexts.) 11 February 1816 – 27 December 1874) was a German printer and publisher. He invented the free-standing cylindrical advertising column which bears his name in German (Litfaßsäule).

== Biography ==
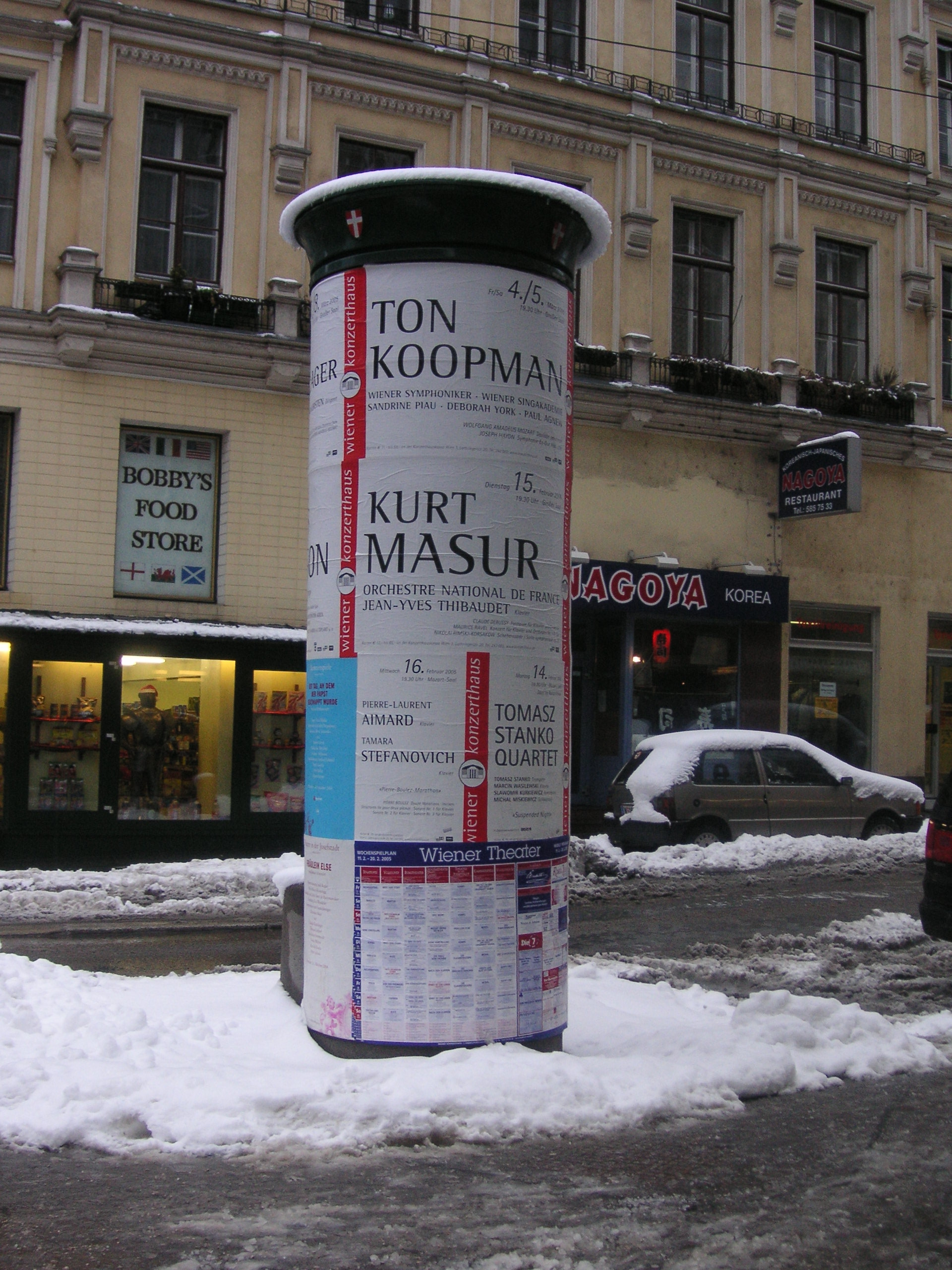
A Litfaßsäule in Vienna, Austria. The advertisements are for concerts with Ton Koopman and Kurt Masur respectively; at the bottom there is the weekly programme of the theatres of Vienna.

Born in Berlin, Litfaß took over his stepfather's business in 1845 and became the editor of a number of newspapers and pamphlets. As publisher, he completed, in 1858, the edition of the Oekonomische Encyklopädie (in 242 volumes), which had been started by Johann Georg Krünitz in 1773.

Litfaß gave his name to the advertising pillars he invented in 1854. These were made of concrete, 3 m high and hollow. Over 50,000 appeared in Berlin and other German cities.

Litfaß supported wounded veterans of the wars of 1864, 1866 and 1870–71 and their relatives by sponsoring concerts, fireworks and boat tours, then donating the proceeds to charities.

Litfaß died during a spa treatment in Wiesbaden and was buried in an honorary grave in the Dorotheenstadt cemetery in Berlin.

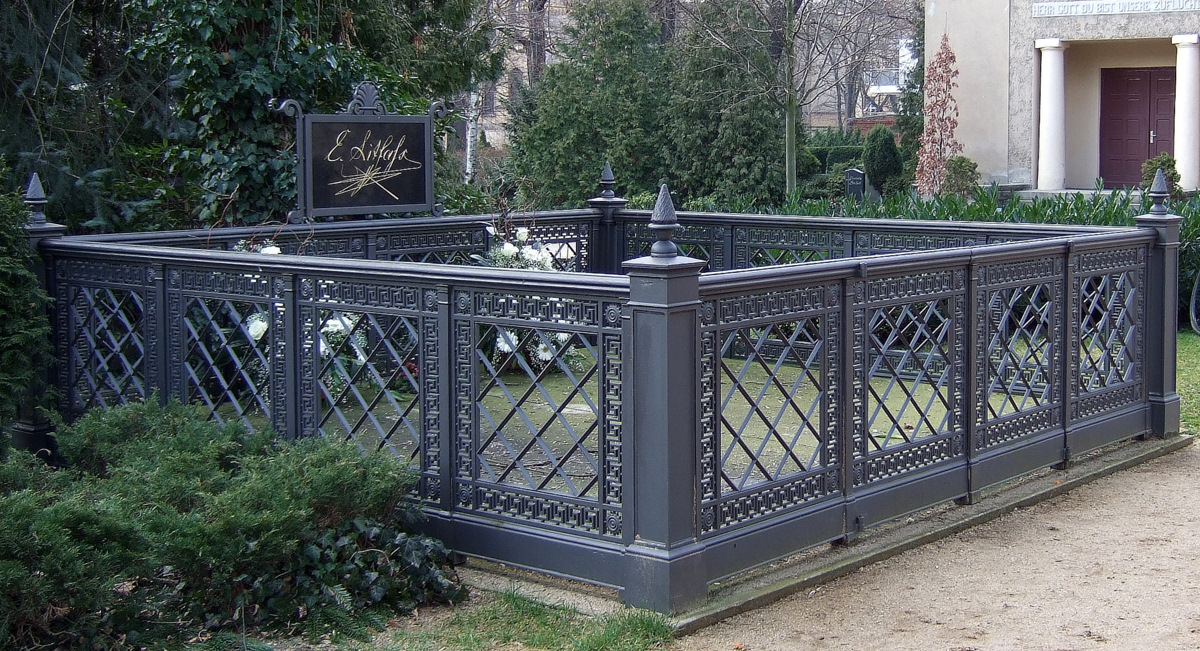
Litfaß's grave in Berlin

== Litfaß-Säule ==
In 1854 Litfaß proposed putting up columns in the streets of Berlin for announcement and advertising purposes. Allegedly, he was disgusted by the unsystematic and ubiquitous posting of pamphlets, notices and other materials on walls, doors, fences and trees. In December that year he was granted permission to erect such Annoncier-Säulen columns, and on 1 July 1855 the first 100 Litfaß-Säulen were presented in Berlin. Hungarian composer Béla Kéler composed Litfass Annoncir-Polka for this occasion.

Litfaß had a monopoly on his advertising columns and grew rich fast. After his death in Wiesbaden in 1874, the idea of putting up Litfaßsäulen (Litfaß columns or Litfaß pillars) quickly spread to other German cities. Today, they can be found in other countries as well.

Later developments include the electrically powered slowly revolving column; columns that serve as vents for underground services; and columns with a hidden door, used for storage (tools for street sweeping, electrical appliances, etc.).

A famous Litfaßsäule was located in the western Berlin district of Wilmersdorf. It featured on the cover of the 1929 children's novel Emil and the Detectives by Erich Kästner. The pillar, the story goes, was used by the child investigator Emil Tischbein to hide from a suspected criminal. The site of the original pillar, long since demolished, still regularly attracts tourists.

== Cultural references ==
- In the movie The Third Man, Harry Lime (played by Orson Welles) uses one of these columns as an escape route to the sewer system under Vienna.
- In the movie Gremlins 2, Billy Peltzer (played by Zach Galligan) and Daniel Clamp (played by John Glover), use one of these columns as an escape route from the Gremlin-infested Clamp Building.
- In the movie Men in Black II, Agent K (played by Tommy Lee Jones) and Agent J (played by Will Smith), use a column as an escape route from an alien-infested MiB Headquarters.

== See also ==
- Advertising column
- Kiosk
