= Entranceway at Main Street at High Park Boulevard =

- U.S. National Register of Historic Places
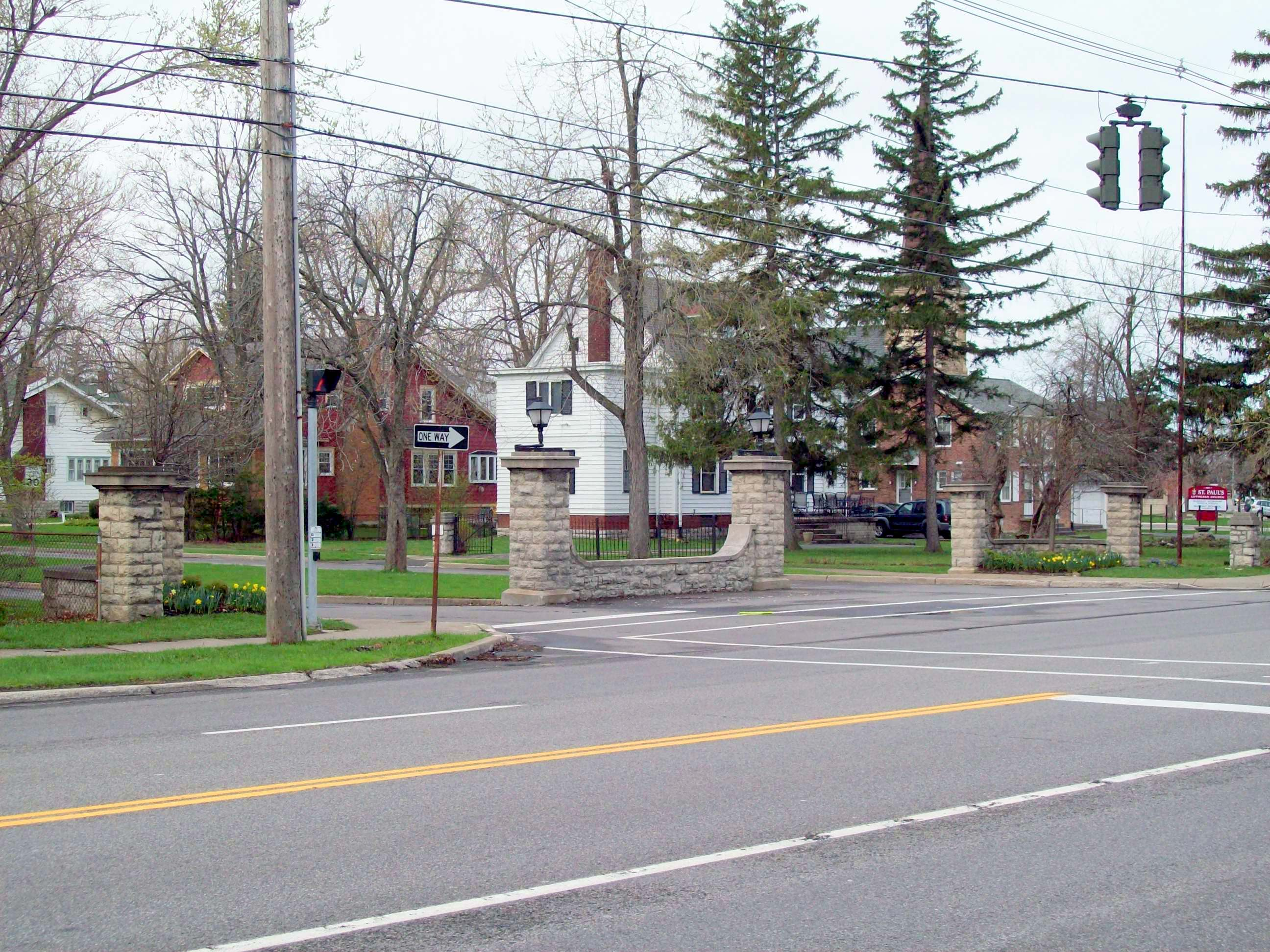
- Entranceway at Main Street at High Park Boulevard, April 2010

- Location within New York Location within the United States
- Location: Main St., jct. with High Park Boulevard, Amherst, New York
- Coordinates: 42°57′52.15″N 78°48′1.33″W
- Built: 1916
- Architect: Burkhardt, Charles S.
- MPS: Suburban Development of Buffalo, New York MPS
- NRHP reference No.: 09000555
- Added to NRHP: July 23, 2009

Entranceway at Main Street at High Park Boulevard is a suburban residential subdivision entranceway built about 1916 by developer Charles S. Burkhardt. It is located on Main Street (New York State Route 5) at Eggertsville in the town of Amherst within Erie County. It consists of tall and short stone posts, corresponding quarter-height stone walls, and accent light fixtures set on either side of the streets' intersecting corners.

It was added to the National Register of Historic Places in 2009.

== See also ==
- Entranceway at Main Street at Darwin Drive
