= Paid prison labour =

Prisoner participation in paid work programs

Paid prison labour is the participation of convicted prisoners in either voluntary or mandatory paid work programs.

While in prison, inmates are expected to work in areas such as industry, institutional maintenance, service tasks and agriculture. The most common work assignments contribute to facility support, such as food service, groundwork, building maintenance and office administration. This work is performed on a full- or part-time basis. However, exceptions include inmates who are medically unable to work, involved in full-time Educational or vocational training programs, or deemed a security risk.

The benefits of paid labour for inmates may include heightened incentives for good behaviour, productivity and post-release skill development, in addition to improved emotional wellbeing. Prison institutions are benefited by minimised inmate idleness and potential for security issues, the completion of necessary maintenance tasks and reduced prison operating costs.

Labour obligations and wage rates vary across different countries. For instance, prison work assignments are prevalent in the United States, with over half of prisoners being assigned a work program. In Japan, labour is required of all prisoners but options concerning the type of work performed are permitted. Prisoners serving short sentences are not required to work in Austria, Luxembourg, Norway, Lebanon, Syria and Cuba.

Paid prison labour is also implemented differently across penal Institutions (i.e. minimum, medium and high-security prisons, correctional facilities and privatised prisons).

== Types of work ==
=== Maintenance ===
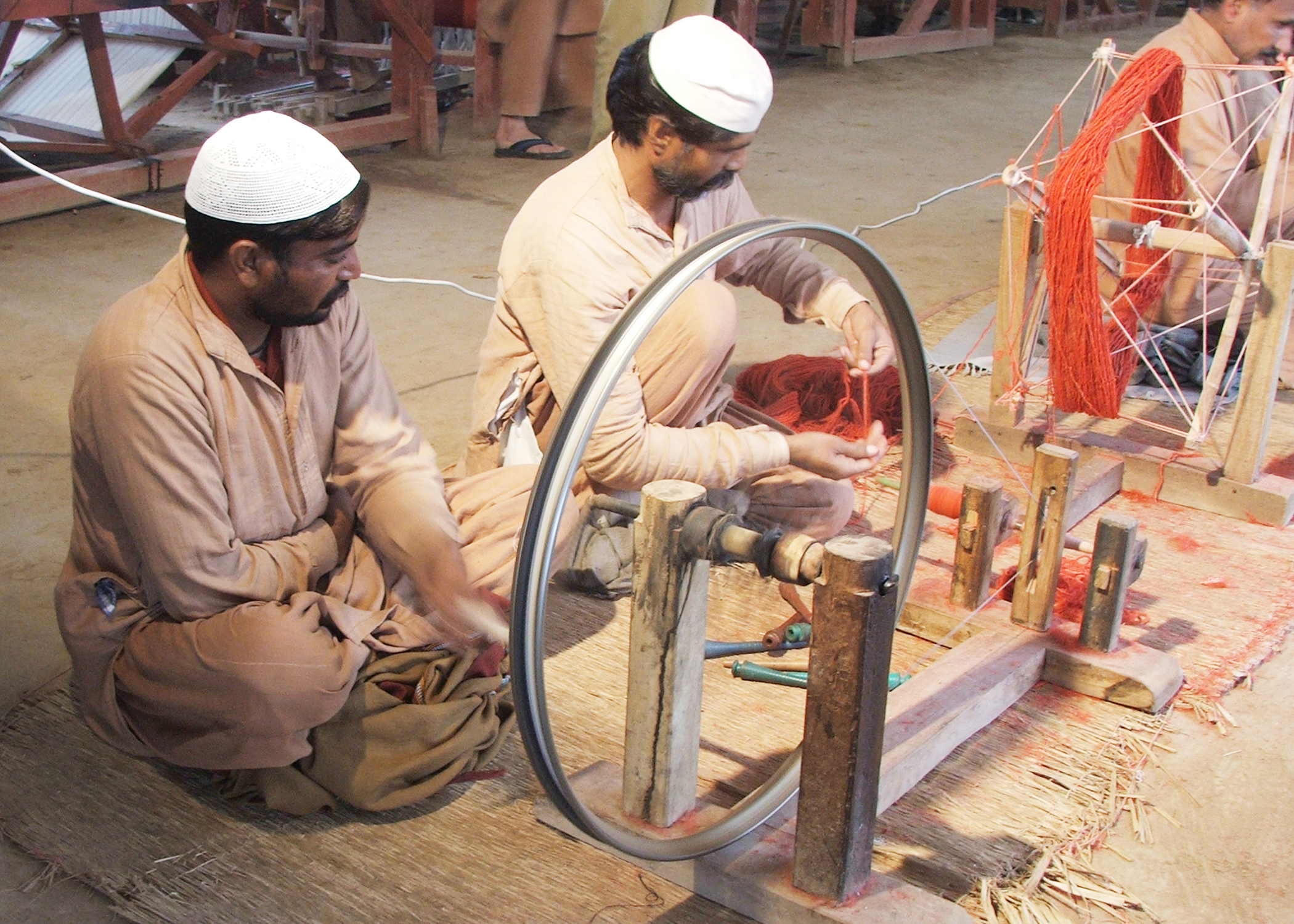
Prisoners working on a traditional manual Charkha in Pakistan, 2011

The majority of inmates are paid a wage for working in maintenance, custodial or service jobs within the prison. These tasks include cooking meals, maintaining the prison grounds, laundering inmate clothing, repairing boilers and conducting clerical work. On occasion, inmates are involved in labouring for public projects – for instance, assisting local communities to repair roads, clearing land and planting trees.

In the United States, work that supports the prison institution is managed by the Department of Corrections and remains the most common type of work assignment. This category of tasks is referred to as ‘facility’, ‘prison’ or ‘institutional’ jobs. The 1973 National Advisory Commission on Criminal Justice Standards and Goals define prisons as ‘labour-intensive public service organisations’ characterised by the involvement of paid inmates, contract service workers and employees.'

An inmate's knowledge, skills and their prisoner classification score are considered when making job assignments. In Australia, a prisoner's refusal to work negatively impacts their ‘Earned Incentive Plan’ level – this affects the provision of their inmate privileges, such as television, yard-time and family visits.

=== Industrial ===
Prisoners perform industrial work for prisons and private companies. This work involves providing services for sale to government agencies, state-owned or private sector businesses (e.g. data entry, automobile repair) and manufacturing products (e.g. automobile tags, furniture and mattresses). Goods and services are sold at prices designed to cover production costs and business or prison operations. Often called ‘correctional industries’, some businesses coordinate with correctional agencies to operate ‘shops,’ on which the generated revenues fund their operation.

Most US inmates are assigned to maintenance rather than industry work. A US nationwide 1991 American Correctional Association survey reported that only 8% of federal and state prisoners had research and industry type jobs. This distribution is a permanent feature of paid prison labour models – evidenced by a more recent 2017 figure indicating that agency-operated industries employ approximately 6% of prisoners.

=== External ===
Some prison labour programs provide opportunities for inmates to work outside the prison facility. These activities include work release programs, work camps and community work centres that provide services for public and non-profit agencies. In the U.S., these programs are directed by the Department of Corrections and are typically reserved for lower-security risk prisoners and/or those preparing to be released.

On the condition that an inmate is physically and mentally capable, participation in these work programs is designed to benefit the community, the Department of Corrections and the inmates themselves. Since 1934, UNICOR has partnered with the U.S. Federal Bureau of Prisons. UNICOR operates 83 factories, employing more than 12,000 prisoners for up to US$1.15 per hour to assemble, weld and fabricate products.

== Wage payment ==
Prisons generally incorporate a no-cash system, meaning any amount of money an inmate possesses or earns is stored in a bank account managed by the correctional facility. The accumulated amount of money that a prisoner earns, brings into prison and is sent from family or friends may be used to make purchases (i.e. at the canteen). Any remaining credit is given to the prisoner upon release. During their time in prison, inmates are entitled to monthly printouts of their electronic account balance.

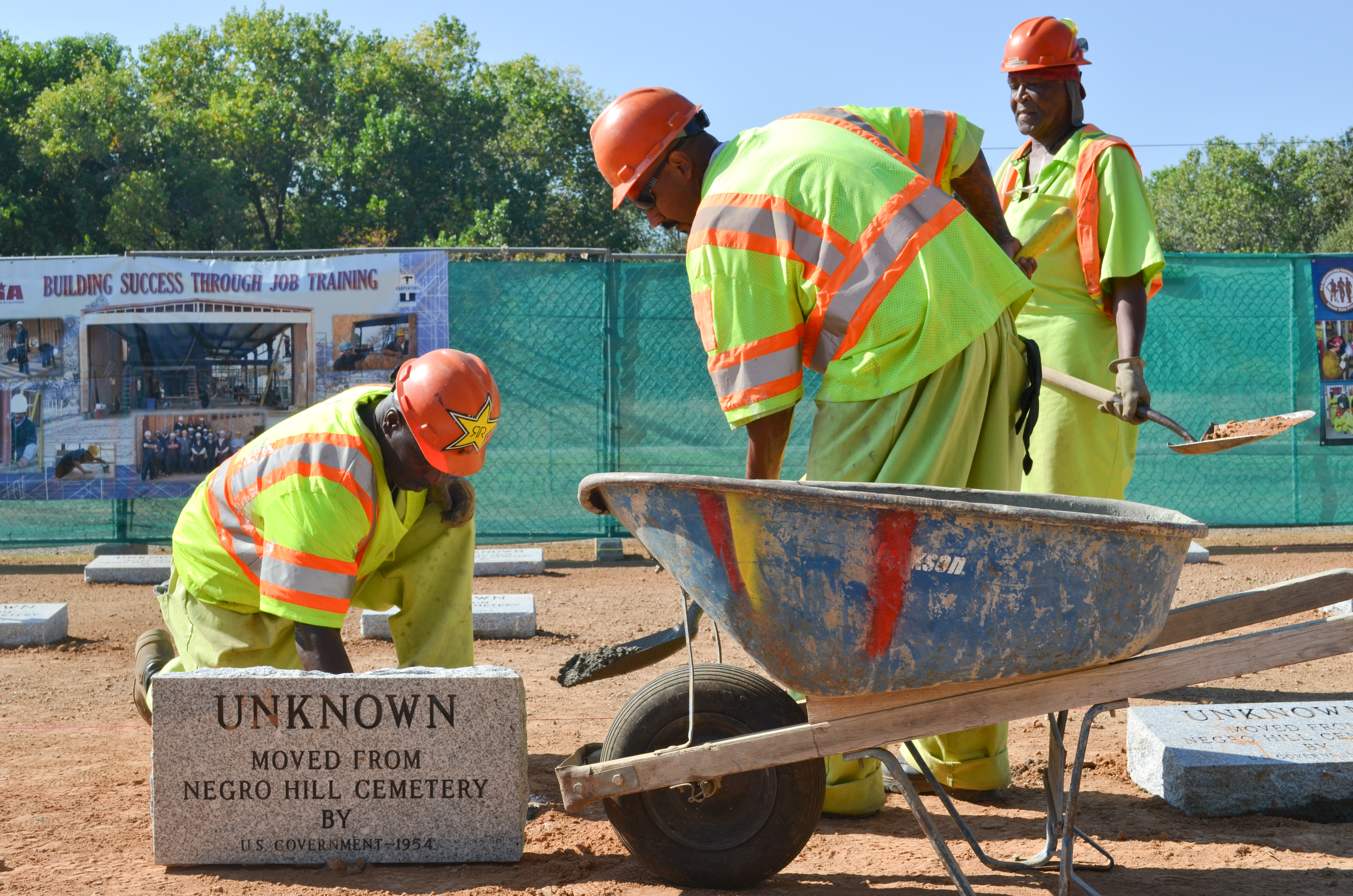
Folsom Prison inmates replacing grave markers at Mormon Island Cemetery, 2011

Electronic kiosks are emerging as a more efficient alternative to the traditional paper-based system. Predominantly in private prisons, automated kiosks allow inmates to check their account balance and place their canteen orders.

Methods of wage payment vary across prisons. Payment may be based on an hourly rate, cover a time period (i.e. monthly) or be determined on piece work. Inmates may also earn extra for overtime, the longevity of their employment or receive payments through workers’ accident compensation. Some correctional facilities pay prisoners for their participation in educational programs or vocational training.

In most cases, wage payments are made weekly based on an hourly rate. Attendance records are kept for all working prisoners. Within the wage levels attributed to each inmate's classification, workers generally begin on their determined minimum wage and proceed to the maximum level according to longevity or proficiency at work.

Prison labour wages are characteristically low. In the US, the average daily minimum wage for non-industry penal jobs was US$0.86 in 2017 compared to US$0.93 in 2001. The average daily maximum wage for industry-type work also declined from US$4.73 in 2001 to US$3.45 in 2017. Inmates working for state-owned businesses earned between US$0.33 and US$1.41 per hour in 2017 – about twice the amount paid to inmates who work regular prison jobs.

With a few exceptions, regular prison jobs (cleaning, groundskeeping, kitchen and clerical work) remain unpaid in the U.S. states of Florida, South Carolina, Georgia, Texas, Alabama and Arkansas.

== Spending wages ==
While incarcerated, individuals are provided free accommodation, basic toiletries, meals and required clothing. Inmates must purchase phone credit and other goods using the money earned and stored in their prison-managed bank accounts. Most commonly, spending is directed towards the canteen or prison shop.

In public prisons, canteens provide products such as tobacco, hobby materials, stationery, non-prescribed medication, additional food and toiletries. Prisoners may also purchase clothing or religious/cultural items from exclusive catalogues. In the UK, public sector prisons base their inventory on a national product list (NPL) of approved items. Prisons in the private sector generally rely on their own canteen system.

In some penal systems, the money that prisoners are allowed to spend is determined by their behaviour and rank on the Incentives and Earned Privileges (IEP) scheme – a system employed in England and Wales. Within this national scheme, the maximum a prisoner can spend per week is £25; however, most prisoners are limited to £15.50. According to their custody level and individual spending limit, inmates may purchase hygiene products, candy, vitamins and supplements, clothing and desk lamps.

Prisoners can purchase goods using canteen sheets that indicate the available products and attached pricing. Completed orders are sent to a courier service – primarily DHL international couriers –whose staff ship the goods to the prison over the following week. In the U.S., money withdrawal requests are made by completing an ‘Inmate Request’ form, which allows inmates to spend money on television rentals, postage, magazine subscriptions, legal fees and charitable contributions.

Prisoners can purchase clothes and other items not included on the canteen sheet – for instance, DVDs and CDs from catalogues such as Amazon. Most prisons attach an administration fee to cover the associated processing and delivery costs of these external orders.

== Different systems ==
=== United States ===
Work programs operate in 88% of prisons in the United States and employ approximately 775,000 prisoners. The vast majority of inmates are employed in support and maintenance roles, delivering mail, washing dishes and doing laundry. In the federal prison system, pay rates for these jobs range between US$0.12 to US$0.40 per hour. A smaller 4% of the U.S. prison population work in ‘correctional industries’, producing goods and services which are then sold externally to government agencies, Schools and non-profit organisations. U.S. states have their own correctional programs, while the federal system operates in partnership with the UNICOR initiative.

Across the U.S., receipt of wage payment and the amount of this payment differs. In most cases, the state and the Federal Bureau of Prisons (BOP) provide compensation for working prisoners; however, some states (e.g. Texas) do not pay prisoners for labour and others (e.g. Florida) generally only pay inmates involved in industry jobs. A relatively low number of incarcerated individuals work for private businesses, with only 6% of state and 16% of federal prisoners working in association with private companies of the approximately 2,220,300 prisoners in the United States.

Wages earned by inmates in the U.S. are credited to their electronic bank accounts bi-weekly. Court-ordered or statutorily mandated deductions such as filing fees, child support, transition and restriction fees may be derived from these bi-weekly wage payments.

Triggered by the Prison Industry Enhancement Act in 1979, a wave of U.S. legislation re-authorised paid prison labour. It dictated that prisoners in all 50 states must work during their incarceration. The private use of inmate labour remains prohibited in various international conventions, for instance, the ILO 1930 Convention Against Forced Labour. However, private use is permissible in the U.S. through federal and state laws, which are grounded in the 13th Constitutional amendment abolishing slavery except as a punishment for a crime.

=== United Kingdom ===
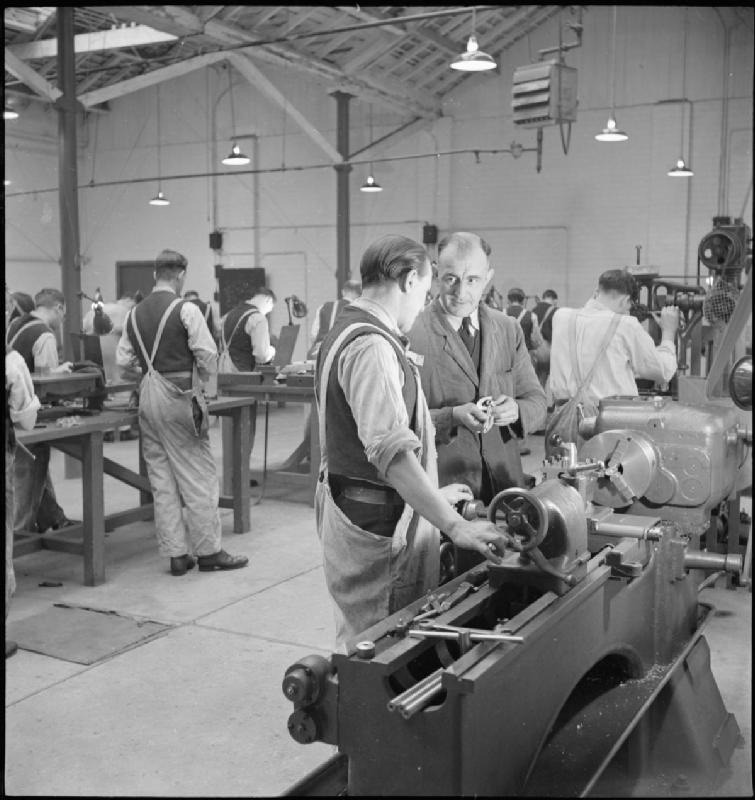
Inmate Training and Work in Wakefield Prison, Britain, 1944

Prison systems within the United Kingdom require ‘purposeful activity’ of all inmates who are mentally and physically capable. Not necessarily paid labour, this activity consists of education and training, commercial Workshops and service tasks such as cleaning or mentoring. Under the national system, a limited group of prisoners are entitled to be released on Temporary licences and employed by external organisations. For inmates who fail to participate in purposeful activity, retirement pay is available for prisoners over the national retirement age and a base unemployment amount of £2.50 (minimum per week) is paid to those who are unable to work.

The 1964 Prison Service Guidelines declare that individuals may receive financial compensation for the purposeful activity they perform while incarcerated. The current minimum rate of pay in the United Kingdom was issued in 2002 and is set in Prison Service Order 4460 – it mandates that inmates involved in a type of work program must earn a minimum weekly wage of £4. Unconvicted prisoners (those yet to be found innocent or guilty) who are involved in work programs are paid a wage equal to that of convicted prisoners, while those who choose not to work are supplied a base unemployment rate. In the United Kingdom, the average working prisoner earns about £10 per week.

The U.K National Product List (NPL) consists of roughly 1,000 products, featuring a variety of products such as fresh fruit and tinned produce to tobacco, stamps and Greeting cards. Purchased in bulk by DHL, public prisons select and order 375 items from the NPL to form a Local Product List (LPL). Supermarket branded products are generally cheaper than those on the NPL and some products are often not available on a particular prison's LPL.

=== Australia ===
Within the Australian penal system, all convicted individuals are required to participate in paid labour as a necessary procedure for inmate development and effective correctional management. Although not expected to work, unconvicted inmates are encouraged to involve themselves in programs tailored to self-development.

The Australian system provides uniform wages across all federal prisons based on a five-day 30-hour working week. The ceiling wage per week is AU$70.2. It is provided in exchange for prisoner labour in the areas of general maintenance (construction, electrical and plumbing), domestic services (sweepers, sanitising), cooking services (for inmate meals) laundry or cleaning tasks. Prisoners who work extended hours due to deadlines or involvement in seven-day, 42-hour per week positions, may accrue earnings beyond AU$70.2. Wages are reviewed annually by the Director Operations Development branch of Australia's Corrective Services.

The Australian system also offers community-based employment positions for inmates to participate in. For instance, as indigenous representatives, library clerks and tutors, as well as clerical support for industry managers and educational program coordinators. Incentives and rewards are routinely provided for prisoners who are involved in work and other programs aimed at self-development.

=== Europe ===
Across Eastern and Western Europe, paid prison labour is organised in different ways with different wage implications. Generally, European penal systems serve the goal of providing work as a positive and productive aspect of incarceration rather than punishment. European prison regimes allow inmates to work for both private companies and the prison administration, although this availability is determined by each particular country's mandate and workplace options. The availability of paid work in Europe is increasingly low. For instance, approximately only 5,300 labour roles are offered to 12,500 prisoners in Greece, while in Italy there is only one inmate out of five who is entitled to paid work.

In France, approximately 17,800 inmates perform paid labour while incarcerated. Half of these prisoners are involved in prison administration work or programs supporting private firms for privatised prisons. In addition to basic maintenance and meal distribution jobs, prisoners also have the opportunity to carry out simple and repetitive production jobs in workshops or their cells. The availability of what tasks inmates can perform and where they may do so is often dependent on the inmate's security and privileges status. Prisoners in France who work the equivalent to a full-time employee generally earn an average of €330 per month. This earning is then heavily levied between 20 and 25% for victim compensation. The remaining amount is levied further by 10% to be placed in a separate bank account only available to the inmate on their release date. A similar system of deductions is implemented across various European countries, including Portugal and Spain. Prison institutions in Portugal and Spain host the opportunity for vocational training programs, although, in Portugal, turnover rates in these programs are high.

Prisons in Poland and Latvia incorporate unpaid work into their regimes, where volunteer and mandated work in the kitchen or maintenance areas are commonplace. As opposed to financial compensation, prisons in Greece often reduce prisoners’ sentence length in exchange for their labour.

=== Japan ===
Assigned labour is considered a priority in Japan's correctional system. By law, if a prisoner refuses work or neglects their labour responsibility, punishment is to be implemented. Work hours consist of eight hours each day over the Monday-Friday period and four hours on Saturdays – although individual cases may extend or limit these procedures. In most prisons, inmates who perform paid work are paid for their activity. This is calculated per the individual's standard hourly wage based on their assigned labour level.

There are ten levels in Japan's penal labour system, ranging from class ten (trainee) to class one (the highest level of promotion). New workers begin at the trainee level and move up the ranks based on the prison's routinised ability examinations which assess inmates’ effort and attitude levels, and the quality and quantity of produced goods. Prisoners who are involved in work programs external to the prison or those who work outside of the typical labour schedule receive increased compensation. This is also the case for inmates who perform ‘dangerous labour.’

The money earned by inmates through prison labour in Japan is not ‘owned’ by the inmate until they are released from incarceration. Instead, income is placed into a specialised bank account with only a small amount being available for prisoner use to purchase essential items from the prison store. Permission may also be granted for inmates to use this saved amount toward fines, lawsuit fees and alimony.

Depending on an inmate's classification, occupational training is also a feature of Japan's correctional system. Intended to prepare prisoners for their release into society, prison institutions may offer training in dry cleaning, automobile repairs, photo typography, carpentry and leatherwork. These opportunities are based on prisoner requests and may or may not be accepted by prison authorities. Prisoners in Japan are also able to undertake factory work (i.e. assembling machinery, fabricating parts) for external manufacturers through contracted arrangements. As opposed to outsourcing labour to China-based factories, manufacturers subcontract their factory work to prisons to save shipping and production costs.

== Institution types ==
=== Private prisons ===
A large part of paid prison labour is controlled by private prisons designed as for-profit organisations that manage correctional facilities on both the state and federal levels. These prisons are organised contractually to oversee pre-existing public facilities or through managing private facilities independently. The privatisation of prisons became increasingly popular in the 21st century. In most cases, Governments contract companies to build and manage prison facilities to pay the company per prisoner/per day.

Wages are characteristically lower than minimum wage in private prisons, with some inmates earning less than US$1 per hour for their work. Portions of prisoner wages may also be withheld by the state to compensate for incarceration costs. Regulations in private prisons are minimal, limiting inmate access to sick leave and holidays, while also potentially endangering workers due to the lack of federal oversight in the area of workplace safety. In various private prisons, inmates who refuse to perform their allocated work may be a subject to a loss of privileges as punishment.

In the United States, about 10% of prisoners are held in private prisons or facilities which are independently contracted by the federal and state governments. A considerable 75% these private prisons operate under the authority of two corporations: the Corrections Corporation of America (CCA) and the GEO Group. Alongside the increase of prisoners in privatised prisons, CCA and GEO Group experienced associated profit growth with their annual revenues surpassing US$2.9 billion in 2010.

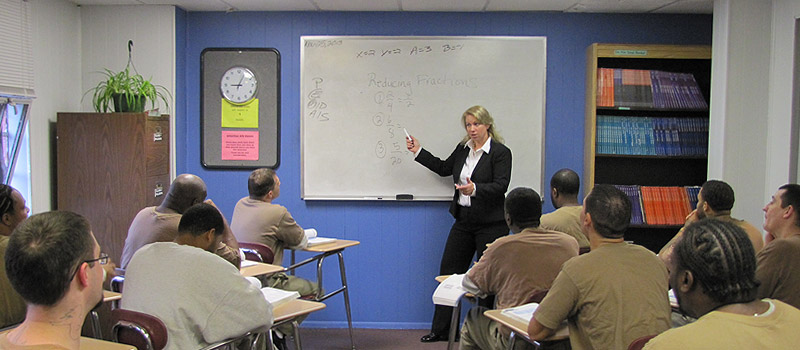
Education programs available alongside paid work in minimum-security facilities

U.S. inmates incarcerated in private facilities are given the opportunity for paid work in association with companies such as Revlon, Target and Microsoft. American Corporations who employ prison labourers may benefit by using the tag ‘made in the USA’ and reduced transportation fees accumulated through shipping externally manufactured products back to the US to package and sell.

=== Minimum, medium, and high security ===
Paid prison labour is experienced differently based on the security type of prison facilities – whether this is minimum, medium, or maximum security.

Reserved for low-risk or non-violent offenders, minimum-security prisons are of a similar layout to college campuses, where inmates are entitled to greater privileges (e.g. freedom to roam the prison grounds) and there is high participation in paid labour. Inmates incarcerated in minimum-security prisoners are those with cleaner criminal records (thieves, frauds etc.) or inmates who have already served the majority of their sentence in a different facility with sustained good behaviour. In most countries, minimum-security facilities incorporate dormitory-style living quarters and fewer guards than higher security prisons.

Medium-security prisons are the most common type of facility and typically house the majority of criminals. These facilities are surrounded by razor-wire fences and feature cage-style housing and increased guard activity. Inmates in medium-security prisons experience a more regimented routine that those incarcerated in minimum-security prisons. Paid work is less prominent as Regulations limit the types of paid work available, for instance, removing the opportunity for inmates to seek external employment or training.

Maximum-security prisons incarcerate the most high-risk and dangerous offenders. Prisoners in these facilities are overseen by numerous guards and experience minimal freedoms and privileges. This includes paid work, with most high-security inmates having no option to participate in paid employment while serving their sentence. Maximum-security prisons are surrounded by high walls, barbed tape and armed guards posted in Observation towers. Total lockdowns are routine in maximum-security prisons, occurring when incidents take place and prisoners are confined to their private cells for several days. Some maximum-security prisons – known as Supermax prisons – operate under permanent lockdown, although most prisons feature a Supermax ward known as a ‘security housing unit.’ Prisoners refer to this facility as ‘the hole.'
