= Beach furniture =

Furniture used on a beach

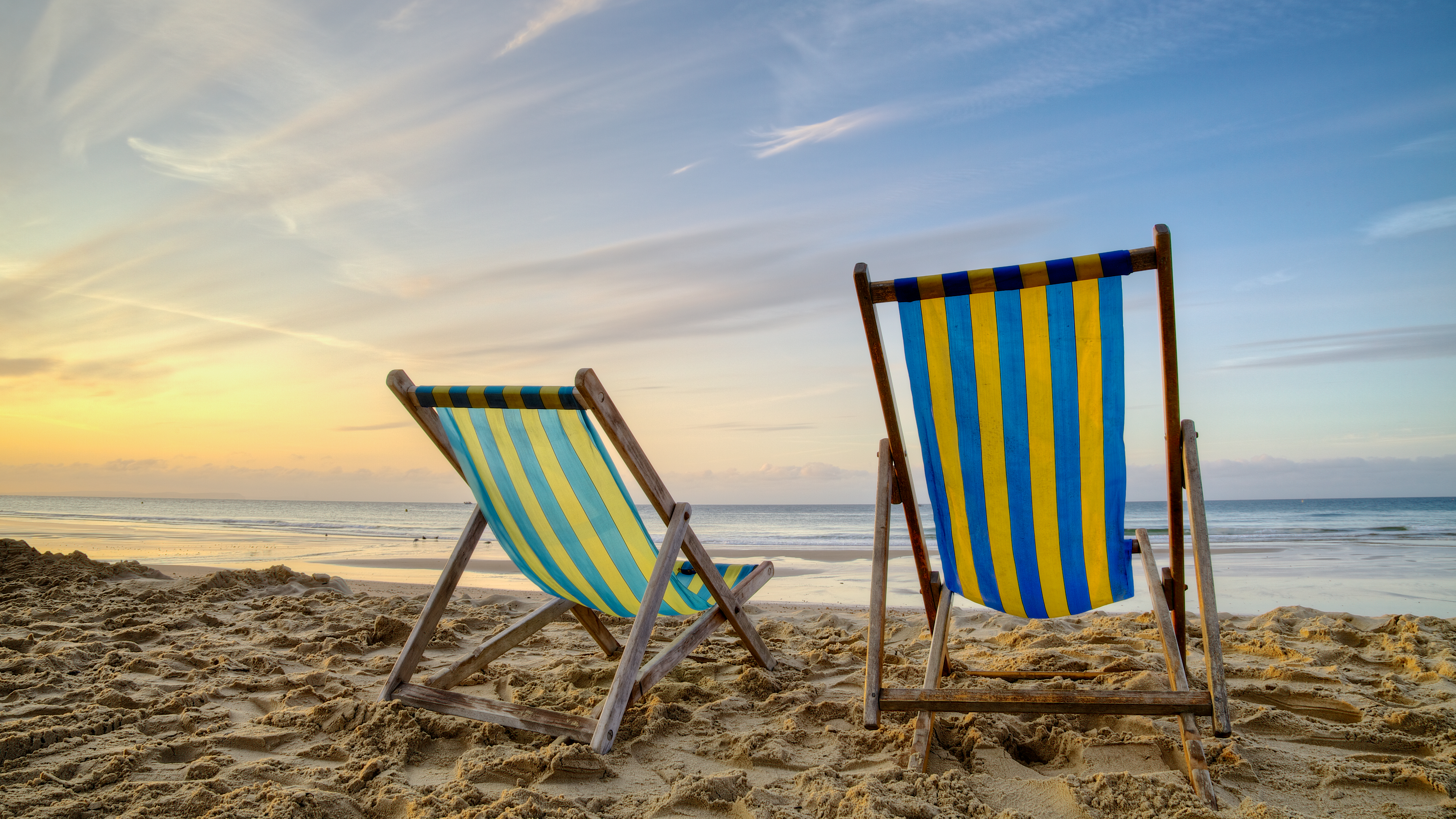
Beach chairs

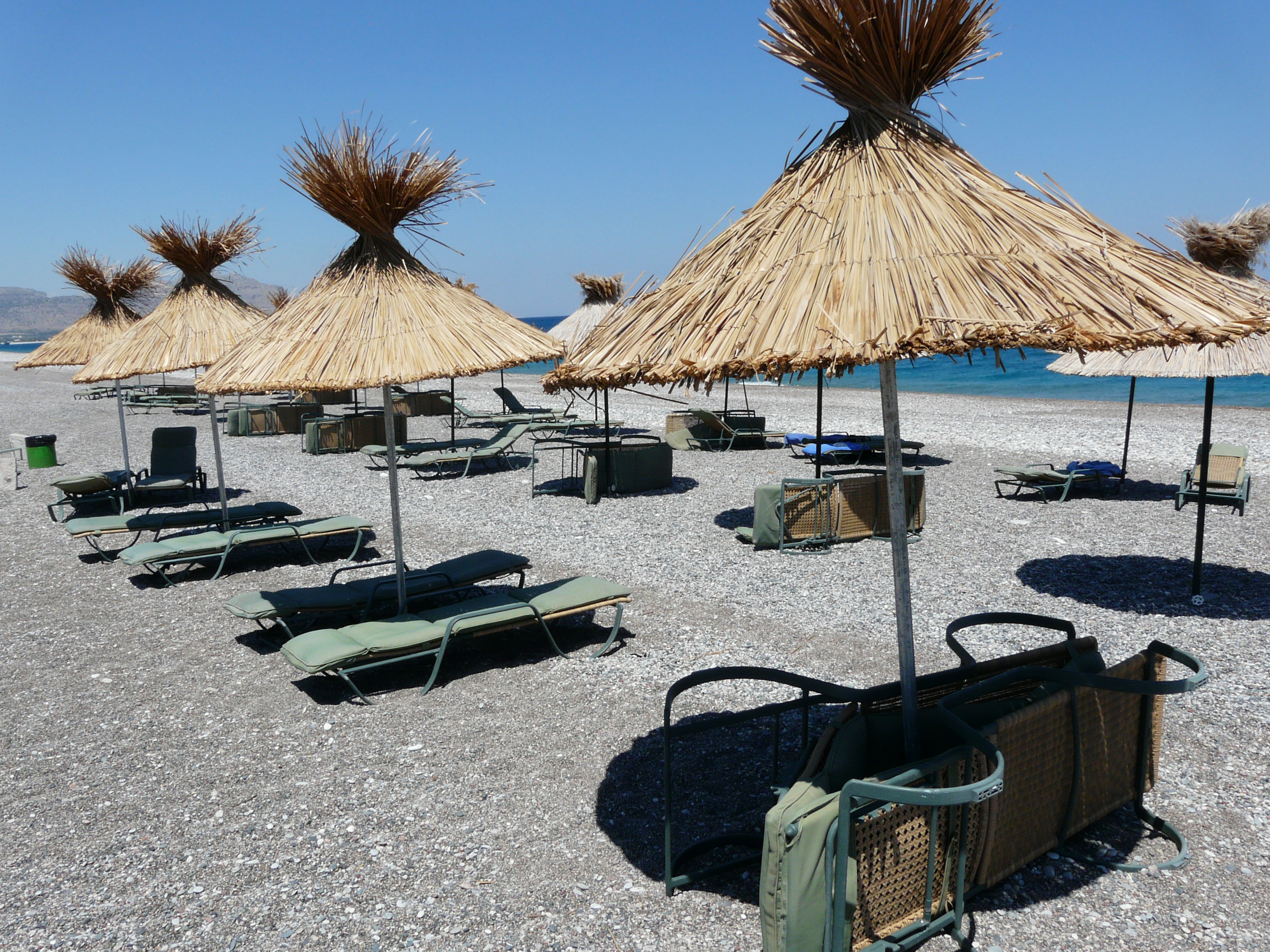
Beach furniture and umbrellas

Beach furniture is furniture designed for use with or in an urban beach or natural beach.

== Standard beach furniture ==
Typically beach furniture is made of plastic, concrete, or of stainless steel.

For example, the Sankofa Square beach area includes a number of stainless steel chairs that are placed on the beach area during the day and stored at night (even though the urbeach, including the aquatic play features, remain open 24 hours a day).

== Installation art beach furniture ==
The Teluscape beach at the Ontario Science Centre incorporates beach furniture into the design of the water-pipe-organ (hydraulophone). The South Division of the pipe organ's pipes are incorporated/incorporating seating made of cast-in-place concrete. In this beach, the area was excavated and an underground sounding chamber was constructed for the pipe organ, wherein part of the sounding chamber extends out as a hollow snakelike "creature" upon which the "head" of the snake forms a seating surface all the way around the largest pipes of the organ, and the "tail" of the snake provides partial seating on the side of the organ pipes that face the playing surface (fountain jets).
